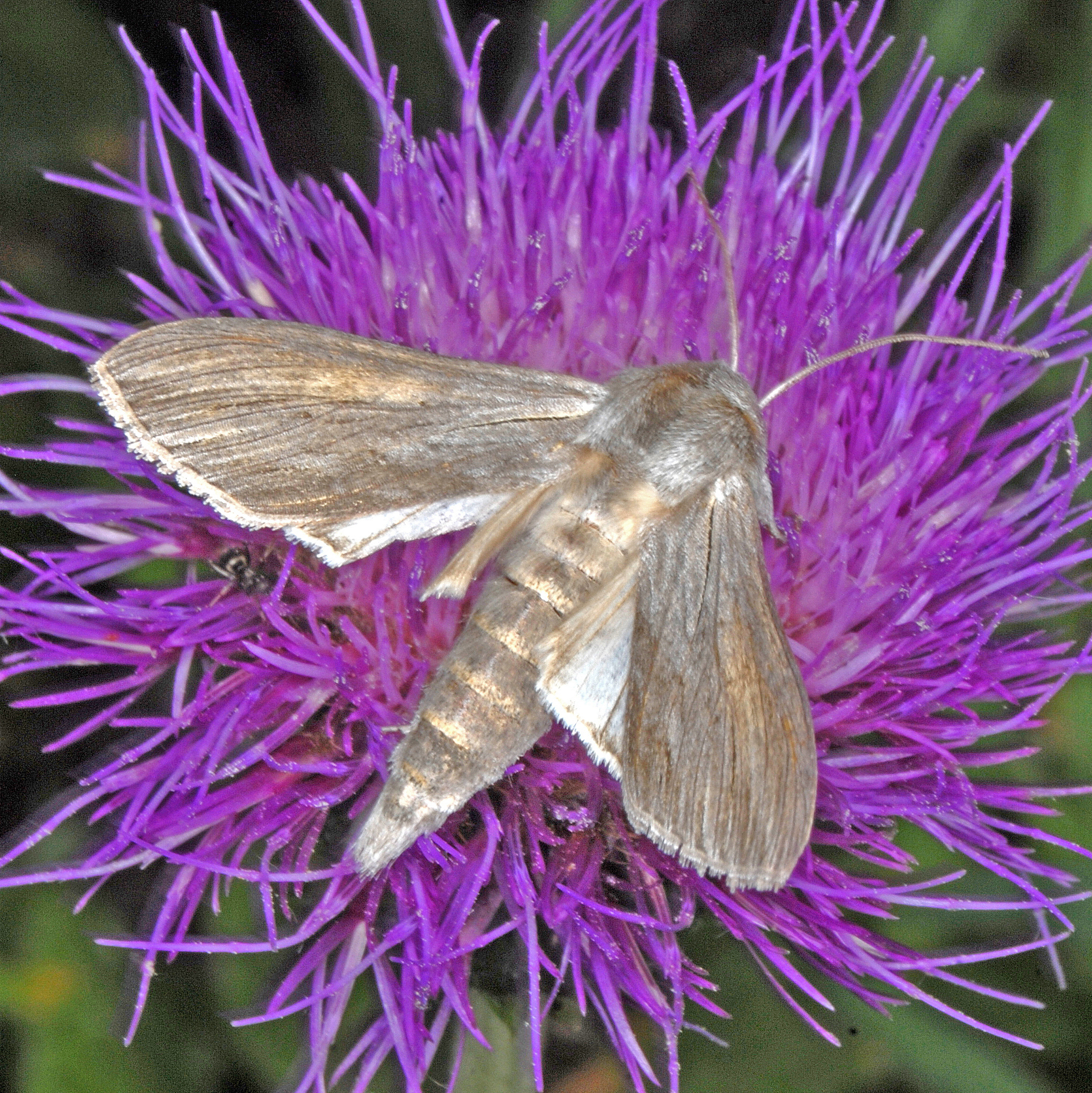
- Cucullia umbratica

Scientific classification
- Domain: Eukaryota
- Kingdom: Animalia
- Phylum: Arthropoda
- Class: Insecta
- Order: Lepidoptera
- Superfamily: Noctuoidea
- Family: Noctuidae
- Subfamily: Cuculliinae
- Genus: Cucullia; Schrank, 1802

Synonyms
- Tribonophora Hübner, [1806]; Tribonophorae Ochsenheimer, 1816; Argyritis Hübner, [1821]; Callaenia Hübner, [1821]; Empusa Hübner, [1821]; Eucalimia Hübner, [1821]; Euderaea Hübner, [1821]; Tribunophora Hübner, 1822; Lophia Sodoffsky, 1837; Lathosea Grote, 1881; Nycterophaeta Smith, 1882; Epinyctis Grote, 1882; Rancora Smith, 1892; Copicucullia Smith, 1894; Dasysternum Staudinger, 1895; Argyrogalea Hampson, 1906; Argyromata Hampson, 1906; Cheligalea Hampson, 1906; Empusada Hampson, 1906; Pseudocopicucullia Dumont, 1928; Metlaouia Dumont, 1928; Pseudonycterophaeta Berio, 1934

= Cucullia =

Genus of moths

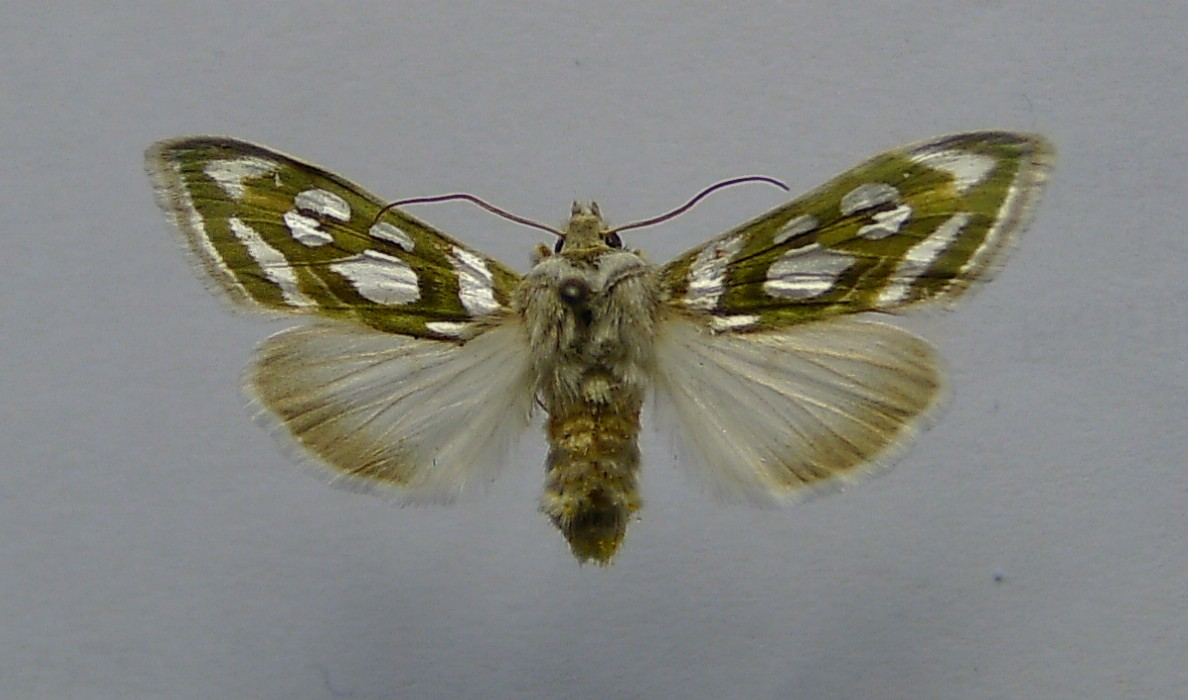
Cucullia argentea

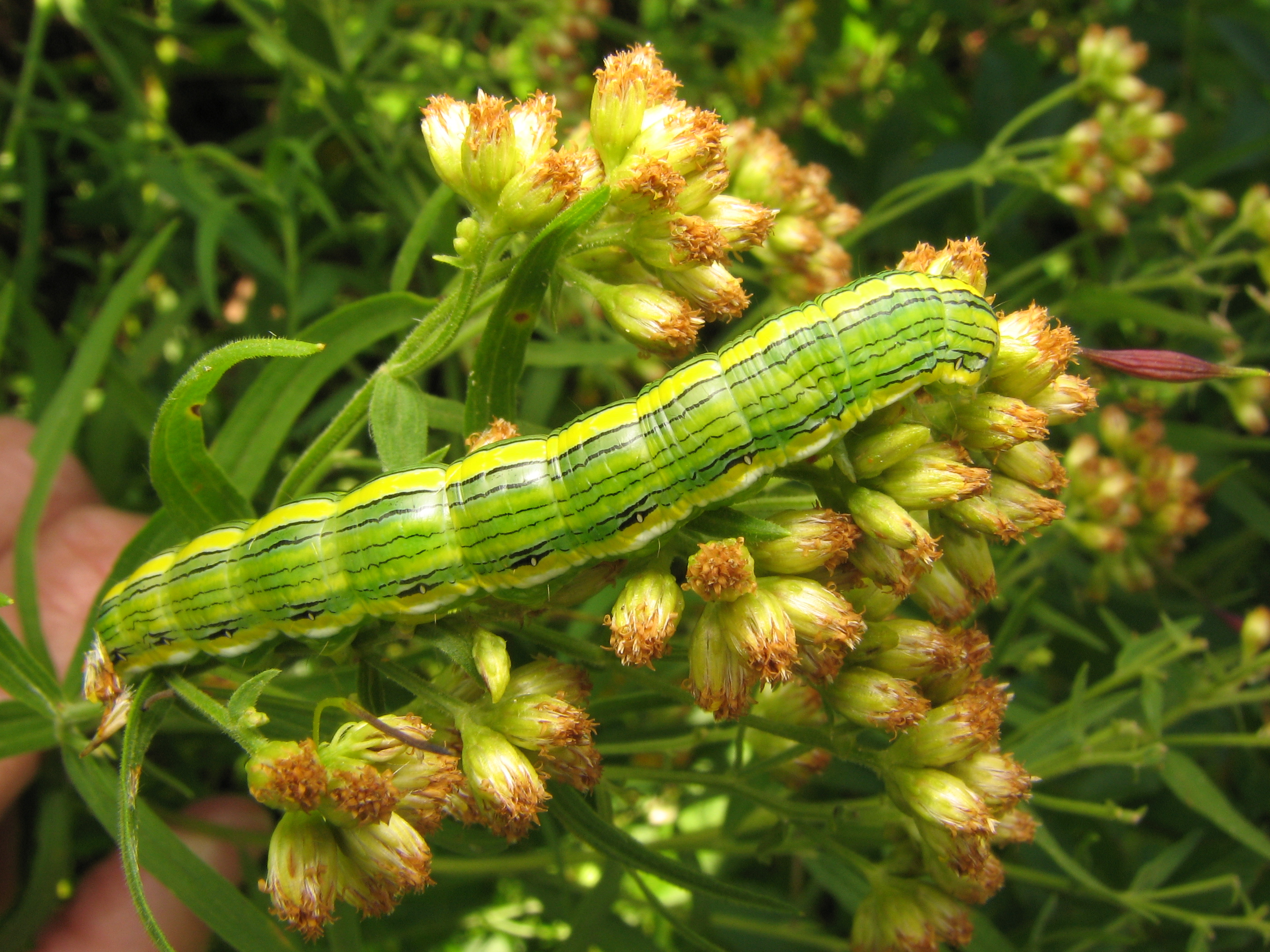
Cucullia asteroides caterpillar

Cucullia is a genus of moths of the family Noctuidae. The genus was erected by Franz von Paula Schrank in 1802.

== Species ==
- Cucullia absinthii Linnaeus, 1761
- Cucullia achilleae Guenée, 1852
- Cucullia aksuana Draudt, 1935
- Cucullia albida Smith, 1894
- Cucullia albilineata Gaede, 1934
- Cucullia albipennis Hampson, 1894
- Cucullia alfarata Strecker, 1898
- Cucullia amota Alphéraky, 1887
- Cucullia anthocharis Boursin, 1969
- Cucullia antipoda Strecker, 1877
- Cucullia aplana Viette, 1958
- Cucullia apo Ronkay, Varga & Hreblay, 1998
- Cucullia argentea Hufnagel, 1766
- Cucullia argentilinea (Gaede, 1934)
- Cucullia argentina Fabricius, 1787
- Cucullia argentivitta (Hampson, 1906)
- Cucullia artemisiae Hufnagel, 1766
- Cucullia asteris Denis & Schiffermüller, 1775 - star-wort
- Cucullia asteroides Guenée, 1852
- Cucullia astigma Smith, 1894
- Cucullia balsamitae Boisduval, 1840
- Cucullia basipuncta Barnes & McDunnough, 1918
- Cucullia behouneki Hacker & Ronkay, 1988
- Cucullia bensi Agenjo, 1952
- Cucullia biornata Fischer von Waldheim, 1840
- Cucullia biradiata Kozhanchikov, 1925
- Cucullia biskrana Oberthür, 1918
- Cucullia boryphora Fischer von Waldheim, 1840
- Cucullia bubaceki Kitt, 1925
- Cucullia calendulae Treitschke, 1835
- Cucullia campanulae Freyer, 1831
- Cucullia capazi Agenjo, 1952
- Cucullia cemenelensis Boursin, 1923
- Cucullia chamomillae Denis & Schiffermüller, 1775 - chamomille shark
- Cucullia charon Poole, 1995
- Cucullia chrysota Hampson, 1902
- Cucullia cineracea Freyer, 1841
- Cucullia citella Ronkay & Ronkay, 1988
- Cucullia comstocki (McDunnough, 1937)
- Cucullia convexipennis Grote & Robinson, 1868
- Cucullia cucullioides Barnes & Benjamin, 1923
- Cucullia dallolmoi Berio, 1973
- Cucullia dammersi (McDunnough, 1935)
- Cucullia dimorpha Staudinger, 1896
- Cucullia dorsalis Smith, 1892
- Cucullia dracunculi Hübner, 1813
- Cucullia draudti Boursin, 1942
- Cucullia duplicata Staudinger, 1882
- Cucullia eccissica Dyar, 1919
- Cucullia elongata Butler, 1880
- Cucullia embolina Püngeler, 1906
- Cucullia ennatae (Laporte, 1984)
- Cucullia eucaena Dyar, 1919
- Cucullia eulepis Grote, 1876
- Cucullia eumorpha Alphéraky, 1893
- Cucullia eurekae Poole, 1995
- Cucullia florea Guenée, 1852
- Cucullia formosa Rogenhofer, 1860
- Cucullia fraterna Butler, 1878
- Cucullia fraudatrix Eversmann, 1837
- Cucullia fuchsiana Eversmann, 1837
- Cucullia galleti Rungs, 1972
- Cucullia generosa Staudinger, 1889
- Cucullia gnaphalii Hübner, 1813
- Cucullia graeseri Püngeler, 1901
- Cucullia gricescens Leech, 1900
- Cucullia hannemanni Varga, 1976
- Cucullia hartigi Ronkay & Ronkay, 1988
- Cucullia heinickei Boursin, 1968
- Cucullia heinrichi Barnes & Benjamin, 1924
- Cucullia hemidiaphana Graeser, 1892
- Cucullia hostilis Boursin, 1934
- Cucullia humilis Boursin, 1942
- Cucullia hutchinsoni Hampson, 1902
- Cucullia ikondae Berio, 1973
- Cucullia implicata Ronkay & Ronkay, 1987
- Cucullia improba Christoph, 1885
- Cucullia incresa Smith, 1910
- Cucullia inderiensis Herrich-Schäffer, 1855
- Cucullia infernalis Boursin, 1942
- Cucullia intermedia Speyer, 1870
- Cucullia jakesi Ronkay & Ronkay, 1988
- Cucullia jankowskii Oberthür, 1884
- Cucullia khorassana Brandt, 1941
- Cucullia kurilullia Bryk, 1942
- Cucullia lactea Fabricius, 1787
- Cucullia lactucae Denis & Schiffermüller, 1775
- Cucullia laetifica Lintner, 1875
- Cucullia ledereri Staudinger, 1892
- Cucullia lethe Poole, 1995
- Cucullia lilacina Schaus, 1898
- Cucullia lindei Heyne, 1899
- Cucullia lucifuga Denis & Schiffermüller, 1775
- Cucullia luna Morrison, 1875
- Cucullia macara Rebel, 1947
- Cucullia maculosa Staudinger, 1888
- Cucullia magdalenae (Laporte, 1976)
- Cucullia magnifica Freyer, 1839
- Cucullia malagassa Viette, 1958
- Cucullia mandschruriae Oberthür, 1884
- Cucullia maracandica Staudinger, 1888
- Cucullia marci Ronkay & Ronkay, 1988
- Cucullia marmorea Boursin, 1942
- Cucullia mcdunnoughi Henne, 1940
- Cucullia melanoglossa Berio, 1934
- Cucullia melli Boursin, 1942
- Cucullia minuta Möschler, 1884
- Cucullia mixta Freyer, 1841
- Cucullia montanae Grote, 1882
- Cucullia naruenensis Staudinger, 1879
- Cucullia nigrifascia Hampson, 1894
- Cucullia nokra Rungs, 1952
- Cucullia omissa Dod, 1916
- Cucullia opacographa Ronkay & Ronkay, 1986
- Cucullia oribac Barnes, 1904
- Cucullia pallidistria Felder & Rogenhofer, 1874
- Cucullia papoka Ronkay & Ronkay, 1986
- Cucullia perforata Bremer, 1864
- Cucullia petrophila Ronkay, Varga & Hreblay, 1998
- Cucullia phocylides Druce, 1889
- Cucullia pittawayi Wiltshire, 1987
- Cucullia platinea Ronaky & Ronkay, 1987
- Cucullia postera Guenée, 1852
- Cucullia praecana Eversmann, 1844
- Cucullia prolai Berio, 1956
- Cucullia propinqua Eversmann, 1842
- Cucullia pseudumbratica Boursin, 1942
- Cucullia pulla (Grote, 1881)
- Cucullia pullata Moore, 1881
- Cucullia pusilla Möschler, 1884
- Cucullia pyrostrota Hampson, 1906
- Cucullia retecta Püngeler, 1901
- Cucullia retectina Ronkay & Ronkay, 1987
- Cucullia ruficeps Hampson, 1906
- Cucullia sabulosa Staudinger, 1879
- Cucullia santolinae Rambur, 1834
- Cucullia santonici Hübner, [1813]
- Cucullia scopariae Dorfmeister, 1853
- Cucullia scoparioides Boursin, 1942
- Cucullia serraticornis Lintner, 1874
- Cucullia similaris J. B. Smith, 1892
- Cucullia simoneuai Laporte, 1976
- Cucullia spectabilisoides Poole, 1989
- Cucullia speyeri Lintner, 1874
- Cucullia splendida Stoll, 1782
- Cucullia strigata (Smith, 1892)
- Cucullia styx Poole, 1995
- Cucullia subgrisea Ronkay & Ronkay, 1986
- Cucullia sublutea Graeser, 1892
- Cucullia syrtana Mabille, 1888
- Cucullia tanaceti Denis & Schiffermüller, 1775
- Cucullia tecca Püngeler, 1906
- Cucullia tedjicolora Laporte, 1977
- Cucullia tescorum Püngeler, 1909
- Cucullia tiefi Tshetverikov, 1956
- Cucullia tosca Bang-Haas, 1912
- Cucullia tristis Boursin, 1934
- Cucullia turkestana Ronkay & Ronkay, 1987
- Cucullia umbistriga Alphéraky, 1892
- Cucullia umbratica Linnaeus, 1758 - shark
- Cucullia verbasci (Linnaeus, 1758) - mullein moth
- Cucullia vicina Bang-Haas, 1912
- Cucullia virgaureae Boisduval, 1840
- Cucullia xeranthemi Boisduval, 1840
- Cucullia xerophila Ronkay, Varga & Hreblay, 1998

== Former species ==
- Cucullia dentilinea is now Dolocucullia dentilinea (Smith, 1899)
- Cucullia minor is now Dolocucullia minor (Barnes & McDunnough, 1913)
- Cucullia obtusa is now Supralathosea obtusa J. B. Smith, 1909

== Cucullia gallery ==
=== Imagines ===
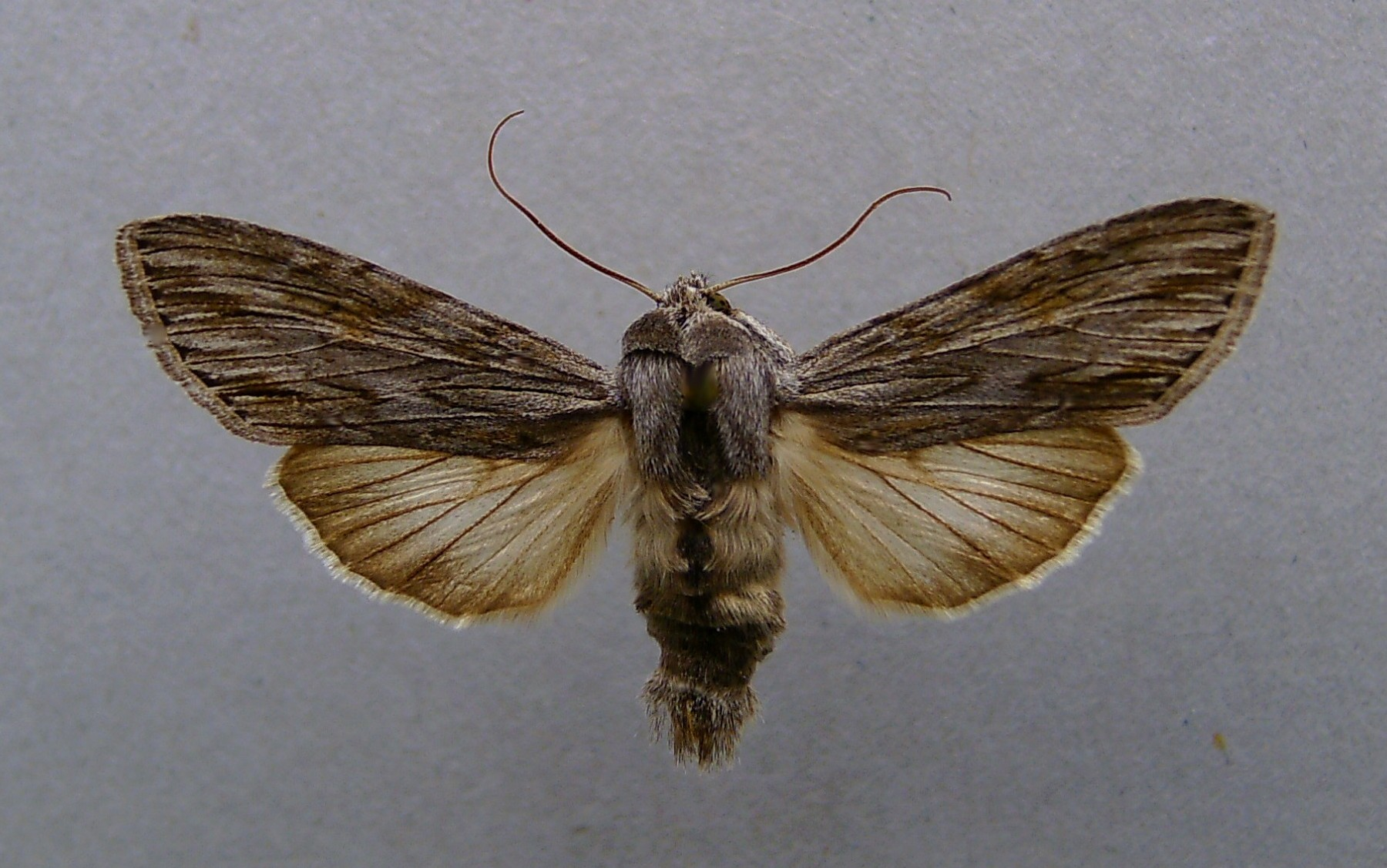
Cucullia lucifuga

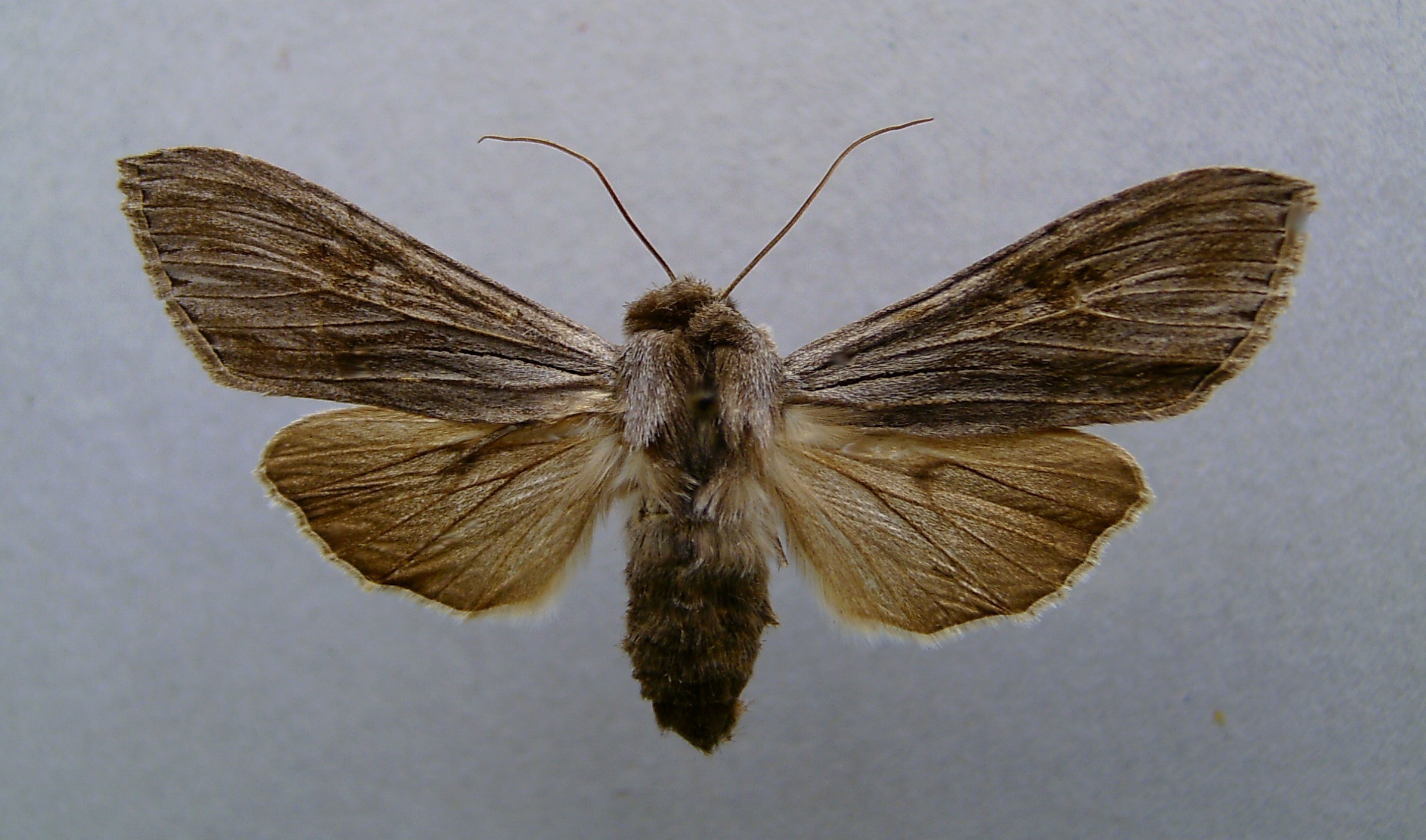
Cucullia lactucae

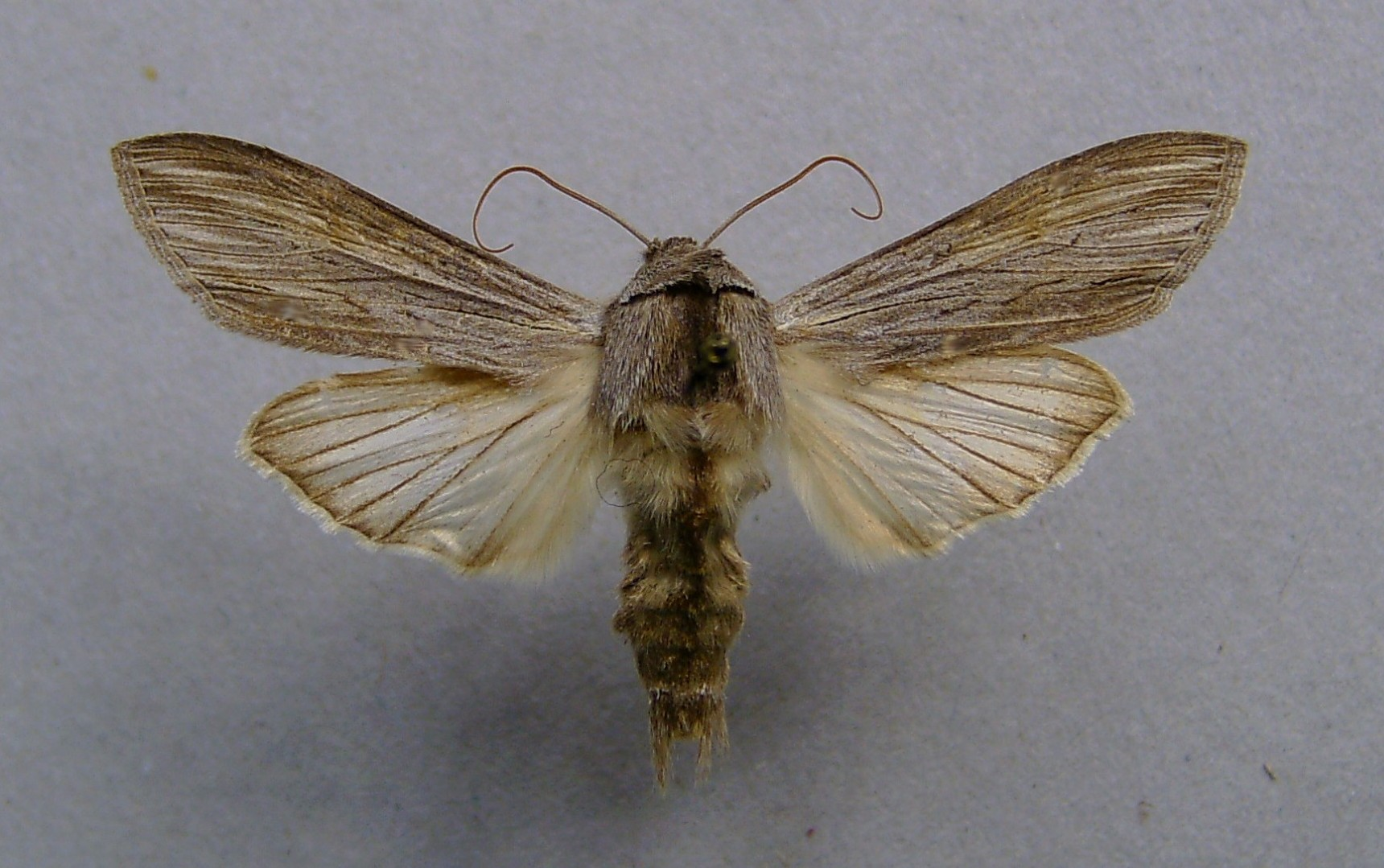
Cucullia umbratica

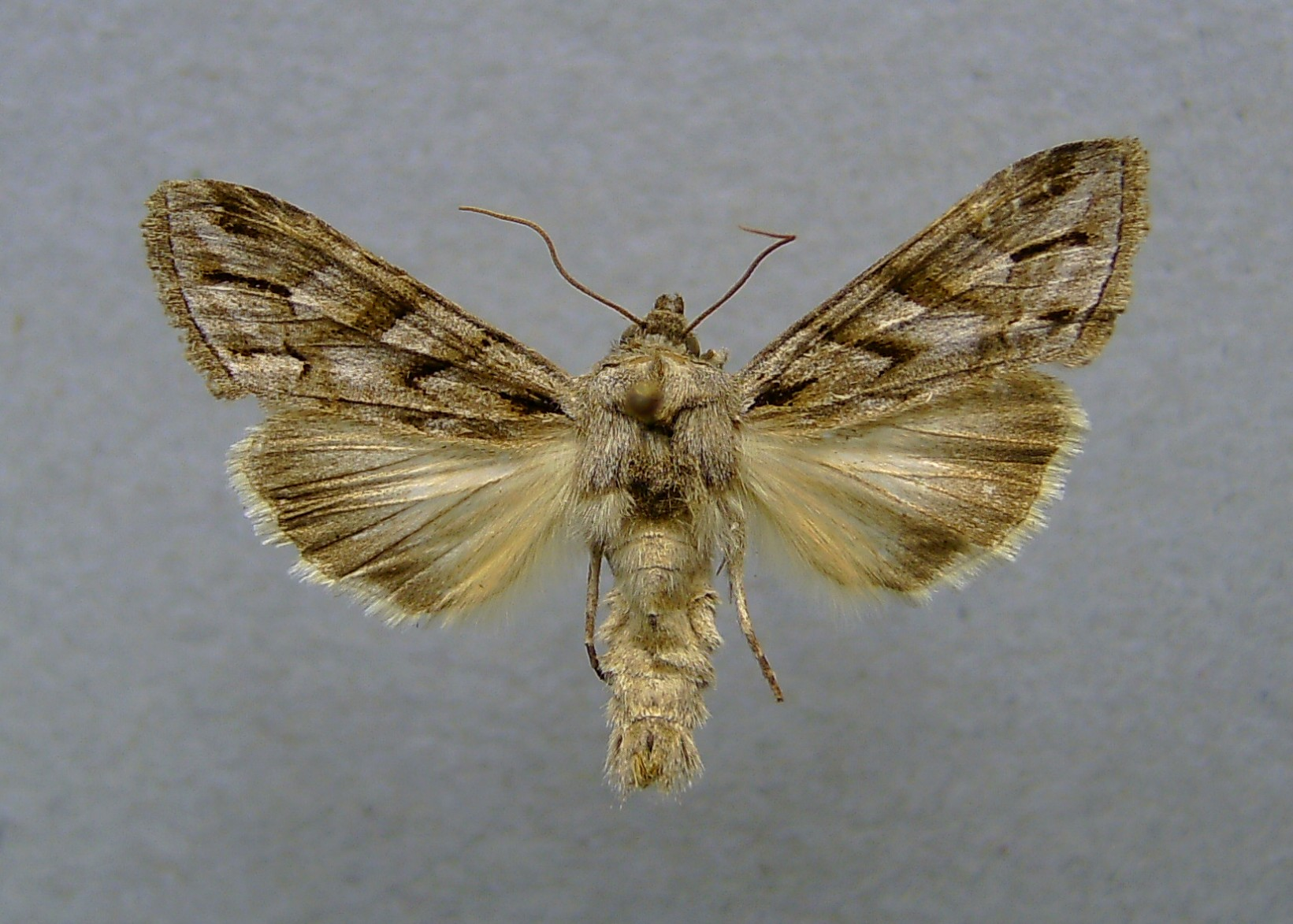
Cucullia fraudatrix

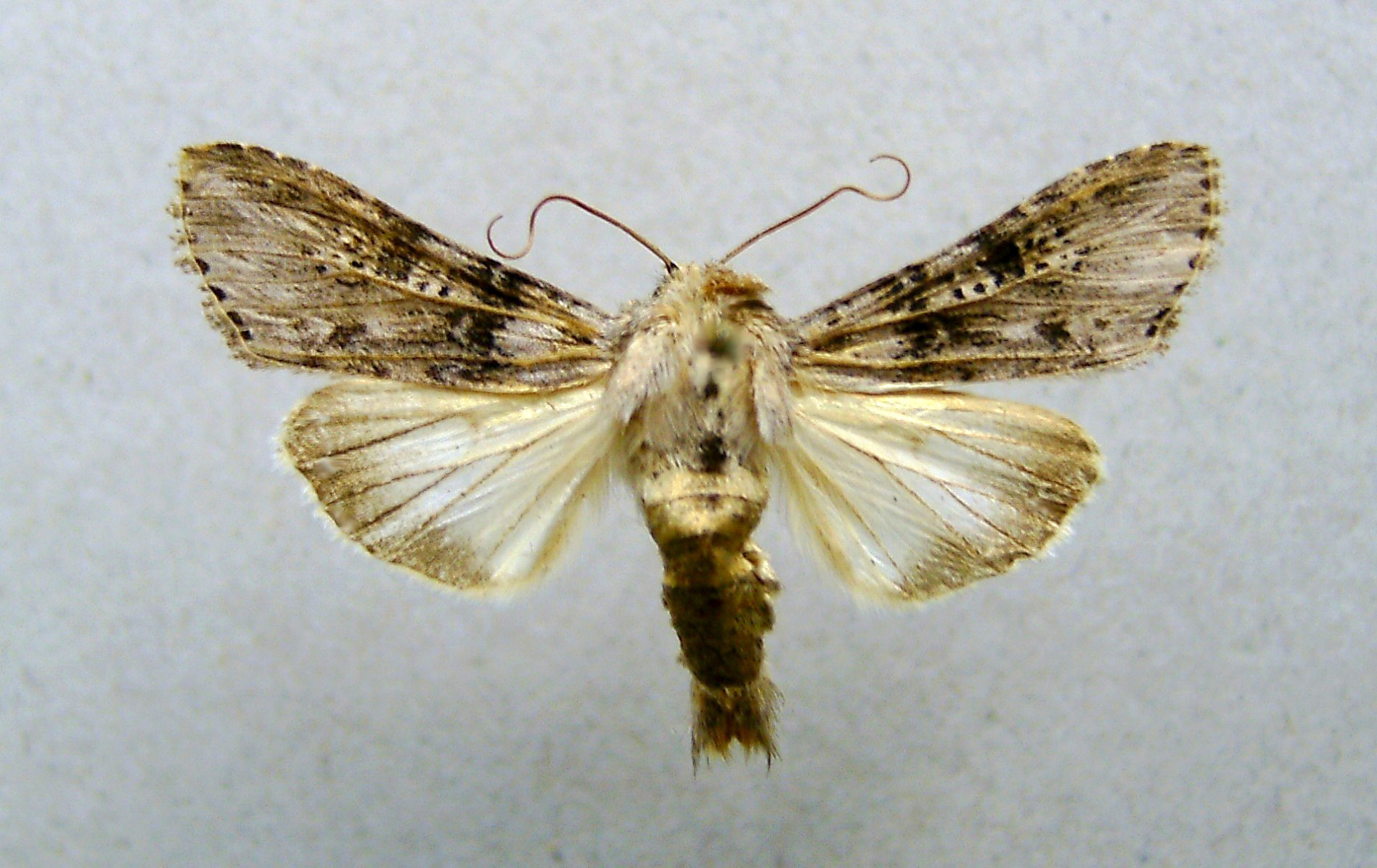
Cucullia absinthii

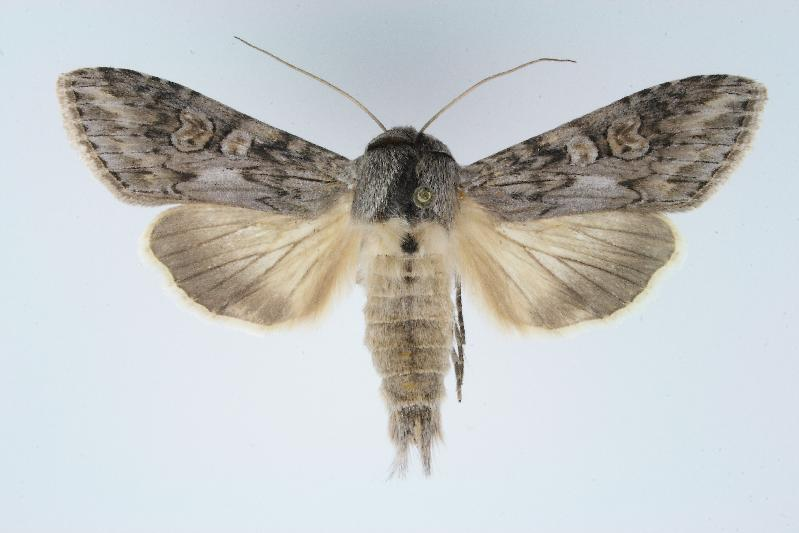
Cucullia artemisiae

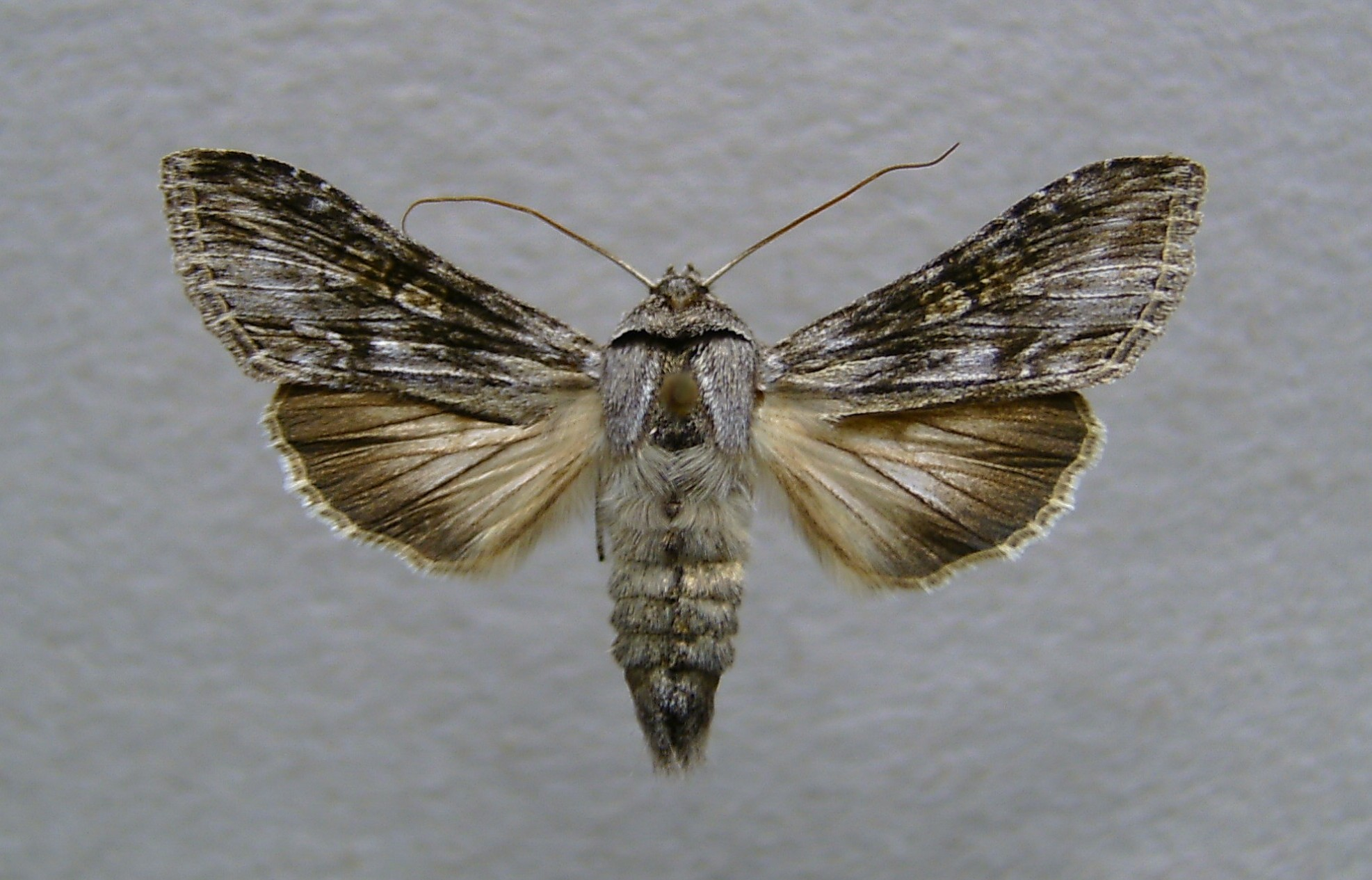
Cucullia xeranthemi

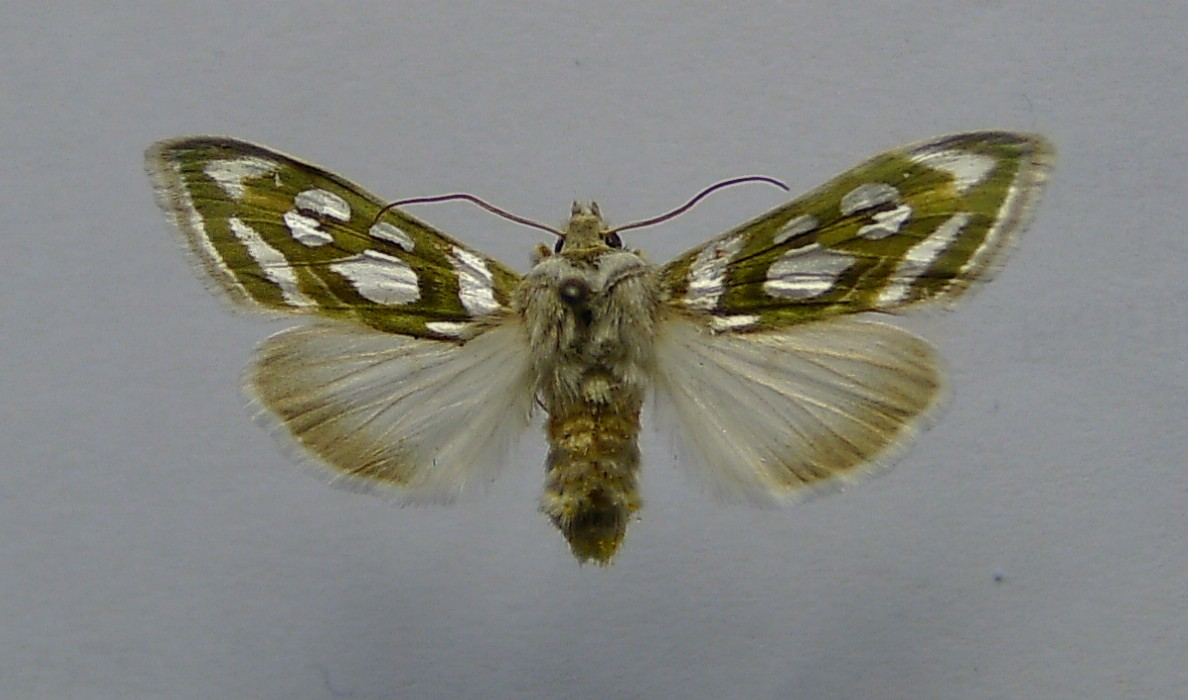
Cucullia argentea

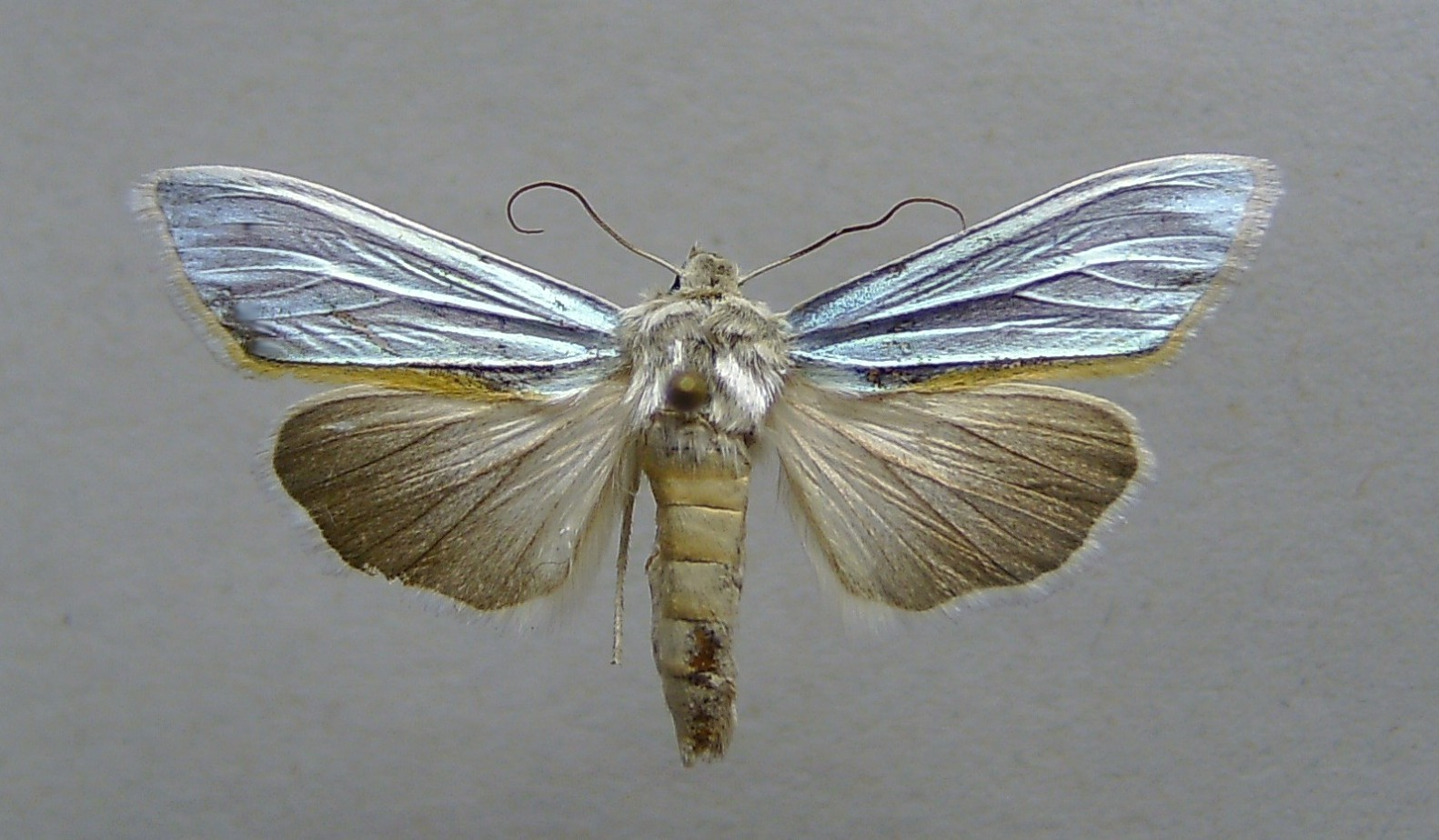
Cucullia splendida

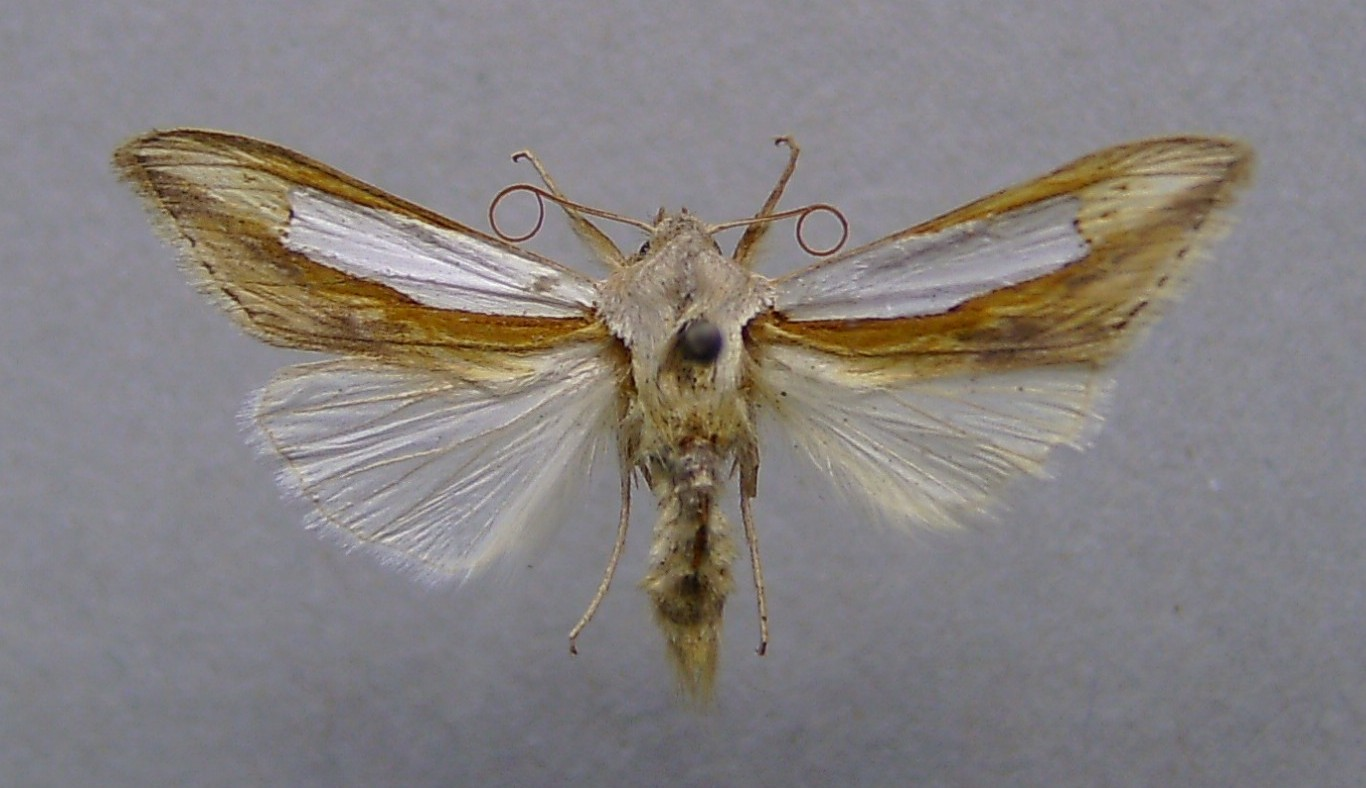
Cucullia argentina

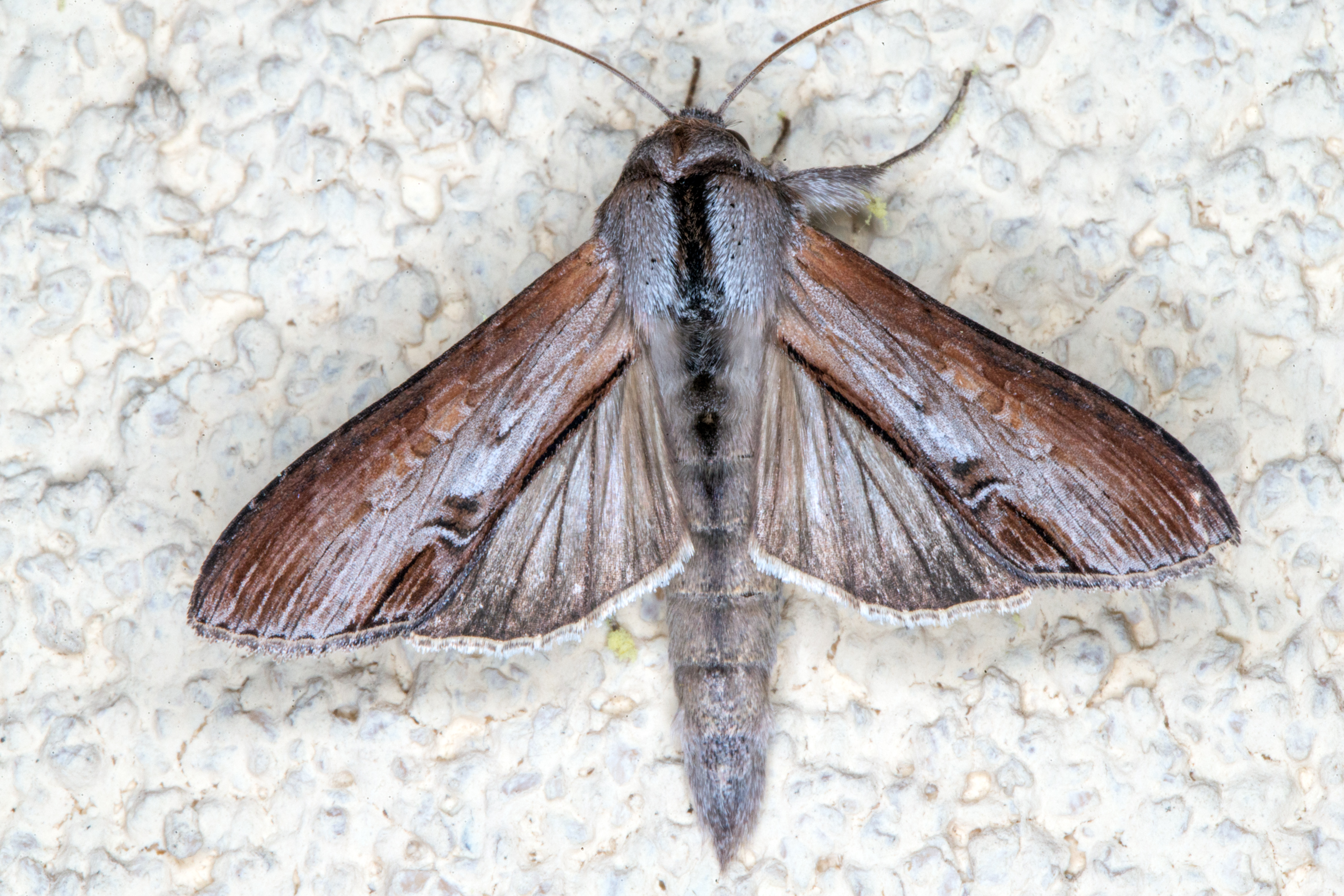
Cucullia asteris

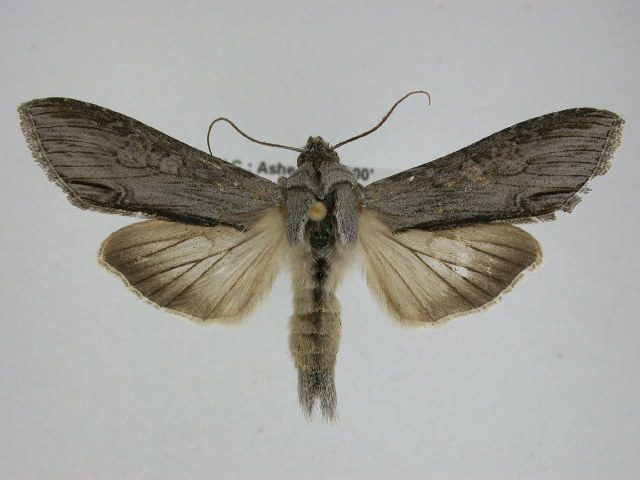
Cucullia postera

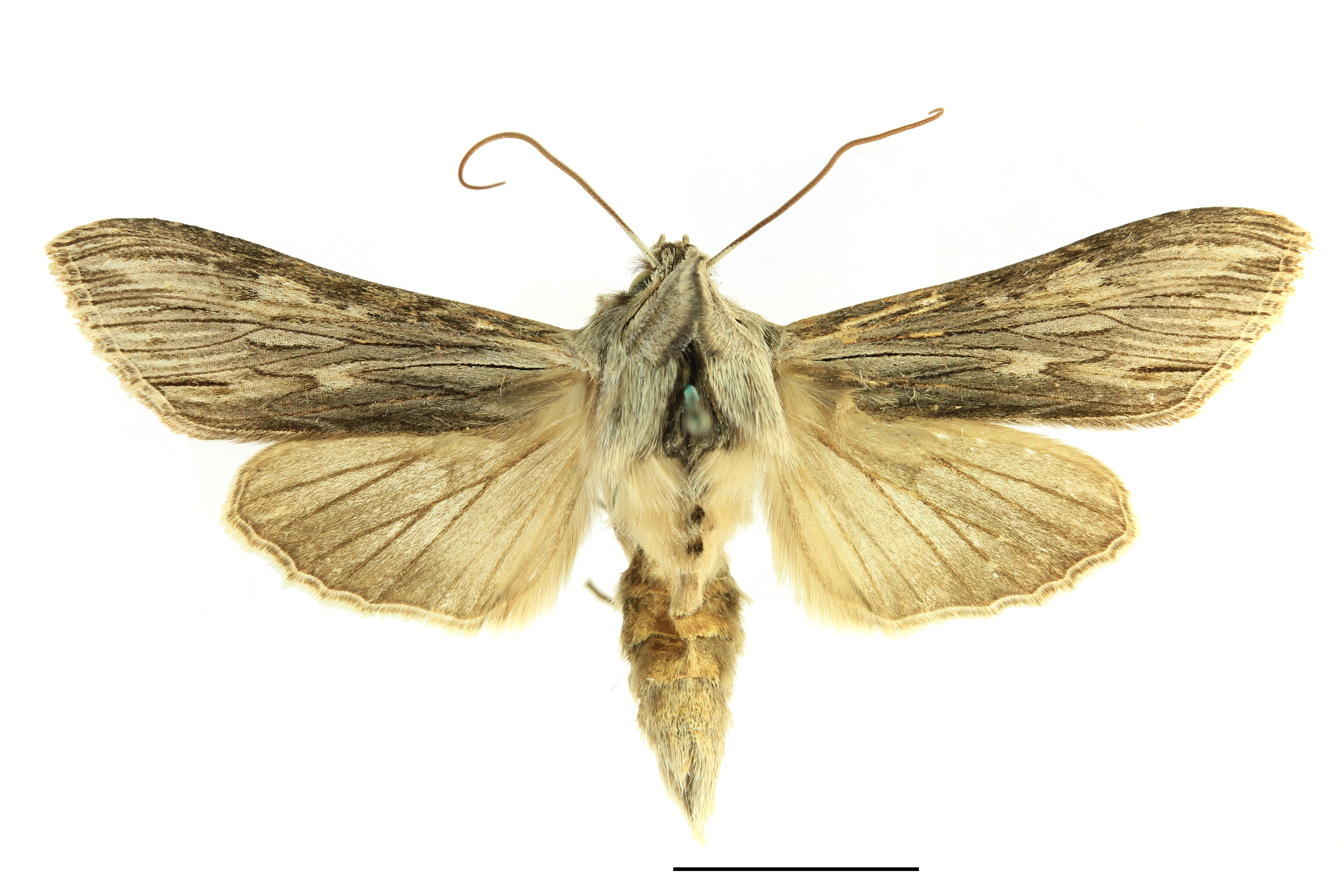
Cucullia chamomillae

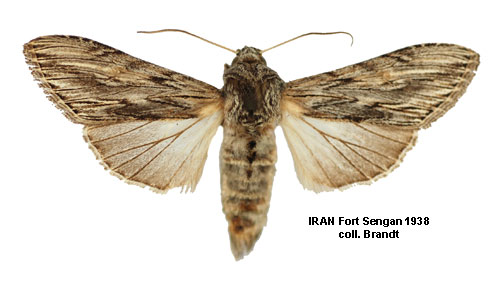
Cucullia boryphora

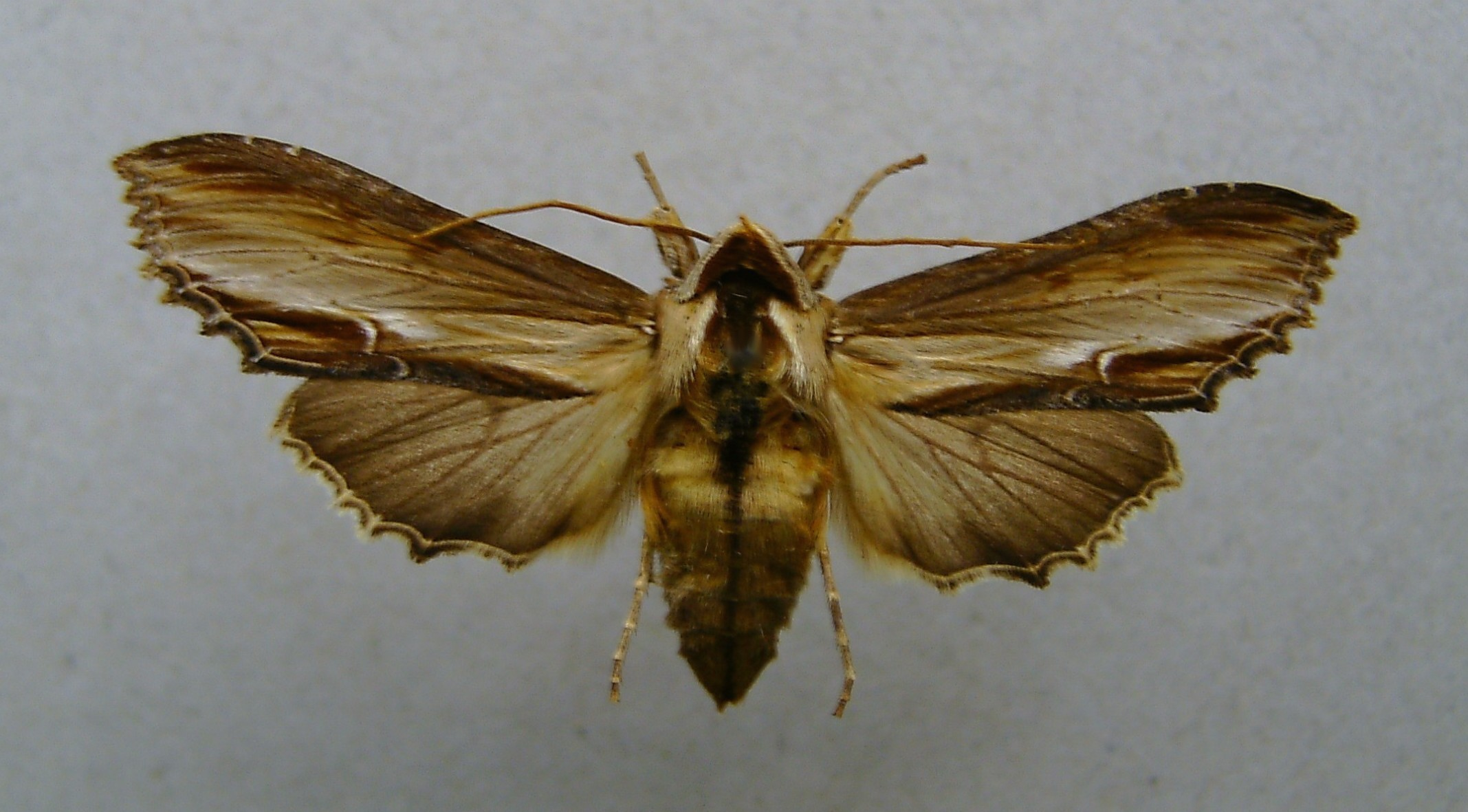
Cucullia verbasci

=== Larvae ===
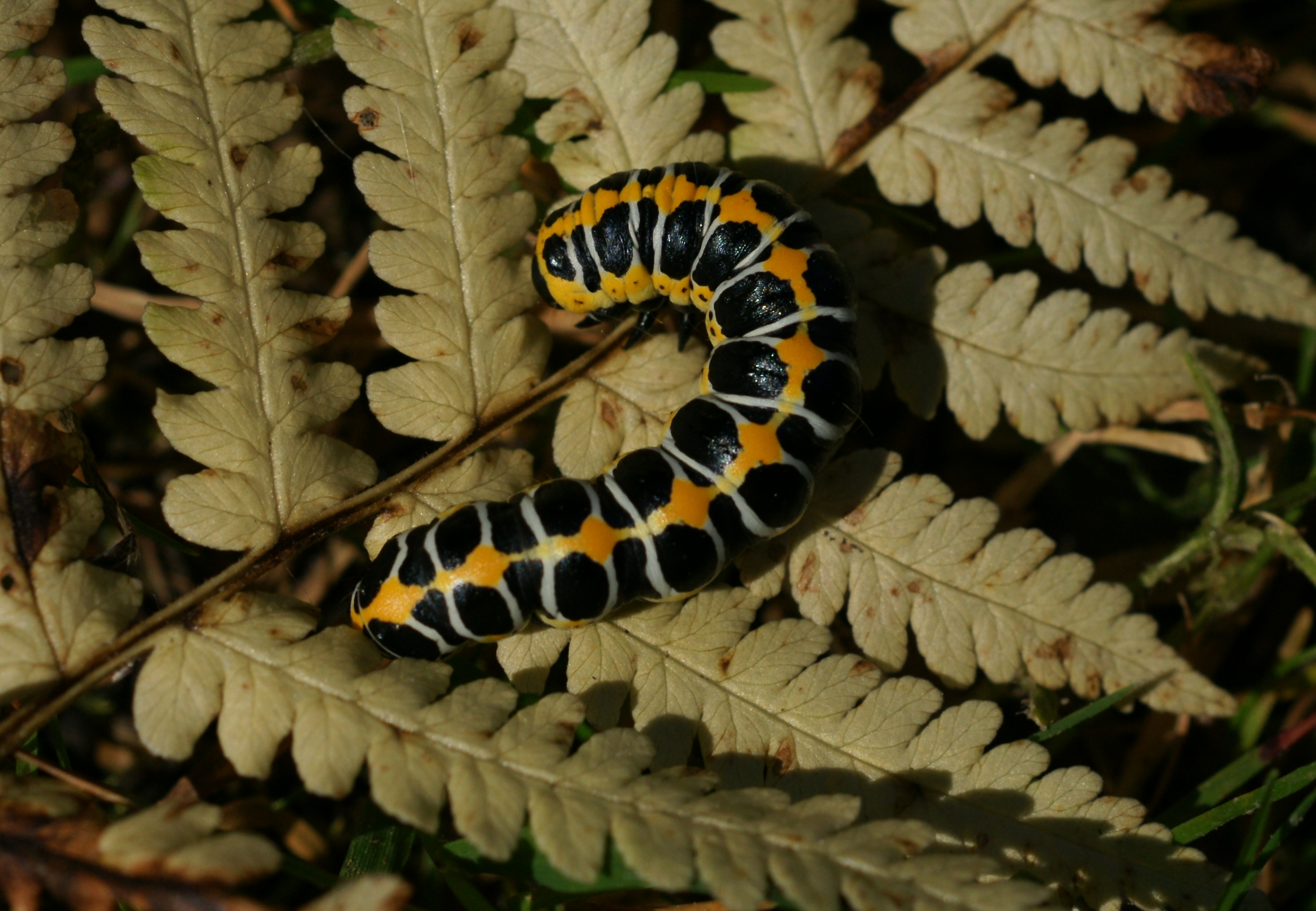
Cucullia lactucae

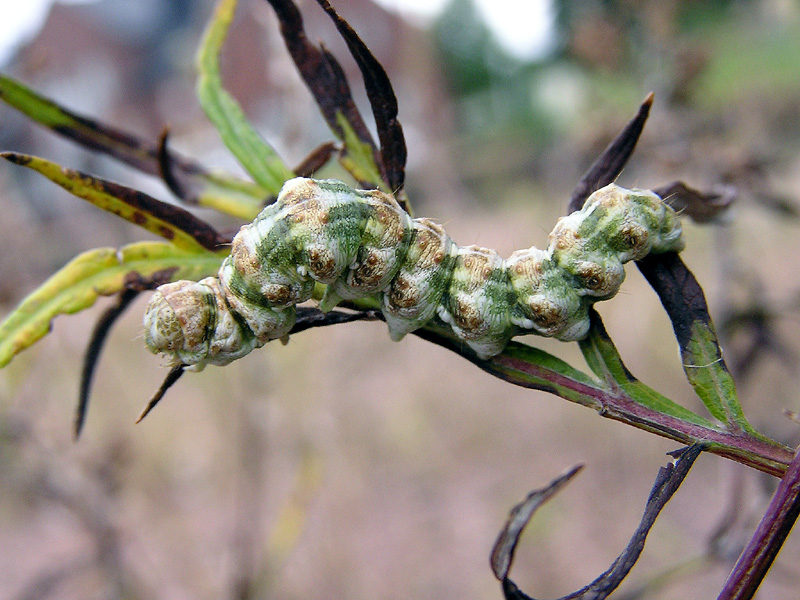
Cucullia absinthii

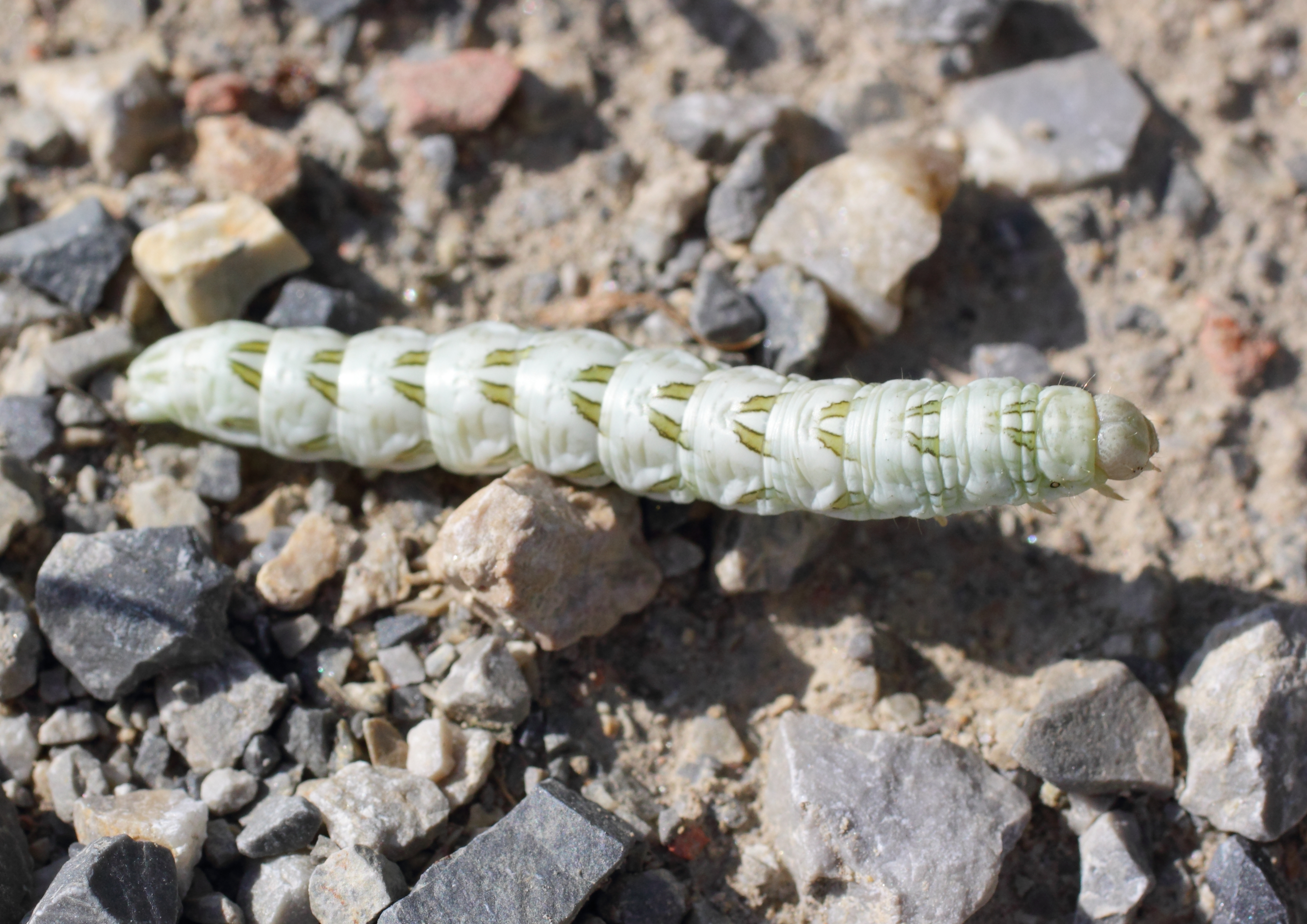
Cucullia chamomillae (white form)

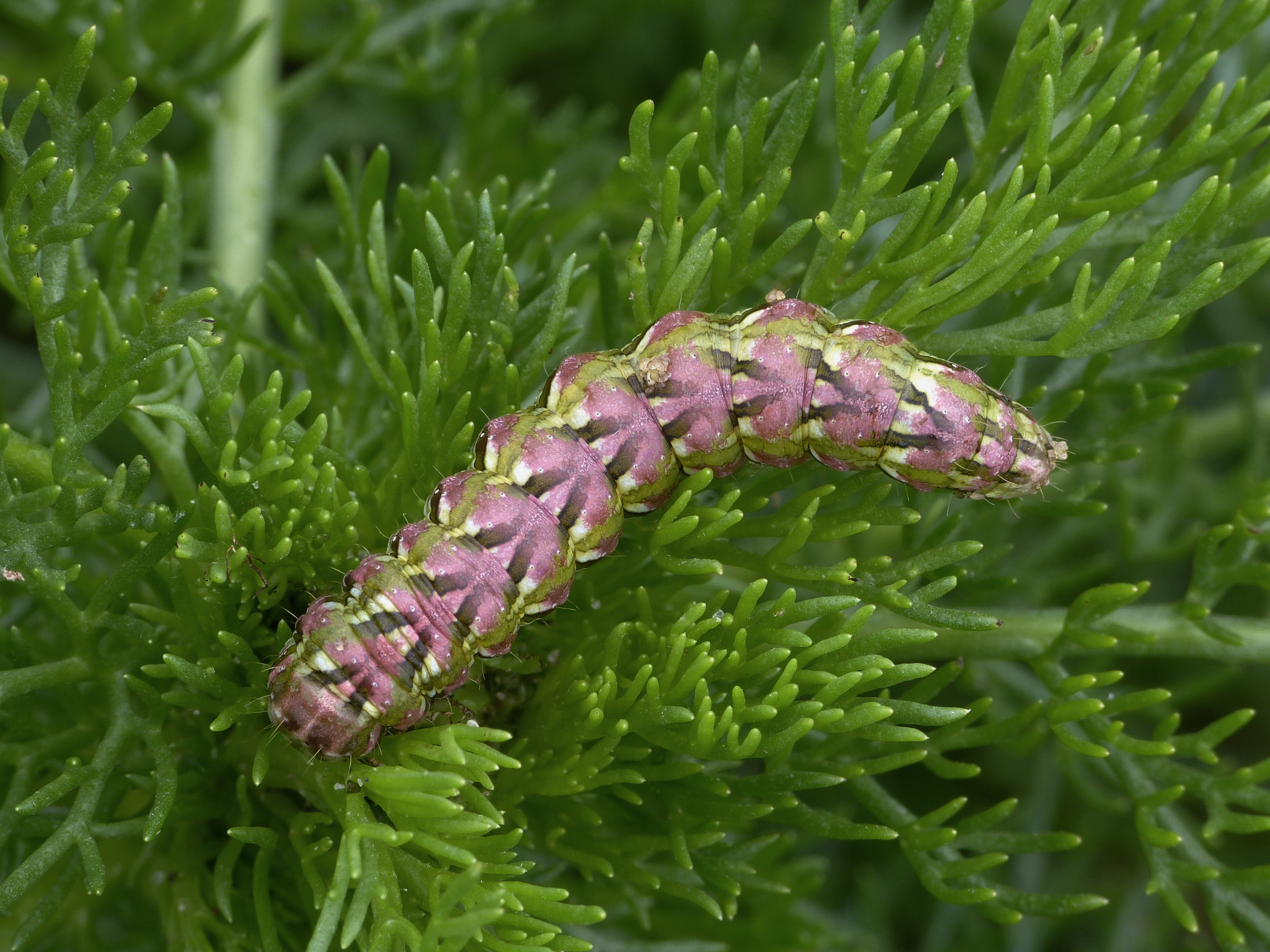
Cucullia chamomillae (red form)

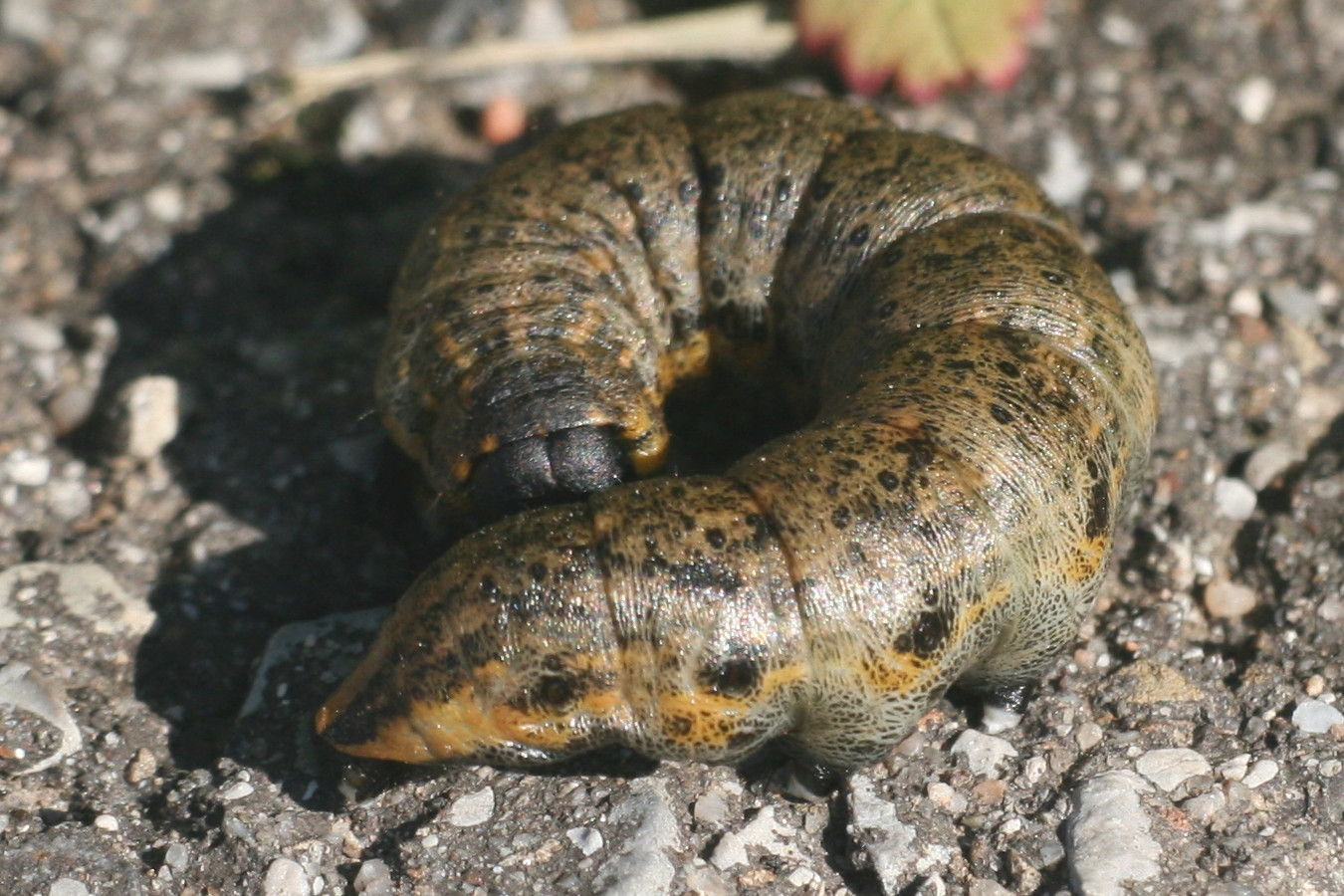
Cucullia umbratica

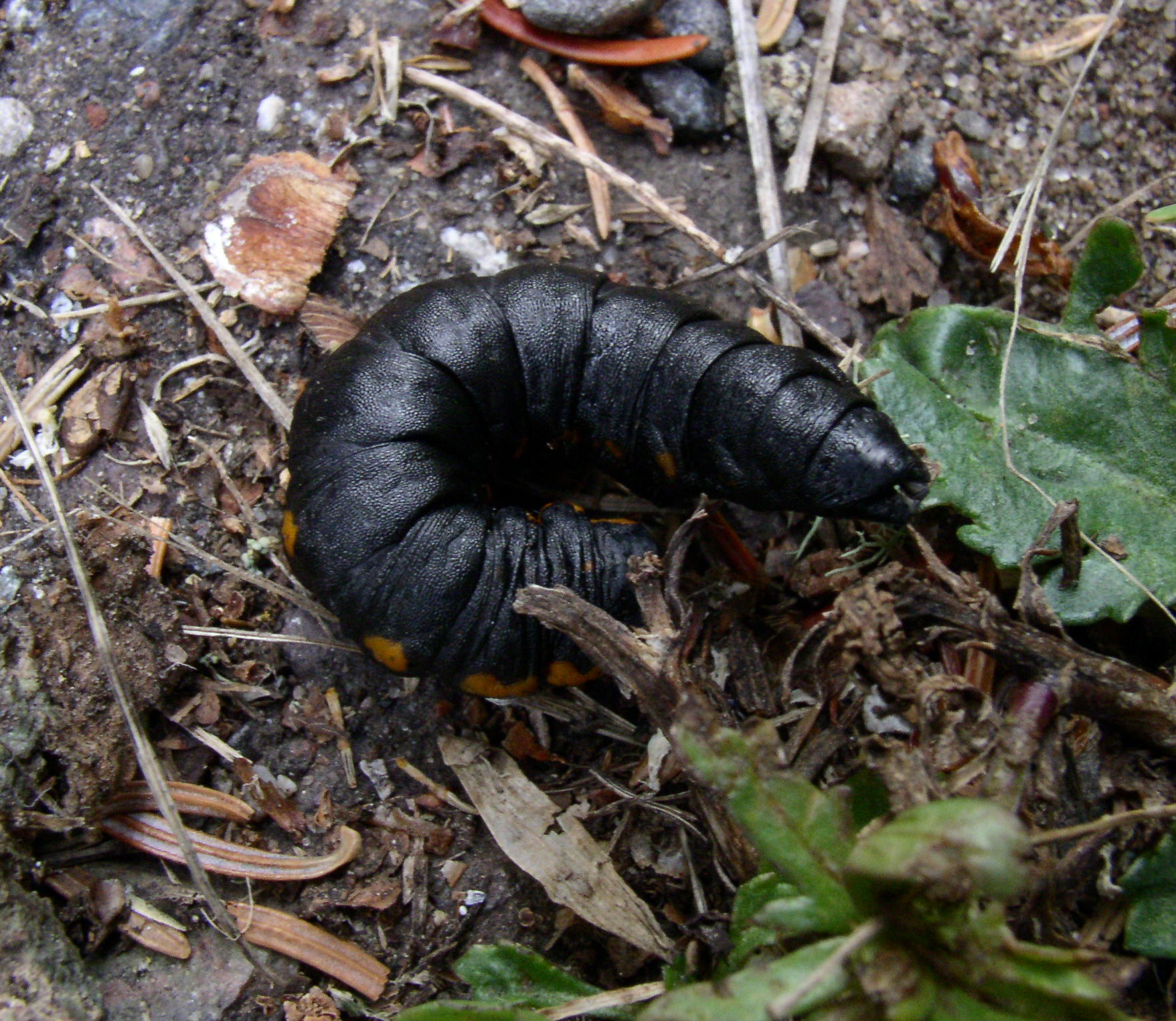
Cucullia intermedia

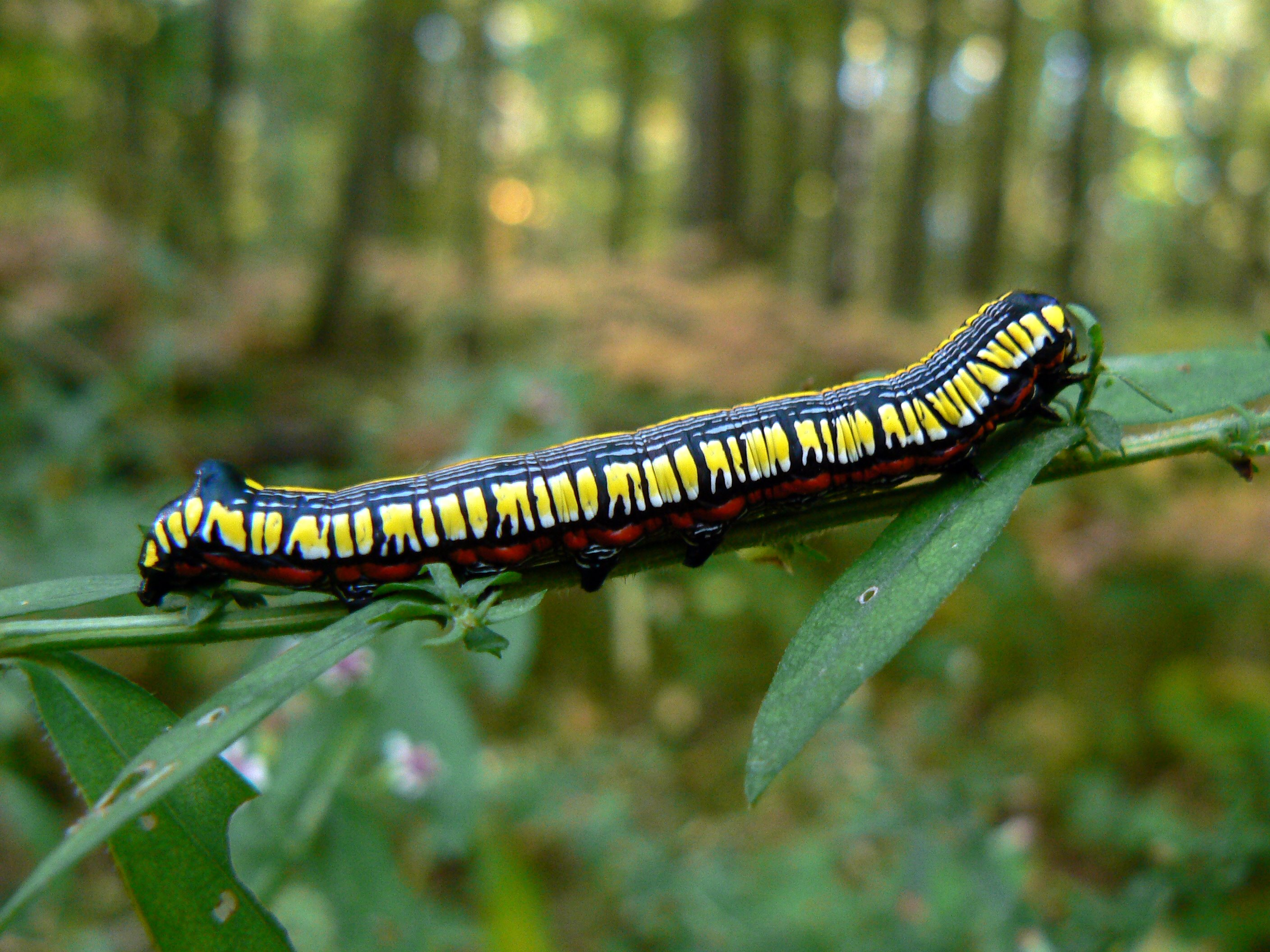
Cucullia convexipennis

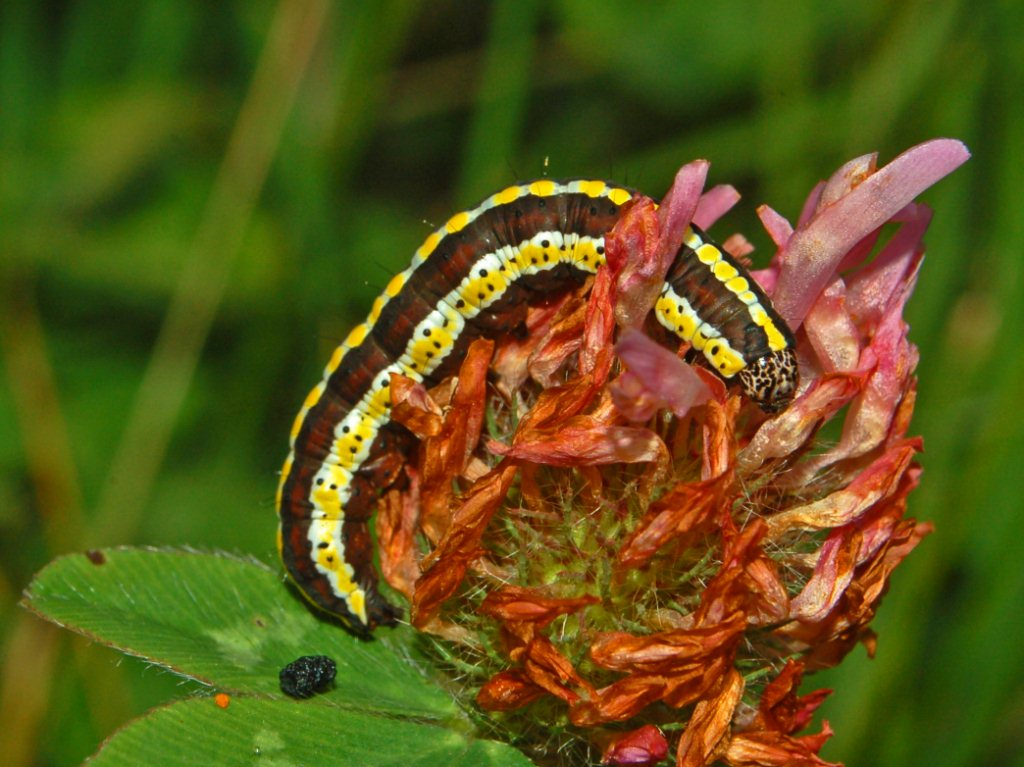
Cucullia lucifuga

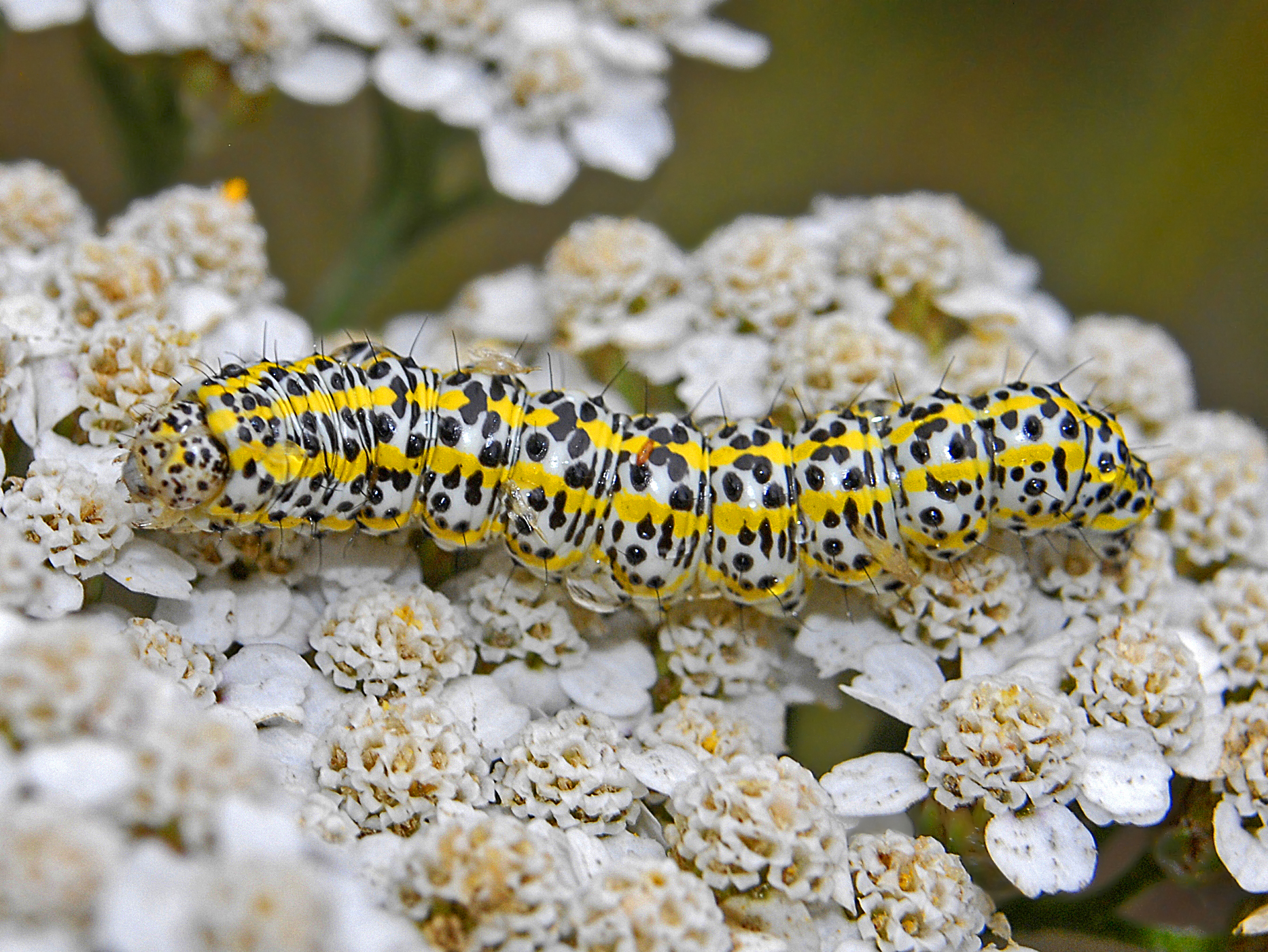
Cucullia tanaceti

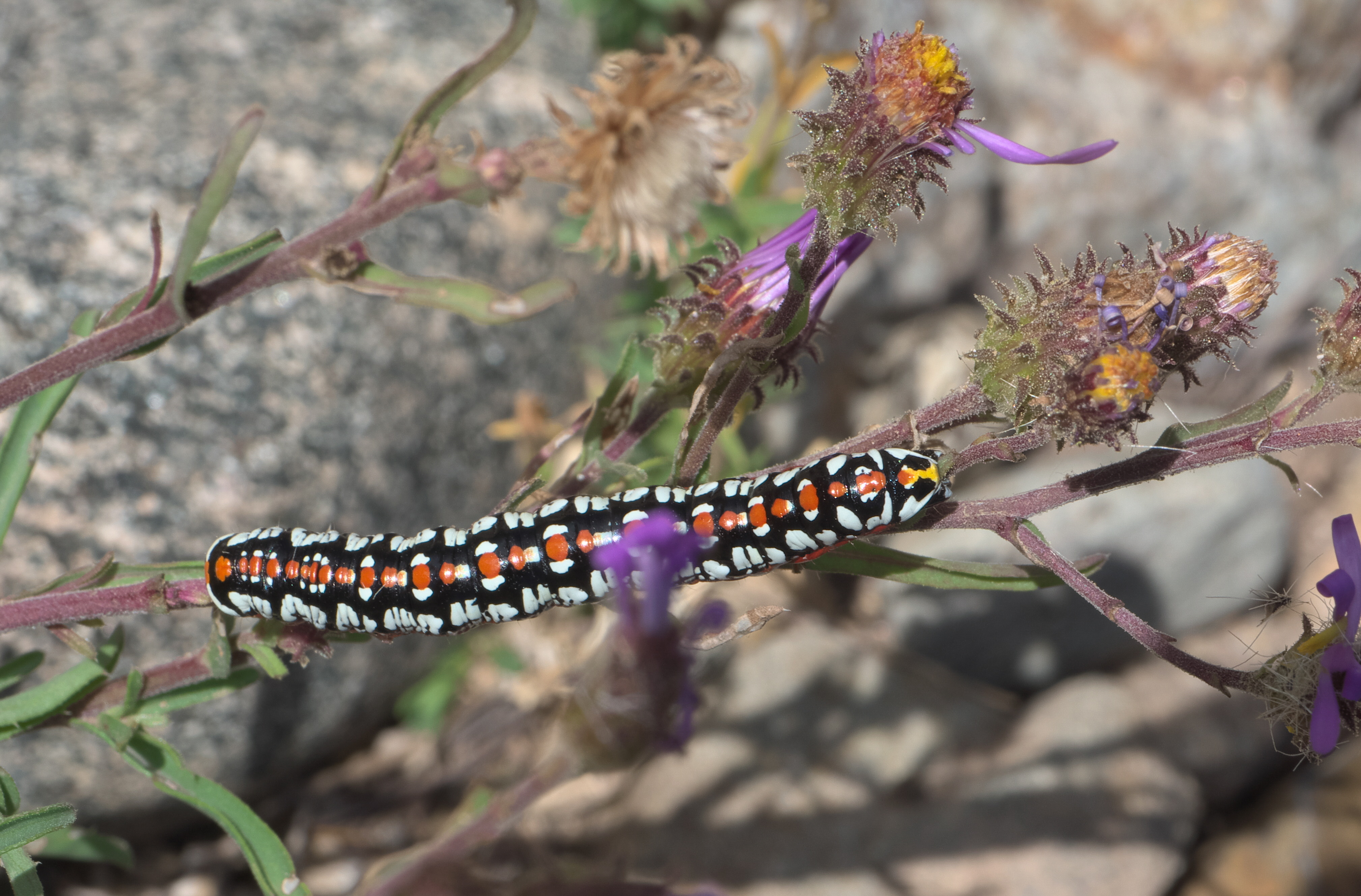
Cucullia dorsalis

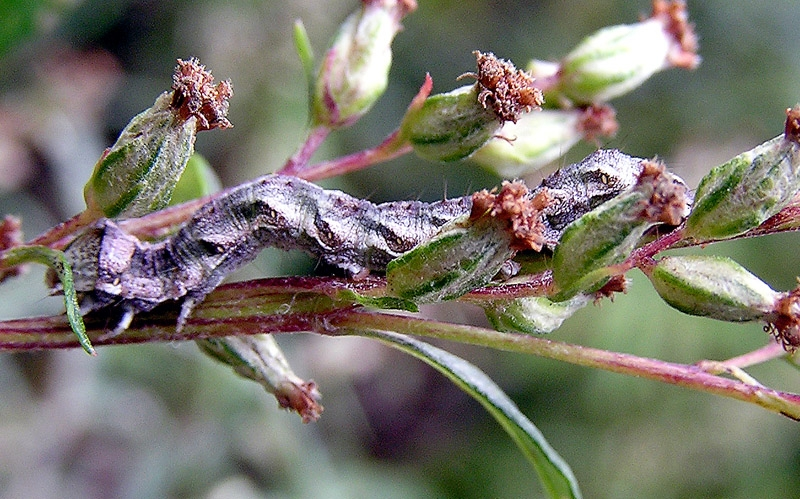
Cucullia fraudatrix

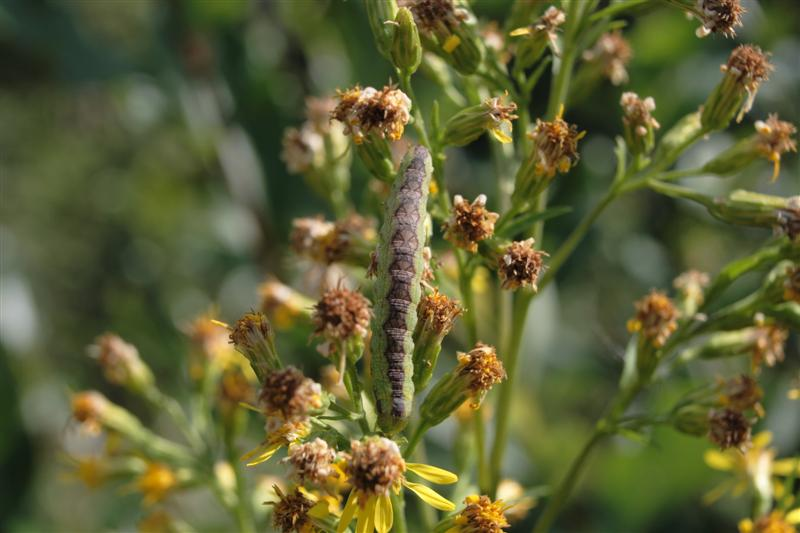
Cucullia gnaphalii

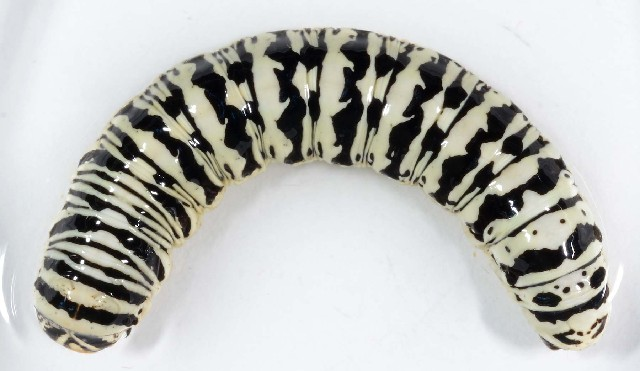
Cucullia speyeri

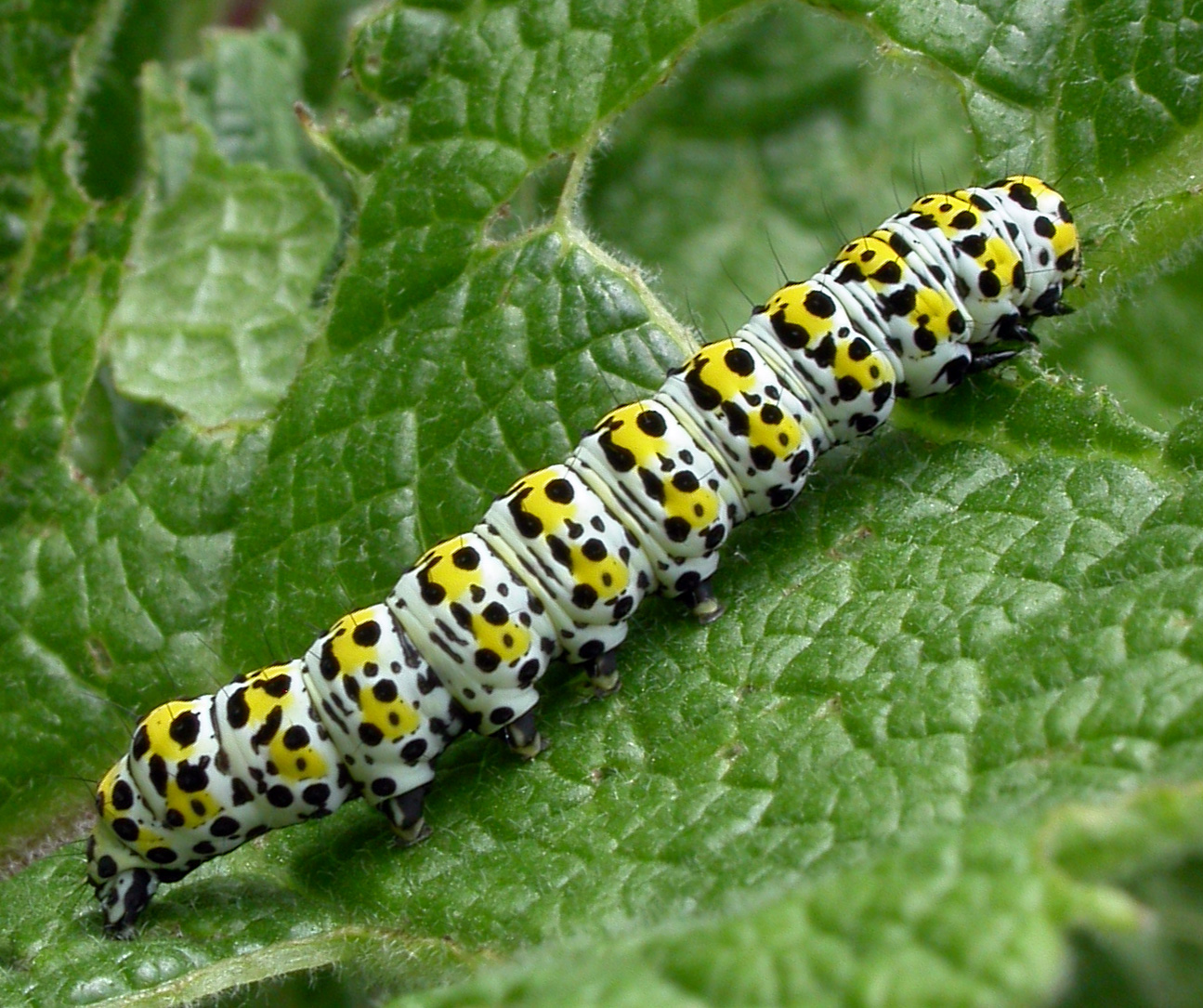
Cucullia verbasci
