= Cucullia serraticornis =

Scientific classification
- Domain: Eukaryota
- Kingdom: Animalia
- Phylum: Arthropoda
- Class: Insecta
- Order: Lepidoptera
- Superfamily: Noctuoidea
- Family: Noctuidae
- Genus: Cucullia
- Species: C. serraticornis

Binomial name
- Cucullia serraticornis Lintner, 1874

Synonyms
- Cucullia solidaginis (Strecker, 1874)

Species of moth

Cucullia serraticornis is a species of moth in the family Noctuidae (the owlet moths). It is found in North America.

The MONA or Hodges number for Cucullia serraticornis is 10184.
