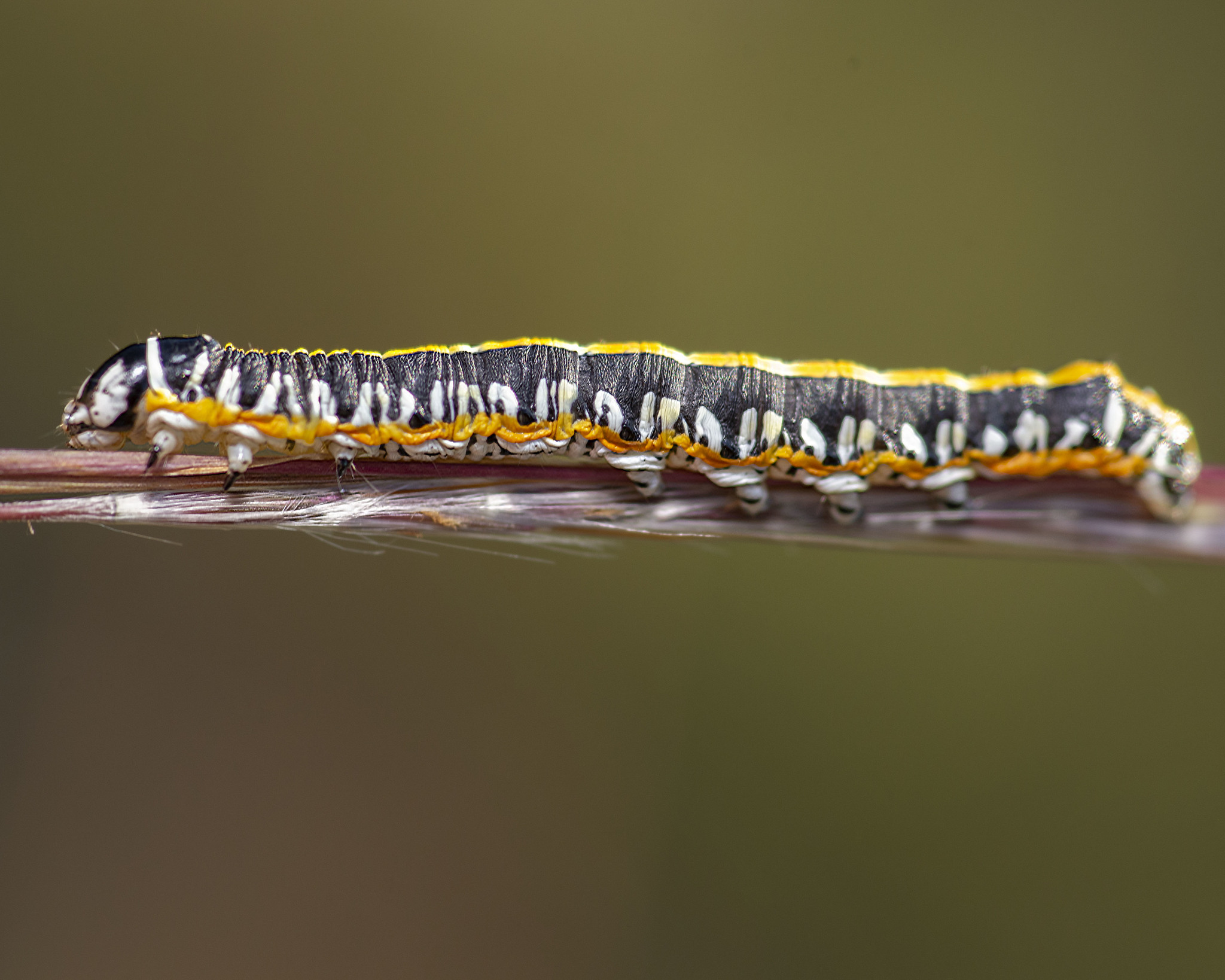
- Larva

Scientific classification
- Domain: Eukaryota
- Kingdom: Animalia
- Phylum: Arthropoda
- Class: Insecta
- Order: Lepidoptera
- Superfamily: Noctuoidea
- Family: Noctuidae
- Genus: Cucullia
- Species: C. alfarata

Binomial name
- Cucullia alfarata Strecker, 1898

= Cucullia alfarata =

Species of moth

Cucullia alfarata, the camphorweed cucullia, is a species of moth in the family Noctuidae (the owlet moths). It is found in North America.
