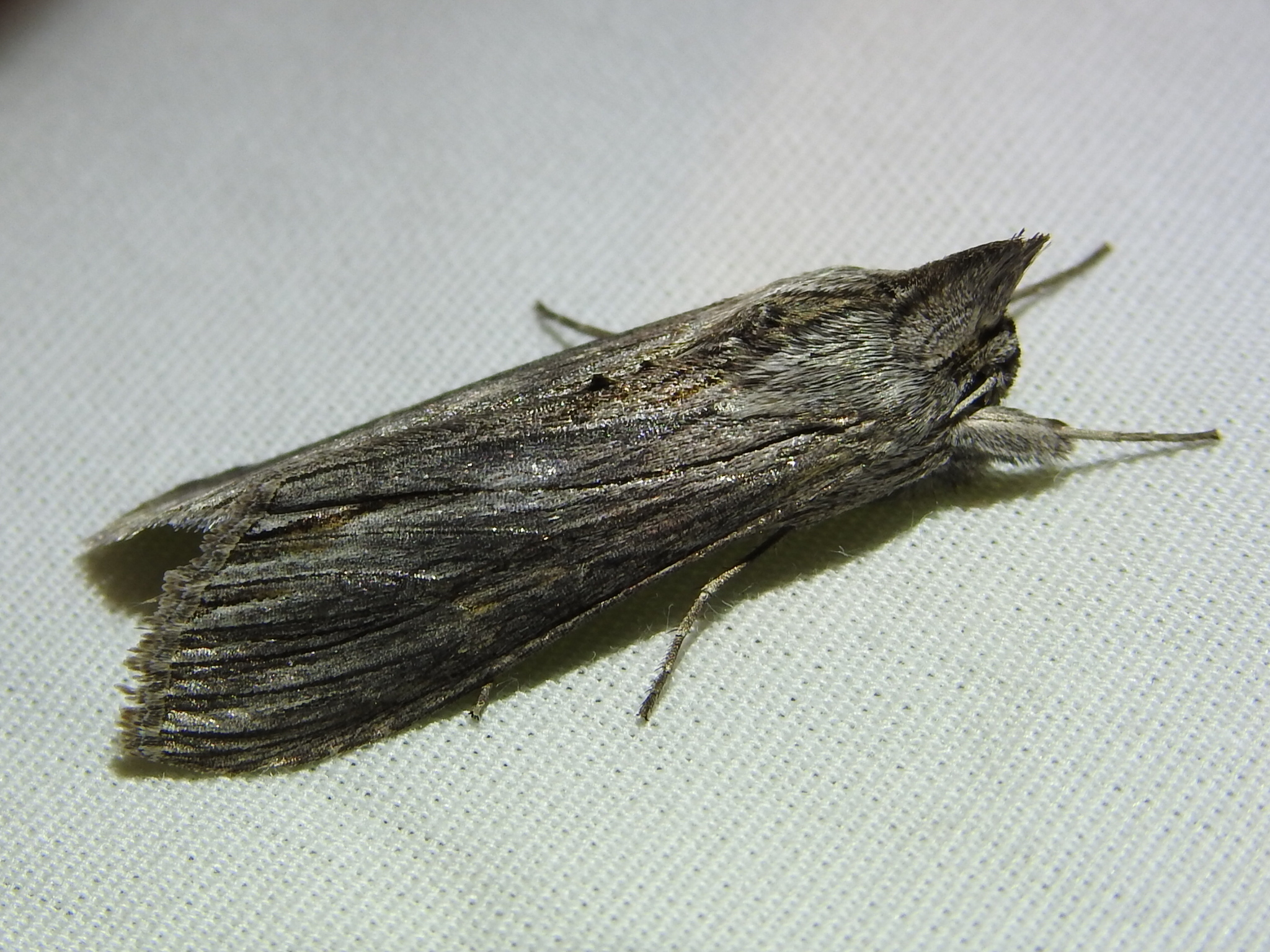
- In Texas, US

Scientific classification
- Kingdom: Animalia
- Phylum: Arthropoda
- Clade: Pancrustacea
- Class: Insecta
- Order: Lepidoptera
- Superfamily: Noctuoidea
- Family: Noctuidae
- Genus: Cucullia
- Species: C. laetifica

Binomial name
- Cucullia laetifica Lintner, 1875

= Cucullia laetifica =

Species of moth

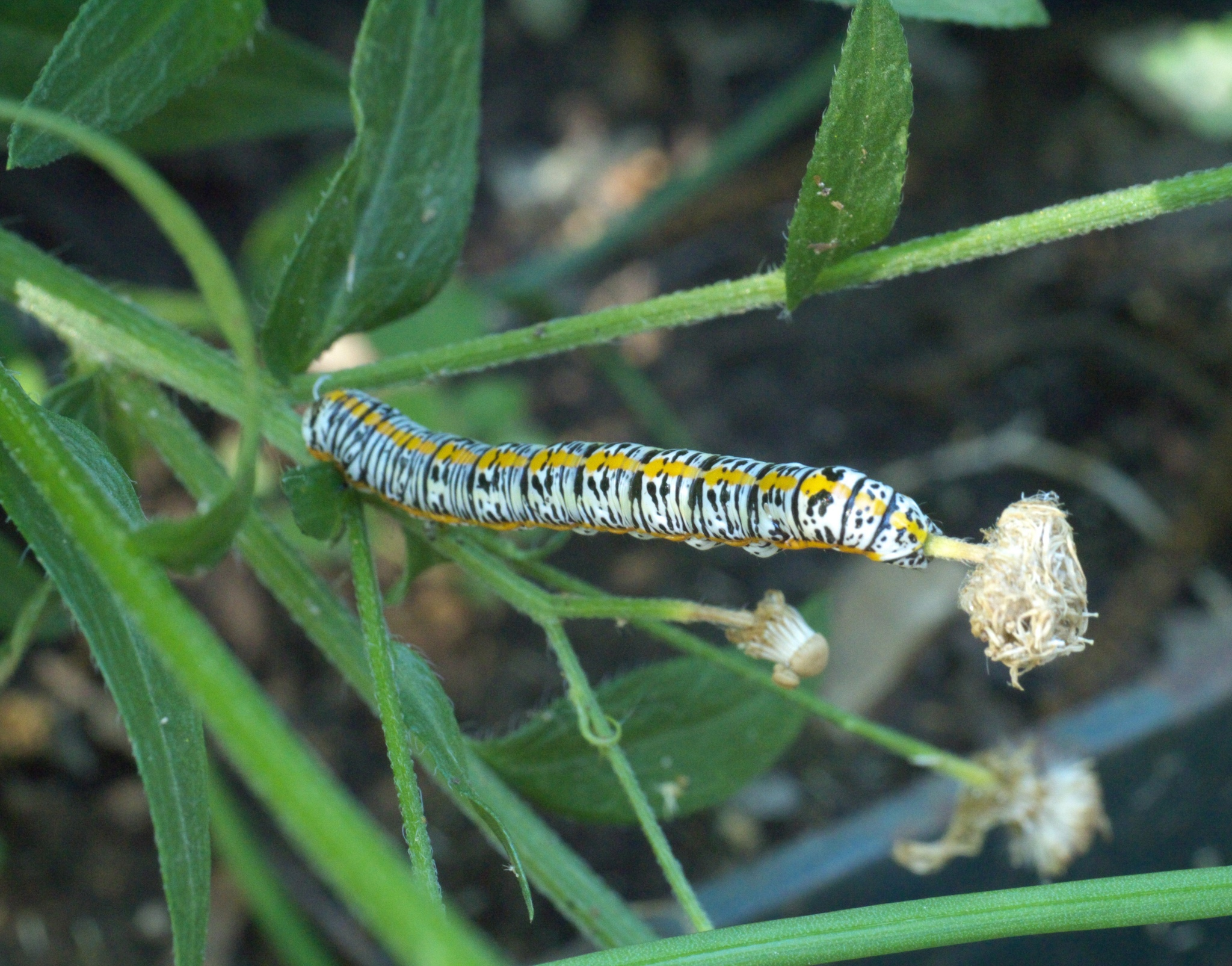
Cucullia laetifica, Oklahoma

Cucullia laetifica is a species of moth in the family Noctuidae (the owlet moths). It is found in North America.
