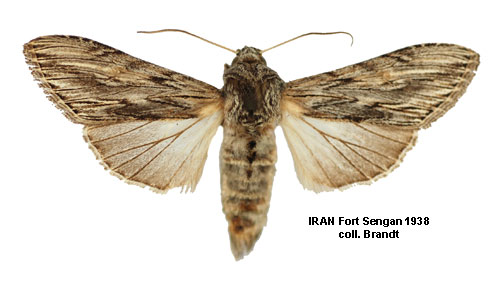

Scientific classification
- Domain: Eukaryota
- Kingdom: Animalia
- Phylum: Arthropoda
- Class: Insecta
- Order: Lepidoptera
- Superfamily: Noctuoidea
- Family: Noctuidae
- Genus: Cucullia
- Species: C. boryphora

Binomial name
- Cucullia boryphora Fischer de Waldheim, 1840

Synonyms
- Cucullia lignata Guenée, 1841; Cucullia rimula Freyer, 1841

= Cucullia boryphora =

Species of moth

Cucullia boryphora is a moth of the family Noctuidae first described by Gotthelf Fischer von Waldheim in 1840. It is found in the semi-arid and xeromountain areas of the Near East and Middle East, from the European part of southern Russia to Turkestan, the western Himalayas (northern Pakistan), Afghanistan, Iran, Saudi Arabia and United Arab Emirates.

Adults are on wing from February to April. There is one generation per year.

The larvae probably feed on Artemisia species.
