= Cucullia pulla =

Scientific classification
- Kingdom: Animalia
- Phylum: Arthropoda
- Class: Insecta
- Order: Lepidoptera
- Superfamily: Noctuoidea
- Family: Noctuidae
- Genus: Cucullia
- Species: C. pulla

Binomial name
- Cucullia pulla (Grote, 1881)

Synonyms
- Cucullia spauldingi (Barnes & Benjamin, 1922)

Species of moth

Cucullia pulla is a species of moth in the family Noctuidae (the owlet moths). It was first described by Augustus Radcliffe Grote in 1881 and it is found in North America.

The MONA or Hodges number for Cucullia pulla is 10180.
