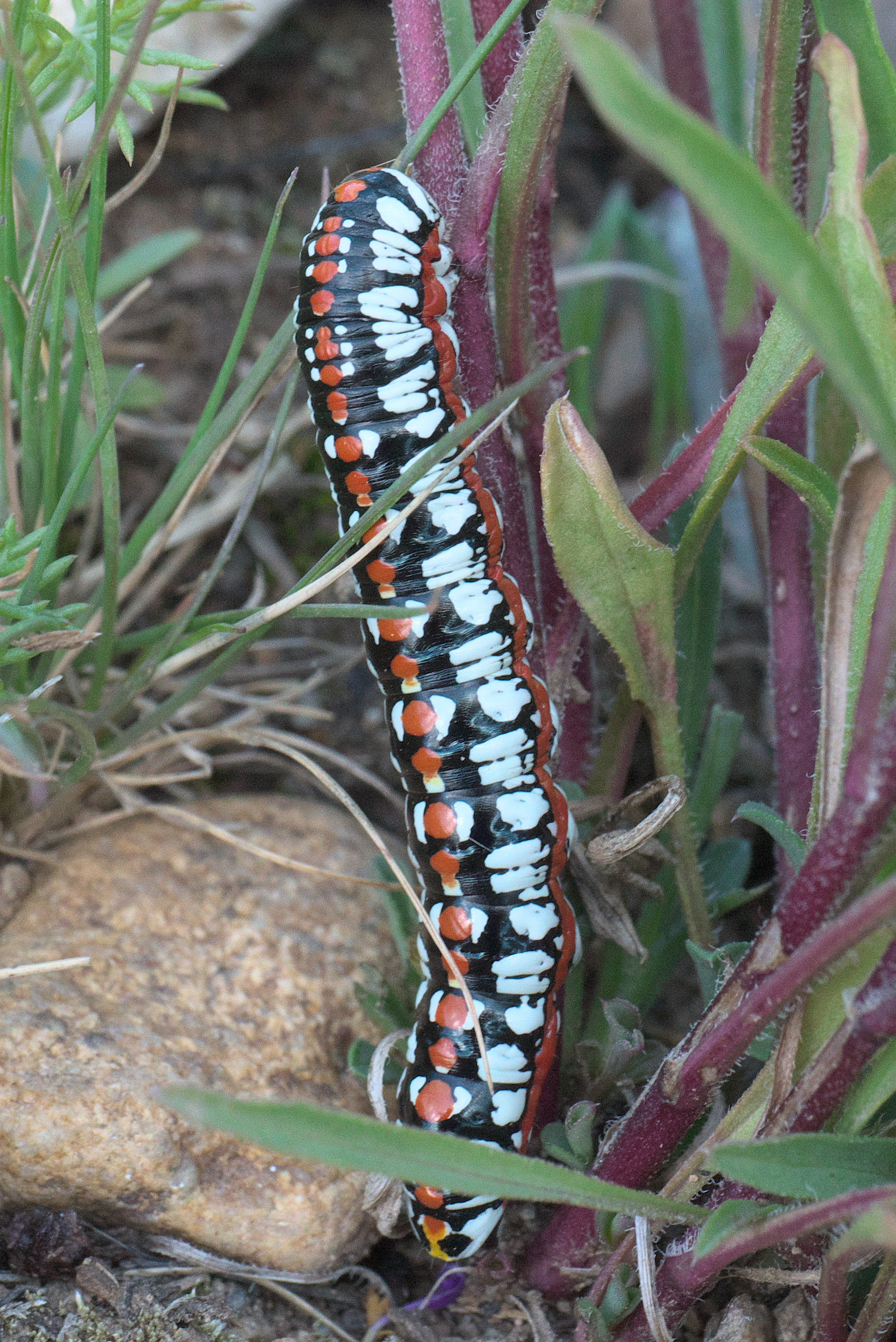

Scientific classification
- Kingdom: Animalia
- Phylum: Arthropoda
- Clade: Pancrustacea
- Class: Insecta
- Order: Lepidoptera
- Superfamily: Noctuoidea
- Family: Noctuidae
- Genus: Cucullia
- Species: C. dorsalis

Binomial name
- Cucullia dorsalis Smith, 1892

= Cucullia dorsalis =

Species of moth

Cucullia dorsalis is a species of moth in the family Noctuidae (the owlet moths). It is found in North America.
