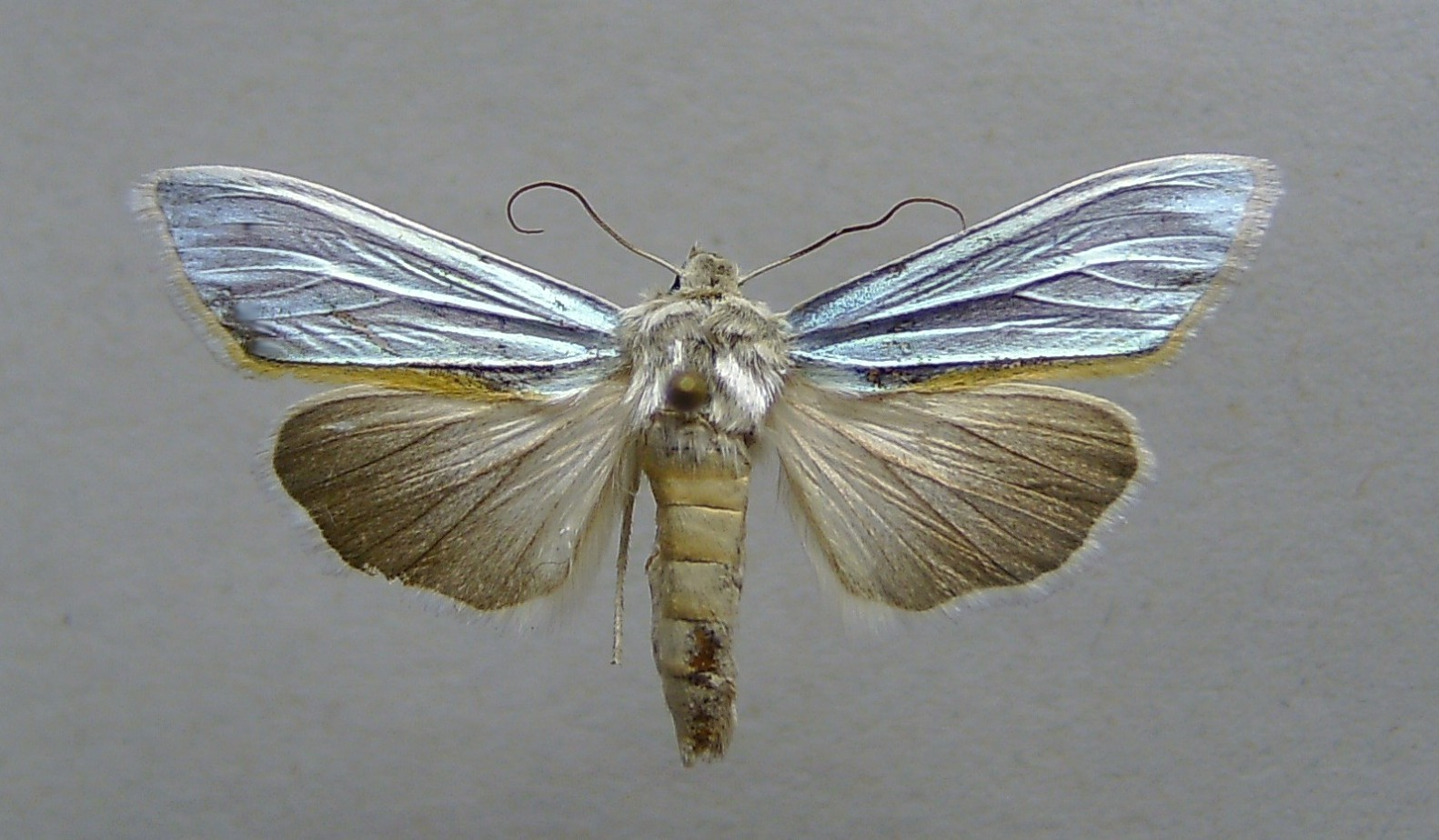

Scientific classification
- Domain: Eukaryota
- Kingdom: Animalia
- Phylum: Arthropoda
- Class: Insecta
- Order: Lepidoptera
- Superfamily: Noctuoidea
- Family: Noctuidae
- Genus: Cucullia
- Species: C. splendida

Binomial name
- Cucullia splendida (Stoll, 1782)

Synonyms
- Phalaena (Noctua) splendida Stoll, [1782]; Cucullia argyrea Freyer, 1840; Cucullia argyrea Boisduval, 1840

= Cucullia splendida =

Species of moth

Cucullia splendida is a species of moth of the family Noctuidae first described by Caspar Stoll in 1782. It is found in Russia and parts of Africa, Asia and America.

The wingspan is 28–34 mm.

The larvae possibly feed on Artemisia species.
