= Cucullia macara =

Scientific classification
- Domain: Eukaryota
- Kingdom: Animalia
- Phylum: Arthropoda
- Class: Insecta
- Order: Lepidoptera
- Superfamily: Noctuoidea
- Family: Noctuidae
- Genus: Cucullia
- Species: C. macara

Binomial name
- Cucullia macara Rebel, 1948

Synonyms
- Cucullia leptographa Reisser, 1958

Species of moth

Cucullia macara is a moth of the family Noctuidae first described by Hans Rebel in 1948. It has been recorded from North Africa the Levant and the Arabian Peninsula.

Adults are on wing from December to February. There is one generation per year.
