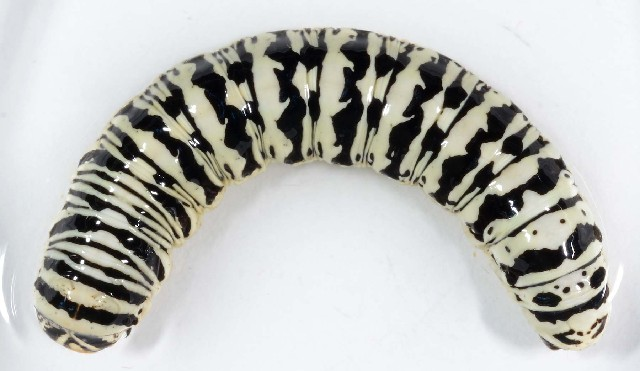
- Larva

Scientific classification
- Kingdom: Animalia
- Phylum: Arthropoda
- Class: Insecta
- Order: Lepidoptera
- Superfamily: Noctuoidea
- Family: Noctuidae
- Genus: Cucullia
- Species: C. speyeri

Binomial name
- Cucullia speyeri Lintner, 1874

= Cucullia speyeri =

Species of moth

Cucullia speyeri, common names Speyer's paint, Speyer's cucullia or Speyer's hooded owlet moth, is a moth found in North America. It is found from Alberta and Montana to the Atlantic coast from New Hampshire to Virginia. It was described by Joseph Albert Lintner in 1874. In the US state of Connecticut, it is listed as a species of special concern and is believed to be extirpated. The habitat consists of open meadows, dry grasslands and native prairies.

The wingspan is about 48 mm (1.9 in). Adults are on wing in late spring and summer.

The larvae feed on herbaceous Asteraceae and Conyza species.
