= Cucullia omissa =

Scientific classification
- Domain: Eukaryota
- Kingdom: Animalia
- Phylum: Arthropoda
- Class: Insecta
- Order: Lepidoptera
- Superfamily: Noctuoidea
- Family: Noctuidae
- Genus: Cucullia
- Species: C. omissa

Binomial name
- Cucullia omissa Dod, 1916

Species of moth

Cucullia omissa, known generally as the omitted cucullia or Alberta falconer, is a species of moth in the family Noctuidae (the owlet moths). It is found in North America.

The MONA or Hodges number for Cucullia omissa is 10199.
