= Cucullia eucaena =

Scientific classification
- Kingdom: Animalia
- Phylum: Arthropoda
- Class: Insecta
- Order: Lepidoptera
- Superfamily: Noctuoidea
- Family: Noctuidae
- Genus: Cucullia
- Species: C. eucaena

Binomial name
- Cucullia eucaena Dyar, 1919

Species of moth

Cucullia eucaena is a species of moth in the family Noctuidae (the owlet moths). It is found in North America.

The MONA or Hodges number for Cucullia eucaena is 10201.1.
