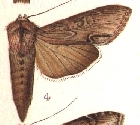

Scientific classification
- Kingdom: Animalia
- Phylum: Arthropoda
- Clade: Pancrustacea
- Class: Insecta
- Order: Lepidoptera
- Superfamily: Noctuoidea
- Family: Noctuidae
- Genus: Cucullia
- Species: C. florea

Binomial name
- Cucullia florea Guenée, 1852

Synonyms
- Cucullia obscurior Guenée, 1852

= Cucullia florea =

Species of moth

Cucullia florea, the gray hooded owlet, is a species of moth in the family Noctuidae (the owlet moths). It is found in North America.

The MONA or Hodges number for Cucullia florea is 10197.
