= Cucullia antipoda =

Scientific classification
- Domain: Eukaryota
- Kingdom: Animalia
- Phylum: Arthropoda
- Class: Insecta
- Order: Lepidoptera
- Superfamily: Noctuoidea
- Family: Noctuidae
- Genus: Cucullia
- Species: C. antipoda

Binomial name
- Cucullia antipoda Strecker, 1878

Synonyms
- Cucullia luteodisca (Smith, 1909)

Species of moth

Cucullia antipoda is a species of moth in the family Noctuidae (the owlet moths) found in North America.

The MONA or Hodges number for Cucullia antipoda is 10206.
