= Cucullia mcdunnoughi =

Scientific classification
- Domain: Eukaryota
- Kingdom: Animalia
- Phylum: Arthropoda
- Class: Insecta
- Order: Lepidoptera
- Superfamily: Noctuoidea
- Family: Noctuidae
- Genus: Cucullia
- Species: C. mcdunnoughi

Binomial name
- Cucullia mcdunnoughi (Henne, 1940)

Species of moth

Cucullia mcdunnoughi is a species of moth in the family Noctuidae (the owlet moths). It is found in North America.

The MONA or Hodges number for Cucullia mcdunnoughi is 10208.
