= Cucullia improba =

Scientific classification
- Domain: Eukaryota
- Kingdom: Animalia
- Phylum: Arthropoda
- Class: Insecta
- Order: Lepidoptera
- Superfamily: Noctuoidea
- Family: Noctuidae
- Genus: Cucullia
- Species: C. improba

Binomial name
- Cucullia improba Christoph, 1885

Synonyms
- Cucullia leptographa Reisser, 1958

Species of moth

Cucullia improba is a moth of the family Noctuidae first described by Hugo Theodor Christoph in 1885. It is found in the south-eastern Caucasus, Turkmenistan, Uzbekistan, Iran, Afghanistan, Turkey, Jordan and Israel.

Adults are on wing from March to April. There is one generation per year.

The larvae probably feed on Artemisia species.

== Subspecies ==
- Cucullia improba improba
- Cucullia improba muelleri (Israel)
