= Cucullia strigata =

Scientific classification
- Domain: Eukaryota
- Kingdom: Animalia
- Phylum: Arthropoda
- Class: Insecta
- Order: Lepidoptera
- Superfamily: Noctuoidea
- Family: Noctuidae
- Genus: Cucullia
- Species: C. strigata

Binomial name
- Cucullia strigata (Smith, 1892)

Synonyms
- Cucullia brucei (Smith, 1903); Cucullia ketchikana (Barnes & Benjamin, 1922)

Species of moth

Cucullia strigata, the streaked hooded owlet or streaky falconer, is a species of moth in the family Noctuidae (the owlet moths). It was first described by Smith in 1892 and it is found in North America.

The MONA or Hodges number for Cucullia strigata is 10183.
