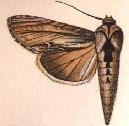

Scientific classification
- Domain: Eukaryota
- Kingdom: Animalia
- Phylum: Arthropoda
- Class: Insecta
- Order: Lepidoptera
- Superfamily: Noctuoidea
- Family: Noctuidae
- Genus: Cucullia
- Species: C. oribac

Binomial name
- Cucullia oribac Barnes, 1904

Synonyms
- Cucullia strigata Schaus, 1898 (A junior primary homonym of Cucullia strigata Smith, 1892); Cucullia oribac Barnes, 1904; Cucullia oribae; Cucullia arizona Smith, 1905; Cucullia perstrigata Hampson, 1906

= Cucullia oribac =

Species of moth

Cucullia oribac is a moth of the family Noctuidae first described by William Barnes in 1904. It is found in Mexico and the southwestern United States. In the United States, it is found in the mountains of southern Arizona, north to Gila County. It is also found in southwestern New Mexico, and the Guadalupe Mountains in western Texas. In Mexico, it is known from the Federal District, Veracruz, Morelos and Chiapas.

Adults are on wing in July in the United States.

Larvae have been reared on Baccharis cordigera and Baccharis bigelovii.
