= Cucullia balsamitae =

Scientific classification
- Domain: Eukaryota
- Kingdom: Animalia
- Phylum: Arthropoda
- Class: Insecta
- Order: Lepidoptera
- Superfamily: Noctuoidea
- Family: Noctuidae
- Genus: Cucullia
- Species: C. balsamitae

Binomial name
- Cucullia balsamitae Boisduval, 1840

Species of moth

Cucullia balsamitae is a moth belonging to the family Noctuidae. The species was first described by Jean Baptiste Boisduval in 1840.

It is native to Europe.
