= Cucullia montanae =

Scientific classification
- Kingdom: Animalia
- Phylum: Arthropoda
- Class: Insecta
- Order: Lepidoptera
- Superfamily: Noctuoidea
- Family: Noctuidae
- Genus: Cucullia
- Species: C. montanae

Binomial name
- Cucullia montanae Grote, 1882

Species of moth

Cucullia montanae, the mountain hooded owlet, is a species of moth in the family Noctuidae (the owlet moths). It is found in North America.

The MONA or Hodges number for Cucullia montanae is 10201.
