= Cucullia lethe =

Scientific classification
- Domain: Eukaryota
- Kingdom: Animalia
- Phylum: Arthropoda
- Class: Insecta
- Order: Lepidoptera
- Superfamily: Noctuoidea
- Family: Noctuidae
- Genus: Cucullia
- Species: C. lethe

Binomial name
- Cucullia lethe Poole, 1995

Species of moth

Cucullia lethe is a species of moth in the family Noctuidae (the owlet moths). It is found in North America.

The MONA or Hodges number for Cucullia lethe is 10191.1.
