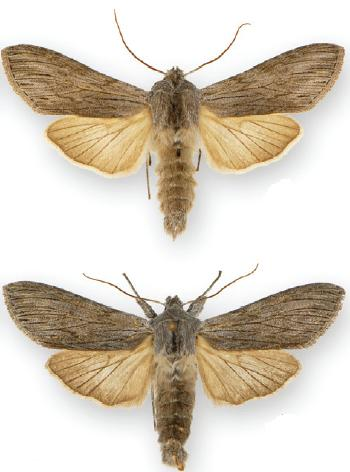
- Male (top) and female

Scientific classification
- Kingdom: Animalia
- Phylum: Arthropoda
- Class: Insecta
- Order: Lepidoptera
- Superfamily: Noctuoidea
- Family: Noctuidae
- Genus: Cucullia
- Species: C. intermedia

Binomial name
- Cucullia intermedia Speyer, 1870

Synonyms
- Cucullia intermedia cinderella Smith, 1892; Cucullia cinderella Smith, 1892

= Cucullia intermedia =

Species of moth

Cucullia intermedia, the dusky hooded owlet, intermediate cucullia, goldenrod cutworm or intermediate hooded owlet, is a moth of the family Noctuidae. The species was first described by Adolph Speyer in 1870. It is found from coast to coast across southern Canada and the northern United States, south in the west to California and to Pennsylvania in the east. In the Rocky Mountains it is found south to the White Mountains in east-central Arizona and occurs commonly in Utah, Colorado and north-eastern Nevada.

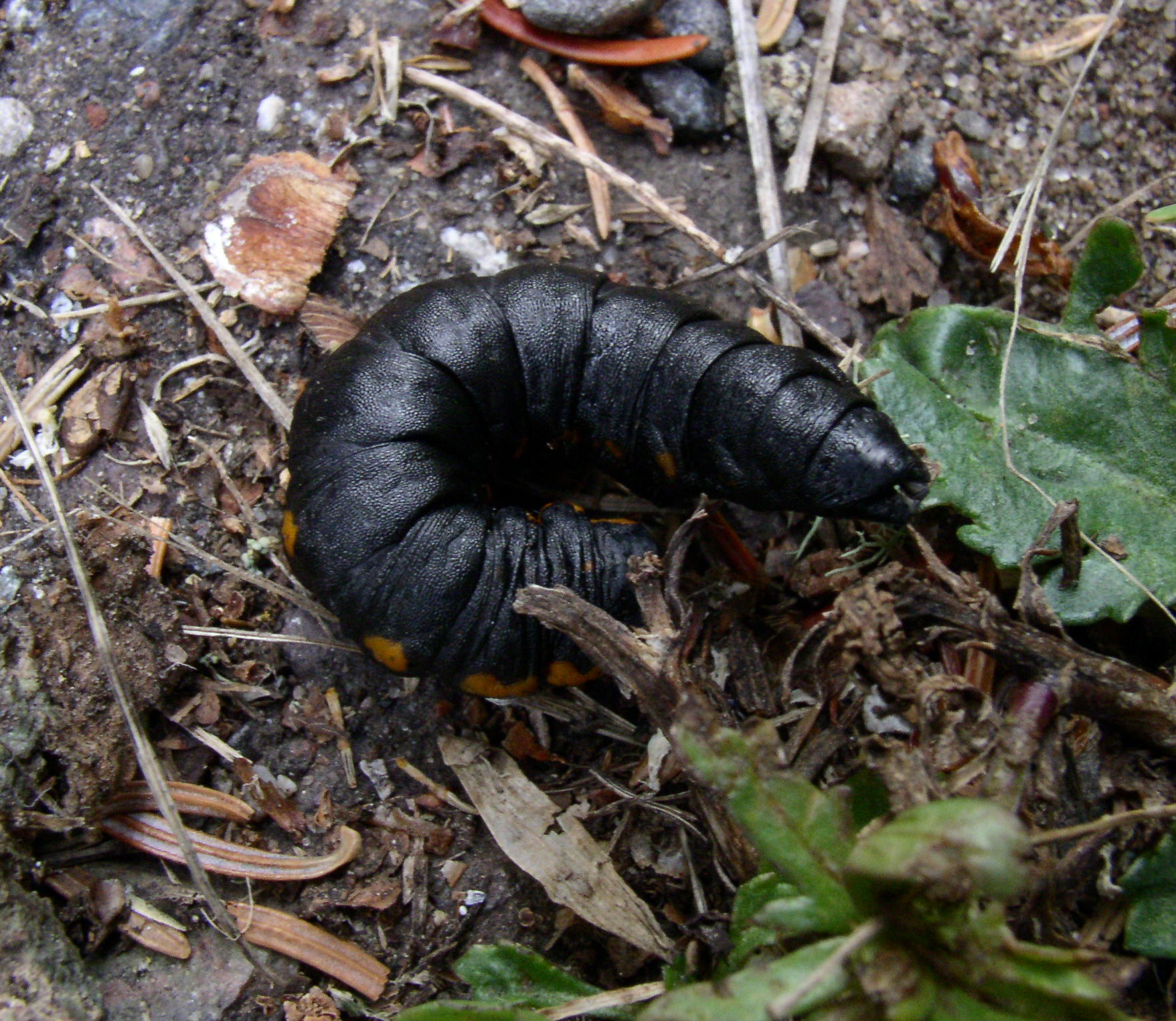
Caterpillar

The wingspan is 45–50 mm. Adults are on wing from May to October. There are two generations per year.

The larvae feed on the leaves of birch, poplar, willow and other trees and shrubs, as well as flowers of Lactuca and other Asteraceae species.
