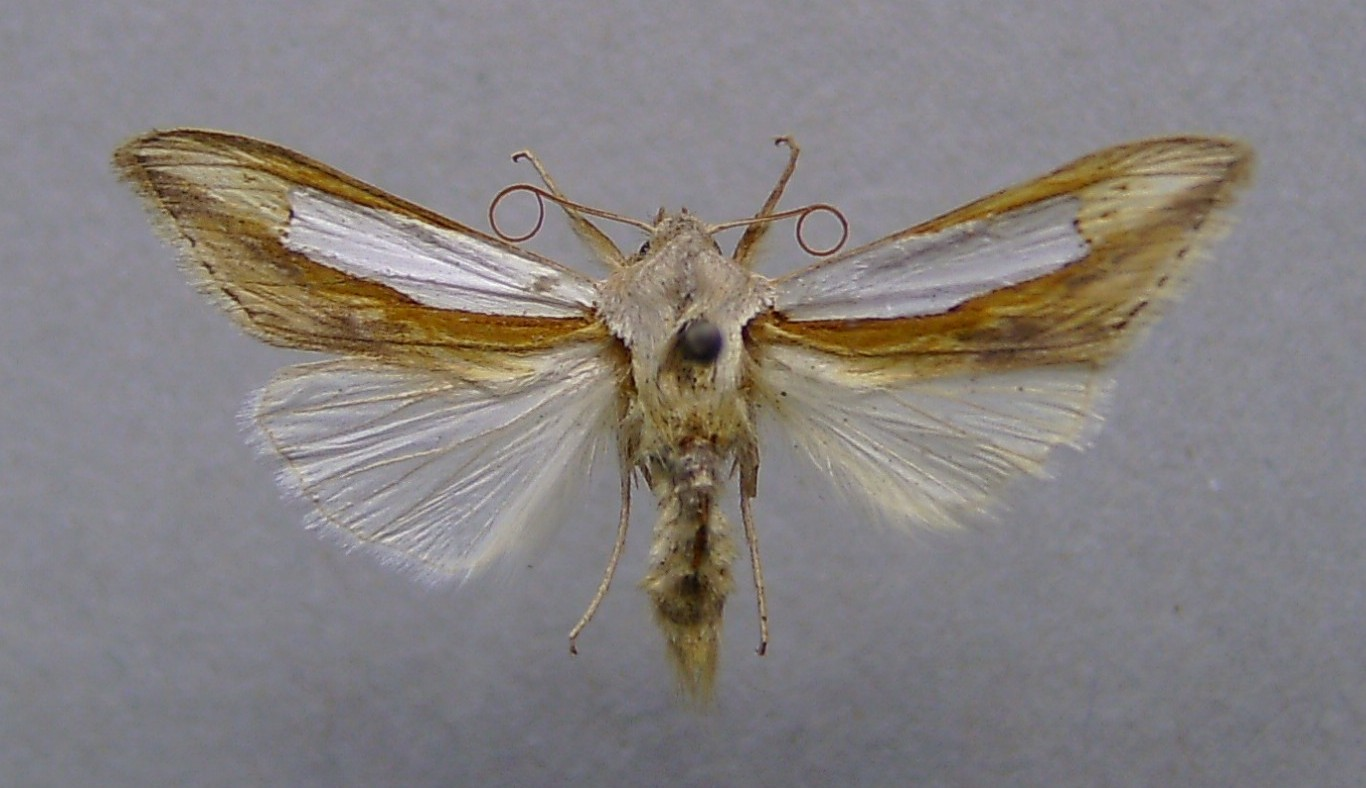

Scientific classification
- Kingdom: Animalia
- Phylum: Arthropoda
- Class: Insecta
- Order: Lepidoptera
- Superfamily: Noctuoidea
- Family: Noctuidae
- Genus: Cucullia
- Species: C. argentina

Binomial name
- Cucullia argentina (Fabricius, 1787)

Synonyms
- Noctua argentina Fabricius, 1787

= Cucullia argentina =

Species of moth

Cucullia argentina is a moth of the family Noctuidae. It is found from central Turkey throughout the Caucasus, Iraq, Iran, Turkmenistan, southern Russia, Kazakhstan and Afghanistan to Mongolia.

Adults are on wing from April to May and from July to August. There are two generations per year.

The larvae feed on the flowers of Artemisia species.
