= Cucullia eulepis =

Scientific classification
- Kingdom: Animalia
- Phylum: Arthropoda
- Clade: Pancrustacea
- Class: Insecta
- Order: Lepidoptera
- Superfamily: Noctuoidea
- Family: Noctuidae
- Genus: Cucullia
- Species: C. eulepis

Binomial name
- Cucullia eulepis (Grote, 1876)

Species of moth

Cucullia eulepis is a species of moth in the owlet moth family Noctuidae. It is found in North America.
