= List of moths of Israel (Noctuidae) =

This is a list of moths of the family Noctuidae (sensu Kitching & Rawlins, 1999) that are found in Israel. It also acts as an index to the species articles and forms part of the full List of moths of Israel. Subfamilies are listed alphabetically.

== Subfamily Acontiinae ==
- Acontia biskrensis (Oberthür, 1887)
- Acontia lucida (Hüfnagel, 1766)
- Acontia titania (Esper, 1798)
- Acontia trabealis (Scopoli, 1763)
- Aedia funesta (Esper, 1786)
- Aedia leucomelas (Linnaeus, 1758)
- Armada maritima Brandt, 1939
- Armada nilotica A. Bang-Haas, 1912
- Armada panaceorum (Ménétriès, 1849)
- Coccidiphaga scitula (Rambur, 1833)
- Diloba caeruleocephala (Linnaeus, 1758)
- Tarachephia hueberi (Ershov, 1874)

== Subfamily Acronictinae ==
- Acronicta aceris (Linnaeus, 1758)
- Acronicta psi (Linnaeus, 1758)
- Acronicta pasiphae Draudt, 1936
- Acronicta rumicis (Linnaeus, 1758)
- Acronicta tridens [Denis & Schiffermüller, 1775]
- Craniophora ligustri (Denis & Schiffermüller, 1775)
- Craniophora pontica (Staudinger, 1879)
- Craniophora melanisans Wiltshire, 1980

== Subfamily Amphipyrinae ==
- Pyrois effusa (Boisduval, 1828)
- Amphipyra pyramidea (Linnaeus, 1758)
- Amphipyra micans Lederer, 1857
- Amphipyra boursini Hacker, 1998
- Amphipyra tetra (Fabricius, 1787)
- Amphipyra stix Herrich-Schäffer, 1850

== Subfamily Bagisarinae ==
- Ozarba sancta (Staudinger, 1900)
- Pseudozarba bipartita (Herrich-Schäffer, 1850)
- Pseudozarba mesozona (Hampson, 1896)
- Xanthodes albago (Fabricius, 1794)

== Subfamily Bryophilinae ==
- Cryphia algae (Fabricius, 1775)
- Cryphia ochsi (Boursin, 1941)
- Cryphia tephrocharis Boursin, 1953
- Cryphia rectilinea (Warren, 1909)
- Cryphia amseli Boursin, 1952
- Cryphia labecula (Lederer, 1855)
- Cryphia raptricula ([Denis & Schiffermüller], 1775)
- Cryphia petrea (Guenée, 1852)
- Cryphia maeonis (Lederer, 1865)
- Cryphia paulina (Staudinger, 1892)
- Cryphia amasina (Draudt, 1931)
- Simyra dentinosa Freyer, 1839
- Victrix tabora (Staudinger, 1892)
- Victrix marginelota (de Joannis, 1888)

== Subfamily Catocalinae ==
- Acantholipes circumdata (Walker, 1858)
- Acantholipes regularis (Hübner, [1813])
- Aedia funesta (Esper, [1786])
- Aedia leucomelas (Linnaeus, 1758)
- Africalpe intrusa Krüger, 1939
- Anomis flava (Fabricius, 1775)
- Anomis sabulifera (Guenée, 1852)
- Antarchaea erubescens (A. Bang-Haas, 1906)
- Anumeta arabiae Wiltshire, 1961
- Anumeta asiatica Wiltshire, 1961
- Anumeta atrosignata (Walker, 1858)
- Anumeta hilgerti Rothschild, 1909
- Anumeta spilota Ershov, 1874
- Anumeta straminea (A. Bang-Haas, 1906)
- Anydrophila stuebeli (Calberla, 1891)
- Apopestes spectrum (Esper, [1787])
- Armada maritima Brandt, 1939
- Armada nilotica (A. Bang-Haas, 1906)
- Armada panaceorum (Ménétries, 1849)
- Autophila anaphanes Boursin, 1940
- Autophila cerealis (Staudinger, 1871)
- Autophila einsleri Amsel, 1935
- Autophila libanotica (Staudinger, 1901)
- Autophila ligaminosa (Eversmann, 1851)
- Autophila limbata (Staudinger, 1871)
- Autophila pauli Boursin, 1940
- Catephia alchymista ([Denis & Schiffermüller, 1775)
- Catocala amnonfreidbergi (Kravchenko et al., 2008)
- Catocala brandti Hacker & Kaut, 1999
- Catocala conjuncta (Esper, [1787])
- Catocala conversa (Esper, [1787])
- Catocala disjuncta (Geyer, 1828)
- Catocala diversa (Geyer, [1828])
- Catocala editarevayae Kravchenko et al., 2008
- Catocala elocata (Esper, [1787])
- Catocala eutychea (Treitschke, 1835)
- Catocala hymenaea ([Denis & Schiffermüller], 1775)
- Catocala lesbia Christoph, 1887
- Catocala nymphaea (Esper, [1787])
- Catocala nymphagoga (Esper, [1787])
- Catocala olgaorlovae Kravchenko et al., 2008
- Catocala puerpera (Giorna, 1791)
- Catocala separata (Freyer, 1848)
- Cerocala sana Staudinger, 1901
- Clytie arenosa Rothschild, 1913
- Clytie delunaris (Staudinger, 1889)
- Clytie haifae (Habich, 1905)
- Clytie illunaris (Hübner, [1813])
- Clytie infrequens (C. Swinhoe, 1884)
- Clytie sancta (Staudinger, 1898)
- Clytie scotorrhiza Hampson, 1913
- Clytie syriaca (Bugnion, 1837)
- Clytie terrulenta (Christoph, 1893)
- Crypsotidia maculifera (Staudinger, 1898)
- Drasteria cailino (Lefèbvre, 1827)
- Drasteria flexuosa (Ménétries, 1847)
- Drasteria herzi (Alphéraky, 1895)
- Drasteria kabylaria (A. Bang-Haas, 1906)
- Drasteria oranensis Rothschild, 1920
- Dysgonia algira (Linnaeus, 1767)
- Dysgonia rogenhoferi (Bohatsch, 1880)
- Dysgonia torrida (Guenée, 1852)
- Epharmottomena eremophila (Rebel, 1895)
- Exophyla rectangularis (Geyer, [1828])
- Gnamptonyx innexa (Walker, 1858)
- Grammodes bifasciata (Petagna, 1788)
- Heteropalpia acrosticta (Püngeler, 1904)
- Heteropalpia profesta (Christoph, 1887)
- Iranada turcorum (Zerny, 1915)
- Lygephila craccae (Denis & Schiffermüller, 1775)
- Lygephila lusoria (Linnaeus, 1758)
- Minucia lunaris (Denis & Schiffermüller, 1775)
- Minucia wiskotti (Püngeler, 1902)
- Ophiusa tirhaca (Cramer, 1777)
- Pandesma robusta (Walker, 1858)
- Pericyma albidentaria (Freyer, 1842)
- Pericyma squalens Lederer, 1855
- Plecoptera inquinata (Lederer, 1857)
- Plecoptera reflexa Guenée, 1852
- Prodotis boisdeffrii (Oberthür, 1867)
- Prodotis stolida (Fabricius, 1775)
- Rhabdophera arefacta (C. Swinhoe, 1884)
- Scodionyx mysticus Staudinger, 1900
- Scoliopteryx libatrix (Linnaeus, 1758)
- Tarachephia hueberi (Ershov, 1874)
- Tathorhynchus exsiccata (Lederer, 1855)
- Tyta luctuosa (Denis & Schiffermüller, 1775)
- Tytroca dispar (Püngeler, 1904)
- Tytroca leucoptera (Hampson, 1896)
- Ulotrichopus tinctipennis stertzi (Püngeler, 1907)
- Zethes insularis Rambur, 1833

== Subfamily Condicinae ==
- Condica capensis (Guenée, 1852)
- Condica viscosa (Freyer, 1831)
- Condica palaestinensis (Staudinger, 1895)

== Subfamily Cuculliinae ==
- Brachygalea albolineata (Blachier, 1905)
- Brachygalea kalchbergi (Staudinger, 1892)
- Lithophasia quadrivirgula (Mabille, 1888)
- Lithophasia venosula Staudinger, 1892
- Metlaouia autumna (Chrétien, 1910)
- Cucullia syrtana (Mabille, 1888)
- Cucullia argentina (Fabricius, 1787)
- Cucullia santolinae Rambur, 1834
- Cucullia calendulae Treitschke, 1835
- Cucullia santonici (Hübner, [1813])
- Cucullia boryphora Fischer de Waldheim, 1840
- Cucullia improba Christoph, 1885
- Cucullia macara Rebel, 1948
- Shargacucullia blattariae (Esper, 1790)
- Shargacucullia barthae (Boursin, 1933)
- Shargacucullia lychnitis (Rambur, 1833)
- Shargacucullia anceps (Staudinger, 1882)
- Shargacucullia strigicosta (Boursin, 1940)
- Shargacucullia macewani (Wiltshire, 1949)
- Shargacucullia verbasci (Linnaeus, 1758)
- Calocucullia celsiae (Herrich-Schäffer, 1850)
- Metalopha gloriosa (Staudinger, 1892)
- Metalopha liturata (Christoph, 1887)
- Calophasia platyptera (Esper, [1788])
- Calophasia barthae Wagner, 1929
- Calophasia angularis (Chrétien, 1911)
- Calophasia sinaica (Wiltshire, 1948)
- Pamparama acuta (Freyer, 1838)
- Cleonymia jubata (Oberthür, 1890)
- Cleonymia warionis (Oberthür, 1876)
- Cleonymia opposita (Lederer, 1870)
- Cleonymia pectinicornis (Staudinger, 1859)
- Cleonymia baetica (Rambur, 1837)
- Cleonymia chabordis (Oberthür, 1876)
- Cleonymia fatima (Bang-Haas, 1907)
- Teinoptera culminifera Calberla, 1891
- Teinoptera gafsana (Blachier, 1905)
- Omphalophana antirrhinii (Hübner, [1803])
- Omphalophana anatolica (Lederer, 1857)
- Omphalophana pauli (Staudinger, 1892)
- Recophora beata (Staudinger, 1892)
- Metopoceras omar (Oberthür, 1887)
- Metopoceras delicata (Staudinger, 1898)
- Metopoceras philbyi Wiltshire, 1980
- Metopoceras solituda (Brandt, 1938)
- Metopoceras kneuckeri (Rebel, 1903)
- Metopoceras felicina (Donzel, 1844)
- Rhabinopteryx subtilis (Mabille, 1888)
- Oncocnemis confusa persica persica Ebert, 1878
- Oncocnemis exacta Christoph, 1887
- Oncocnemis strioligera Lederer, 1853
- Xylocampa mustapha Oberthür, 1920
- Stilbia syriaca Staudinger, 1892
- Stilbina hypaenides Staudinger, 1892
- Hypeuthina fulgurita Lederer, 1855

== Subfamily Eriopinae ==
- Callopistria latreillei (Duponchel, 1827)

== Subfamily Eublemminae ==
- Calymma communimacula ([Denis & Schiffermüller], 1775)
- Eublemma albina (Staudinger, 1898)
- Eublemma albivestalis Hampson, 1910
- Eublemma apicipunctalis (Brandt, 1939)
- Eublemma cynerea (Turati, 1924)
- Eublemma cochylioides (Guenée, 1852)
- Eublemma cornutus Fibiger & Hacker, 2004
- Eublemma deserti Rothschild, 1909
- Eublemma gayneri (Rothschild, 1901)
- Eublemma gratissima (Staudinger, 1892)
- Eublemma hansa (Herrich-Schäffer, 1851)
- Eublemma kruegeri (Wiltshire, 1970)
- Eublemma ostrina (Hübner, 1808)
- Eublemma pallidula (Herrich-Schäffer, 1856)
- Eublemma parva (Hübner, 1808)
- Eublemma polygramma (Duponchel, 1836)
- Eublemma scitula (Rambur, 1833)
- Eublemma siticulosa (Lederer, 1858)
- Eublemma subvenata (Staudinger, 1892)
- Eublemma suppura (Staudinger, 1892)
- Eublemma tomentalis Rebel, 1947
- Honeyana ragusana (Freyer, 1844)
- Rhypagla lacernaria (Hübner, 1813)
- Metachrostis dardouini (Boisduval, 1840)
- Metachrostis velox (Hübner, 1813)
- Metachrostis velocior Staudinger, 1892

== Subfamily Eustrotiinae ==
- Eulocastra diaphora (Staudinger, 1879)

== Subfamily Euteliinae ==
- Eutelia adulatrix (Hübner, 1813)
- Eutelia adoratrix (Staudinger, 1892)

== Subfamily Hadeninae ==
- Orthosia cruda Denis & Schiffermüller, 1775
- Orthosia cypriaca Hacker, 1996
- Orthosia cerasi (Fabricius, 1775)
- Perigrapha mundoides (Boursin, 1940)
- Egira tibori Hreblay, 1994
- Tholera hilaris (Staudinger, 1901)
- Anarta sabulorum (Alphéraky, 1882)
- Anarta engedina Hacker, 1998
- Anarta arenbergeri (Pinker, 1974)
- Anarta mendax (Staudinger, 1879)
- Anarta mendica (Staudinger, 1879)
- Anarta trifolii (Hufnagel, 1766)
- Anarta stigmosa (Christoph, 1887)
- Cardepia sociabilis (Graslin, 1850)
- Cardepia affinis Rothschild, 1913
- Thargelia gigantea Rebel, 1909
- Odontelia daphnadeparisae Kravchenko, Ronkay, Speidel, Mooser & Müller, 2007
- Lacanobia oleracea (Linnaeus, 1758)
- Lacanobia softa (Staudinger, 1898)
- Sideridis implexa (Hübner, 1813)
- Dicerogastra chersotoides (Wiltshire, 1956)
- Saragossa siccanorum (Staudinger, 1870)
- Hecatera bicolorata (Hufnagel, 1766)
- Hecatera weissi (Boursin, 1952)
- Hecatera dysodea (Denis & Schiffermüller, 1775)
- Hecatera cappa (Hübner, 1809)
- Hecatera fixseni (Christoph, 1883)
- Enterpia laudeti (Boisduval, 1840)
- Hadena magnolii (Boisduval, 1829)
- Hadena compta ([Denis & Schiffermüller], 1775)
- Hadena adriana (Schawerda, 1921)
- Hadena gueneei (Staudinger, 1901)
- Hadena clara (Staudinger, 1901)
- Hadena persimilis Hacker, 1996
- Hadena drenowskii (Rebel, 1930)
- Hadena syriaca (Osthelder, 1933)
- Hadena perplexa ([Denis & Schiffermüller], 1775)
- Hadena silenes (Hübner, 1822)
- Hadena sancta (Staudinger, 1859)
- Hadena pumila (Staudinger, 1879)
- Hadena silenides (Staudinger, 1895)
- Mythimna ferrago (Fabricius, 1787)
- Mythimna vitellina (Hübner, 1808)
- Mythimna straminea (Treitschke, 1825)
- Mythimna congrua (Hübner, 1817)
- Mythimna languida (Walker, 1858)
- Mythimna l-album (Linnaeus, 1767)
- Mythimna sicula (Treitschke, 1835)
- Mythimna alopecuri (Boisduval, 1840)
- Mythimna riparia (Rambur, 1829)
- Mythimna unipuncta (Haworth, 1809)
- Leucania putrescens (Hübner, 1824)
- Leucania punctosa (Treitschke, 1825)
- Leucania herrichii Herrich-Schäffer, 1849
- Leucania palaestinae Staudinger, 1897
- Leucania joannisi Boursin & sporten, 1952
- Leucania zeae (Duponchel, 1827)
- Leucania loreyi (Duponchel, 1827)
- Polytela cliens (Felder & Rogenhofer, 1874)

== Subfamily Heliothinae ==
- Chazaria incarnata (Freyer, 1838)
- Heliothis viriplaca (Hufnagel, 1766)
- Heliothis nubigera (Herrich-Schäffer, 1851)
- Heliothis peltigera ([Denis & Schiffermüller], 1775)
- Helicoverpa armigera (Hübner, [1808])
- Schinia scutosa ([Denis & Schiffermüller], 1775)
- Periphanes delphinii (Linnaeus, 1758)
- Pyrrhia treitschkei (Frivaldsky, 1835)
- Aedophron phlebophora (Lederer, 1858)
- Masalia albida (Hampson, 1905)

== Subfamily Hypeninae ==
- Nodaria nodosalis (Herrich-Schäffer, [1851])
- Polypogon lunalis (Scopoli, 1763)
- Polypogon plumigeralis (Hübner, [1825])
- Hypena obsitalis (Hübner, [1813])
- Hypena lividalis (Hübner, 1796)
- Hypena munitalis Mann, 1861
- Zekelita antiqualis (Hübner, [1809])
- Zekelita ravalis (Herrich-Schäffer, 1851)

== Subfamily Hypenodinae ==
- Schrankia costaestrigalis (Stephens 1834)
- Schrankia taenialis (Hübner, [1809])

== Subfamily Metoponiinae ==
- Aegle semicana (Esper, 1798)
- Aegle rebeli Schawerda, 1923
- Aegle exquisita Boursin, 1969
- Aegle ottoi (Schawerda, 1923)
- Megalodes eximia (Freyer, 1845)
- Haemerosia renalis (Hübner, 1813)
- Haemerosia vassilininei A. Bang-Haas, 1912
- Tyta luctuosa [Denis & Schiffermüller, 1775]
- Epharmottomena eremophila (Rebel, 1895)
- Iranada turcorum (Zerny, 1915)

== Subfamily Noctuinae ==
- Euxoa anarmodia (Staudinger, 1897)
- Euxoa aquilina (Denis & Schiffermüller, 1775)
- Euxoa cos (Hübner, [1824])
- Euxoa canariensis (Rebel, 1902)
- Euxoa conspicua (Hübner, [1827])
- Euxoa distinguenda (Lederer, 1857)
- Euxoa foeda (Lederer, 1855)
- Euxoa heringi (Staudinger, 1877)
- Euxoa nigrofusca (Esper, [1788])
- Euxoa oranaria (Bang-Haas, 1906)
- Euxoa robiginosa (Staudinger, 1895)
- Euxoa temera (Hübner, [1808])
- Agrotis spinifera (Hübner, [1808])
- Agrotis segetum ([Denis & Schiffermüller], 1775)
- Agrotis trux (Hübner, [1824])
- Agrotis exclamationis (Linnaeus, 1758)
- Agrotis scruposa (Draudt, 1936)
- Agrotis alexandriensis Bethune-Baker, 1894
- Agrotis herzogi Rebel, 1911
- Agrotis haifae Staudinger, 1897
- Agrotis sardzeana Brandt, 1941
- Agrotis ipsilon (Hüfnagel, 1766)
- Agrotis puta (Hübner, [1803])
- Agrotis syricola Corti & Draudt, 1933
- Agrotis bigramma (Esper, [1790])
- Agrotis obesa (Boisduval, 1829)
- Agrotis pierreti (Bugnion, 1837)
- Agrotis psammocharis Boursin, 1950
- Agrotis lasserrei (Oberthür, 1881)
- Agrotis boetica (Boisduval, [1837])
- Agrotis margelanoides (Boursin, 1944)
- Pachyagrotis tischendorfi (Püngeler, 1925)
- Dichagyris rubidior (Corti, 1933)
- Dichagyris terminicincta (Corti, 1933)
- Dichagyris candelisequa ([Denis & Schiffermüller], 1775)
- Dichagyris elbursica (Draudt, 1937)
- Dichagyris leucomelas Brandt, 1941
- Dichagyris melanuroides Kozhantshikov, 1930
- Dichagyris melanura (Kollar, 1846)
- Dichagyris imperator (Bang-Haas, 1912)
- Dichagyris pfeifferi (Corti & Draudt, 1933)
- Dichagyris singularis (Staudinger, 1892)
- Dichagyris erubescens (Staudinger, 1892)
- Dichagyris devota (Christoph, 1884)
- Dichagyris amoena Staudinger, 1892
- Dichagyris anastasia (Draudt, 1936)
- Yigoga romanovi (Christoph, 1885)
- Yigoga flavina (Herrich-Schäffer, 1852)
- Yigoga nigrescens (Höfner, 1887)
- Yigoga libanicola (Corti & Draudt, 1933)
- Yigoga truculenta Lederer, 1853
- Stenosomides sureyae facunda (Draudt, 1938)
- Standfussiana defessa (Lederer, 1858)
- Rhyacia arenacea (Hampson, 1907)
- Chersotis ebertorum Koçak, 1980
- Chersotis elegans (Eversmann, 1837)
- Chersotis multangula (Hübner, [1803])
- Chersotis capnistis (Lederer, 1872)
- Chersotis margaritacea (Villers, 1789)
- Chersotis fimbriola (Esper, [1803])
- Chersotis laeta (Rebel, 1904)
- Ochropleura leucogaster (Freyer, 1831)
- Basistriga flammatra (Denis & Schiffermüller], 1775)
- Noctua orbona (Hufnagel, 1766)
- Noctua pronuba (Linnaeus, 1758)
- Noctua comes Hübner, [1813]
- Noctua janthina ([Denis & Schiffermüller], 1775)
- Noctua tertia Mentzer, Moberg & Fibiger, 1991
- Noctua tirrenica (Biebinger, Speidel & Hanigk, 1983)
- Noctua interjecta Hübner, [1803]
- Epilecta linogrisea ([Denis & Schiffermüller], 1775)
- Peridroma saucia (Hübner, [1808])
- Eugnorisma pontica (Staudinger, 1892)
- Xestia sareptana (Herrich-Schäffer, 1851)
- Xestia castanea (Esper, [1798])
- Xestia cohaesa (Herrich-Schäffer, [1849])
- Xestia xanthographa ([Denis & Schiffermüller], 1775)
- Xestia palaestinensis (Kalchberg, 1897)

== Subfamily Phytometrinae ==
- Raparna conicephala (Staudinger, 1870)
- Antarchaea erubescens (A. Bang-Haas, 1910)

== Subfamily Plusiinae ==
- Abrostola clarissa (Staudinger, 1900)
- Agrapha accentifera (Lefebvre, 1827)
- Autographa gamma (Linnaeus, 1758)
- Chrysodeixis chalcites (Esper, [1789])
- Cornutiplusia circumflexa (Linnaeus, 1767)
- Euchalcia augusta (Staudinger, 1891)
- Euchalcia emichi (Rogenhofer, 1873)
- Euchalcia aureolineata Ronkay & Gyulai, 1997
- Euchalcia augusta (Staudinger, 1891)
- Euchalcia maria (Staudinger, 1892)
- Euchalcia olga Kravchenko, Müller, Fibiger & Ronkay, 2006
- Euchalcia paulina (Staudinger, 1892)
- Macdunnoughia confusa (Stephens, 1850)
- Trichoplusia vittata (Wallengren, 1856)
- Thysanoplusia daubei (Boisduval, 1840)
- Thysanoplusia orichalcea (Fabricius, 1775)
- Trichoplusia ni (Hübner, [1803])
- Trichoplusia circumscripta (Freyer, 1831)

== Subfamily Psaphidinae ==
- Valeria oleagina (Denis and & Schiffermüller, 1775)
- Valeria josefmooseri Kravchenko, Speidel & Muller, 2006
- Valeria thomaswitti Kravchenko, Muller & Speidel 2006
- Allophyes benedictina (Staudinger, 1892)
- Allophyes asiatica (Staudinger, 1892)

== Subfamily Rivulinae ==
- Rivula tanitalis Rebel, 1912
- Zebeeba falsalis (Herrich-Schäffer, 1839)

== Subfamily Xyleninae ==
- Spodoptera exigua (Hübner, 1808)
- Spodoptera cilium (Guenée, 1852)
- Spodoptera littoralis (Boisduval, 1833)
- Caradrina agrotina (Staudinger, 1892)
- Caradrina aspersa (Rambur, 1834)
- Caradrina kadenii (Freyer, 1836)
- Caradrina syriaca (Staudinger, 1892)
- Caradrina panurgia (Boursin, 1939)
- Caradrina oberthueri (Rothschild, 1913)
- Caradrina ingrata (Staudinger, 1897)
- Caradrina flavirena (Guenée, 1852)
- Caradrina scotoptera (Püngeler, 1914)
- Caradrina hypostigma (Boursin, 1932)
- Caradrina amseli (Boursin, 1936)
- Caradrina clavipalpis (Scopoli, 1763)
- Caradrina selini Boisduval, 1840
- Caradrina levantina Hacker, 2004
- Caradrina zandi (Wiltshire, 1952)
- Caradrina fibigeri Hacker, 2004
- Caradrina atriluna (Guenée, 1852)
- Caradrina zernyi (Boursin, 1936)
- Caradrina flava (Oberthür, 1876)
- Caradrina casearia (Staudinger, 1900)
- Caradrina kravchenkoi Hacker, 2004
- Caradrina vicina (Staudinger, 1870)
- Caradrina alfierii (Boursin, 1937)
- Caradrina melanurina (Staudinger, 1901)
- Caradrina bodenheimeri (Draudt, 1934)
- Hoplodrina ambigua [Denis & Schiffermüller, 1775]
- Scythocentropus eberti Hacker, 2001
- Scythocentropus inquinata (Mabille, 1888)
- Diadochia stigmatica Wiltshire, 1984
- Heterographa puengeleri Bartel, 1904
- Catamecia minima (C. Swinhoe, 1889)
- Dicycla oo (Linnaeus, 1758)
- Atethmia ambusta [Denis & Schiffermüller, 1775]
- Atethmia centrago (Haworth, 1809)
- Eremotrachea bacheri (Püngeler, 1902)
- Anthracia eriopoda (Herrich-Schäffer, 1851)
- Mormo maura (Linnaeus, 1758)
- Polyphaenis propinqua (Staudinger, 1898)
- Olivenebula subsericata Herrich-Schäffer, 1861
- Chloantha hyperici [Denis & Schiffermüller, 1775]
- Phlogophora meticulosa (Linnaeus, 1758)
- Pseudenargia regina (Staudinger, 1892)
- Pseudenargia deleta (Osthelder, 1933)
- Apamea monoglypha (Hufnagel, 1766)
- Apamea syriaca (Osthelder, 1933)
- Apamea polyglypha (Staudinger, 1892)
- Apamea leucodon (Eversmann, 1837)
- Apamea platinea (Herrich-Schäffer, 1852)
- Apamea anceps [Denis & Schiffermüller, 1775]
- Mesoligia literosa (Haworth, 1809)
- Luperina dumerilii (Duponchel, 1826)
- Luperina kravchenkoi Fibiger & Müller, 2005
- Luperina rjabovi (Kljutschko, 1967)
- Margelana flavidior F. Wagner, 1931
- Gortyna gyulaii Fibiger & Zahiri, 2006
- Oria musculosa (Hübner, 1809)
- Monagria typhae (Thunberg, 1784)
- Lenisa geminipuncta (Haworth, 1809)
- Lenisa wiltshirei (Bytinski-Salz, 1936)
- Arenostola deserticola (Staudinger, 1900)
- Sesamia ilonae Hacker, 2001
- Sesamia cretica Lederer, 1857
- Sesamia nonagrioides (Lefèbvre, 1827)
- Episema tamardayanae Fibiger, Kravchenko, Mooser, Li & Müller, 2006
- Episema lederi Christoph, 1885
- Episema didymogramma (Boursin, 1955)
- Episema ulriki Fibiger, Kravchenko & Müller, 2006
- Episema korsakovi (Christoph, 1885)
- Episema lemoniopsis Hacker, 2001
- Leucochlaena muscosa (Staudinger, 1892)
- Leucochlaena jordana Draudt, 1934
- Ulochlaena hirta (Hübner, 1813)
- Ulochlaena gemmifera Hacker 2001
- Eremopola lenis (Staudinger, 1892)
- Tiliacea cypreago (Hampson, 1906)
- Xanthia pontica Kljutshko, 1968
- Maraschia grisescens Osthelder, 1933
- Agrochola litura (Linnaeus, 1761)
- Agrochola rupicarpa (Staudinger, 1879)
- Agrochola osthelderi Boursin, 1951
- Agrochola macilenta (Hübner, 1809)
- Agrochola helvola (Linnaeus, 1758)
- Agrochola pauli (Staudinger, 1892)
- Agrochola scabra (Staudinger, 1892)
- Agrochola hypotaenia (Bytinsky-Salz, 1936)
- Agrochola lychnidis [Denis & Schiffermüller, 1775]
- Agrochola staudingeri Ronkay, 1984
- Conistra acutula (Staudinger, 1892)
- Conistra veronicae (Hübner, 1813)
- Jodia croceago [Denis & Schiffermüller, 1775]
- Lithophane semibrunnea (Haworth, 1809)
- Lithophane lapidea (Hübner, 1808)
- Lithophane ledereri (Staudinger, 1892)
- Xylena exsoleta (Linnaeus, 1758)
- Xylena vetusta (Hübner, 1813)
- Evisa schawerdae Reisser, 1930
- Rileyiana fovea (Treitschke, 1825)
- Dryobota labecula (Esper, 1788)
- Scotochrosta pulla [Denis & Schiffermüller, 1775]
- Dichonia pinkeri (Kobes, 1973)
- Dichonia aeruginea (Hübner, 1808)
- Dryobotodes eremita (Fabricius, 1775)
- Dryobotodes carbonis (F. Wagner, 1931)
- Dryobotodes tenebrosa (Esper, 1789)
- Pseudohadena eibinevoi Fibiger, Kravchenko & Muller, 2006
- Pseudohadena jordana (Staudinger, 1900)
- Pseudohadena commoda (Staudinger, 1889)
- Antitype jonis (Lederer, 1865)
- Ammoconia senex (Geyer, 1828)
- Aporophyla canescens (Duponchel, 1826)
- Aporophyla nigra (Haworth, 1809)
- Aporophyla australis (Boisduval, 1829)
- Aporophyla dipsalea Wiltshire, 1941
- Dasypolia ferdinandi Rühl, 1892
- Polymixis manisadjiani (Staudinger, 1882)
- Polymixis subvenusta (Püngeler, 1906)
- Polymixis juditha (Staudinger, 1898)
- Polymixis rebecca (Staudinger, 1892)
- Polymixis steinhardti Kravchenko, Fibiger, Mooser & Müller, 2005
- Polymixis ancepsoides Poole, 1989
- Polymixis rufocincta (Geyer, 1828)
- Polymixis trisignata (Ménétriès, 1847)
- Polymixis serpentina (Treitschke, 1825)
- Polymixis apora (Staudinger, 1898)
- Polymixis lea (Staudinger, 1898)
- Polymixis aegyptiaca (Wiltshire, 1947)
- Polymixis epiphleps (Turati & Krüger, 1936)
- Mniotype compitalis (Draudt, 1909)
- Mniotype judaica (Staudinger, 1898)
- Mniotype johanna (Staudinger, 1898)
- Boursinia discordans (Boursin, 1940)
- Boursinia deceptrix (Staudinger, 1900)
- Boursinia lithoxylea (A. Bang-Haas, 1912)
- Wiltshireola praecipua Hacker & Kravchenko, 2001
- Ostheldera gracilis (Osthelder, 1933)
- Metopoplus excelsa (Christoph, 1885)

== See also ==
- Noctuidae
- Moths
- Lepidoptera
- List of moths of Israel
