= List of butterflies of Israel =

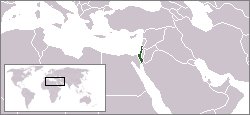
Location of Israel

This is a complete list of butterfly taxa that occur or have occurred in the wild, within the current boundaries of the State of Israel, the Palestinian territories and the Golan Heights.

== Hesperiidae ==
Scientific name	Hebrew name	image
Borbo borbonica zelleri Lederer, 1855	הֶסְפֵּרִית בִּצּוֹת	
Carcharodus alceae alceae Esper, 1780	אפורית הַחֶלְמִית	
Carcharodus orientalis maccabaeus Hemming, 1932	אפורית הַמַּכַּבִּים	
Carcharodus stauderi ambigua Verity, 1925	אֲפֹרִית הַגַּלּוֹנִית	
Erynnis marloyi marloyi Boisduval, 1834	אפורית אַפְלוּלִית	
Gegenes nostrodamus Fabricius, 1793	הֶסְפֵּרִית עֵשֶׂב	
Gegenes pumilio Mabille, 1878	הֶסְפֵּרִית שְׁחֹרָה	
Gomalia elma levana Benyamini, 1990	אפורית הָאַבּוּטִילוֹן	
Hesperia comma pallida Staudinger, 1901	נְחוּשָׁה לִבְנַת-כְּתָמִים	
Muschampia proteides hieromax Hemming, 1932	אפורית הַשַּׁלְהָבִית	
Muschampia proteides lycaonius Wagner, 1929	אפורית חלודית	
Muschampia proteides stepporum Benyamini & Avni, 2001	אפורית ערבתית	
Muschampia tessellum nomas Lederer, 1855	אפורית מַלְבִּינָה	
Pelopidas thrax thrax Hübner, 1821	הֶסְפֵּרִית הַדֹּחַן	
Pyrgus melotis melotis Duponchel, 1832	אפורית מִזְרָחִית	
Pyrgus serratulae alveoides Staudinger, 1901	אֲפֹרִית הַחַמְשָׁן	
Spialia doris doris Walker, 1870	נִקְדִּית הַחֲבַלְבַּל	
Spialia orbifer hilaris Staudinger, 1901	נִקְדִּית הַוַּרְדִּיִּים	
Spialia phlomidis hermona Evans, 1956	נִקְדִּית הַחֶרְמוֹן	
Thymelicus acteon phoenix Graves, 1925	נְחוּשַׁת הַשְּׂעוֹרָה	
Thymelicus hyrax hyrax Lederer, 1861	נְחוּשָׁה נָאָה	
Thymelicus lineola fornax Hemming, 1934	נְחוּשַׁת הַחִיטָּה	
Thymelicus sylvestris syriaca Tutt, 1905	נְחוּשַׁת הַנַּשְׁרָן	

== Lycaenidae ==
Scientific name	Hebrew name	image
Anthene amarah amarah Guerin, 1849	כחליל אילת	
Aricia agestis agestis Denis & schiffermuler, 1775	כחליל הגרניון	
Aricia bassoni Larsen, 1974	כחליל ארמני	
Aricia isaurica dorsum-stellae Graves, 1923	כחליל חיוור	
Azanus jesous gamra Guerin, 1849	כחליל הינבוט	
Azanus ubaldus Cramer, 1782	כחליל השיטה	
Cacyreus marshalli Butler, 1897	כחליל הפלרגון	
Callophrys paulae paulae Pfeiffer, 1932	כחליל פאולה	
Callophrys rubi intermedia Tutt, 1907	כחליל ירוק	
Celastrina argiolus paraleuca Rober, 1897	כחליל הקיסוס	
Cigaritis acamas acamas (Klug, 1834)	כחליל מנומר	
Cigaritis acamas egyptiaca (Riley, 1925)	כחליל מנומר מצרי	
Cigaritis cilissa Lederer, 1861	כחליל הגליל	
Cyaniris bellis antiochena Lederer, 1861	כחליל אנטיוכיה	
Deudorix livia Klug, 1834	כחליל הרימון	
Freyeria trochylus trochylus Freyer, 1845	כחליל מקושט	
Glaucopsyche alexis Poda, 1761	כחליל הדבשה	
Iolana alfierii Wiltshire, 1948	כחליל הקרקש	
Iolaus glaucus Butler, 1885	כחליל ההרנוג	
Kretania eurypilus euaemon (Hemming, 1931)	כחליל הכרבולת	
Kretania nicholli (Elwes, 1901)	כחליל ניקול	
Kretania philbyi (Graves, 1925)	כחליל צפרירי	
Kretania pylaon cleopatra (Hemming, 1934)	כחליל קליאופטרה	
Lampides boeticus Linnaeus, 1767	כחליל האפון	
Leptotes pirithous Linnaeus, 1767	כחליל האספסת	
Luthrodes galba (Lederer, 1855)	כחליל הקטנית	
Lycaena asabinus asabinus (Herrich-Schäffer, 1851)	כחליל מזרחי	
Lycaena ochimus ochimus (Herrich-Schäffer, 1851)	כחליל זהוב	
Lycaena phlaeas timeus (Cramer, [1777])	כחליל הארכובית	
Lycaena thersamon omphale Klug, 1834	כחליל החומעה	
Plebejidea loewii uranicola (Walker, 1870)	כחליל המדבר	
Polyommatus alcestis alcestis (Zerny, 1932)	כחליל שעיר	
Polyommatus anthea Hemming, 1932	כחליל הבקיה	
Polyommatus icarus zelleri Verity, 1919	כחליל השברק	
Polyommatus juno Hemming, 1933	כחליל החרמון	
Polyommatus isauricoides isauriciodes Graves, 1923	כחליל הפסגה	
Pseudophilotes abencerragus nabataeus Graves, 1925	כחליל נבטי	
Pseudophilotes vicrama astabene Hemming, 1932	כחליל האזוב	
Quercusia quercus longicauda Riley, 1921	כחליל סגול	
Satyrium abdominalis persica Riley, 1939	כחליל פרסי	
Satyrium ilicis (Esper, 1779)	כחליל האלון	
Satyrium myrtale myrtale Klug, 1832	כחליל הדובדבן	
Satyrium spini melantho Klug, 1832	כחליל האשחר	
Tarucus balkanicus Freyer, 1845	כחליל הבלקן	
Tarucus rosaceus Austaut, 1885	כחליל השיזף	
Tomares nesimachus Oberthur, 1893	כחליל הקדד	
Turanana endymion Freyer, 1850	כחליל נקוד	
Zizeeria karsandra Moore, 1865	כחליל הקוטב	

== Nymphalidae ==
Scientific name	Hebrew name	image
Aglais urticae turcica Staudinger, 1901	נימפית החרמון	
Argynnis pandora pandora Denis & Schiffermüller, 1775	נימפית פנדורה	
Charaxes jasius jasius Linnaeus, 1767	נימפית הקטלב	
Chazara persephone transiens Zerny, 1932	סטירית הפסים	
Danaus chrysippus chrysippus Linnaeus, 1758	דנאית תפוח-סדום, דנאית הדורה	
Fabriciana niobe philistra Seitz, 1901	נימפית הסגל	
Hipparchia fatua sichaea Lederer, 1857	סטירית עמומה	
Hipparchia pisidice Klug, 1832	סטירית סיני	
Hypolimnas misippus Linnaeus, 1767	נימפית הרגלה	
Hyponephele lupinus centralis Riley, 1921	סטירית סומית	
Hyponephele lycaon libanotica Staudinger, 1901	סטירית החרמון	
Issoria lathonia lathonia Linnaeus, 1758	נימפית הפנינים	
Kirinia roxelana Cramer, 1777	סטירית אנטולית	
Lasiommata maera orientalis Heyne, 1894	סטירית היבלית	
Lasiommata megera emilyssa Verity, 1919	סטירית הציבורת	
Limenitis reducta schiffermuelleri Higgins, 1933	אצילית היערה	
Maniola telmessia telmessia Zeller, 1847	סטירית פקוחה	
Melanargia titea titania Calberla, 1891	סטירית משוישת	
Melitaea arduinna evanescens Staudinger, 1886	נימפית הקוציץ	
Melitaea cinxia clarissa Staudinger, 1901	נימפית הברוניקה	
Melitaea collina collina Lederer, 1861	נימפית צפונית	
Melitaea deserticola macromaculata Belter, 1934	נימפית המדבר	
Melitaea didyma libanotica Belter, 1934	נימפית הלבנון	
Melitaea telona Fruhstorfer, 1908	נימפית ירושלים	
Melitaea acentria Lukhtanov, 2017 (see former Melitaea persea montium Belter, 1934)	כיתמית החרמון	
Melitaea trivia syriaca Rebel, 1905	נימפית הבוצין	
Nymphalis polychloros polychloros Linnaeus, 1758	נימפית מגוונת	
Pararge aegeria aegeria Linnaeus, 1758	סטירית מנומרת	
Polygonia c-album c-album Linnaeus, 1758	נימפית טוביה, נימפית הפסיק	
Polygonia egea egea Cramer, 1775	נימפית משוננת	
Pseudochazara mamura larseni Kocak, 1978	סטירית טורקית	
Pseudochazara pelopea pelopea Klug, 1832	סטירית הלבנון	
Pseudochazara telephassa Hübner, 1806	סטירית המערות	
Satyrus ferula makmal Higgins, 1965	סטירית ההרים	
Vanessa atalanta atalanta Linnaeus, 1758	נימפית הסרפד	
Vanessa cardui cardui Linnaeus, 1758	נימפית החורשף	
Ypthima asterope Klug, 1832	סטירית הטבעת	

== Papilionidae ==
Scientific name	Hebrew name	image
Allancastria cerisyi speciosa Stichel, 1907	צבעוני קשוט	
Allancastria deyrollei eisneri Bernardi, 1971	צבעוני צהוב	
Archon apollinus bellargus (Staudinger, 1892)	צבעוני שקוף	
Iphiclides podalirius virgatus Butler,1865	זנב-סנונית הורדניים	
Papilio alexanor maccabaeus Staudinger, 1889	זנב-סנונית המכבים	
Papilio machaon syriacus Verity, 1905	זנב-סנונית נאה	
Papilio saharae saharae Oberthur, 1879	זנב-סנונית מדברי	
Parnassius mnemosyne syra Verity, 1908	צבעוני החרמון	

== Pieridae ==
Scientific name	Hebrew name	image
Anaphaeis aurota Fabricius, 1793	לבנין משויש	
Anthocharis cardamines phoenissa von Kalchberg, 1894	כתום-כנף המצילתיים	
Anthocharis damone syra Verity, 1911	כתום-כנף צהוב	
Anthocharis gruneri gruneri Herrich-Schäffer	כתום-כנף הדופרית	
Aporia crataegi augustior (Graves, 1925)	לבנין העוזרר	
Catopsilia florella Fabricius, 1775	לבנין הכאסיה	
Colias croceus Geoffroy, 1785	לבנין התלתן	
Colias libanotica libanotica Lederer, 1858	לבנין הלבנון	
Colotis chrysonome chrysonome Klug, 1829	לבנין המרואה	
Colotis fausta fausta Olivier, 1804	לבנין הצלף	
Colotis phisadia phisadia Goddart, 1819	לבנין הסלוודורה	
Euchloe aegyptiaca Verity, 1911	לבנין מצרי	
Euchloe ausonia (Hübner, 1804)	לבנין מזרחי	
Euchloe belemia belemia Esper, 1799	לבנין ירוק-פסים	
Euchloe charlonia charlonia Donzel, 1848	לבנין צהבהב	
Euchloe falloui falloui Allard, 1867	לבנין המוריקנדיה	
Euchloe penia Freyer, 1851	לבנין החורן	
Gonepteryx cleopatra taurica Staudinger, 1881	לימונית האשחר	
Gonepteryx farinosa farinosa Zeller, 1847	לימונית החרמון	
Gonepteryx rhamni meridionalis Rober, 1907	לימונית אירופית	
Pieris brassicae catoleuca Rober, 1896	לבנין הכרוב	
Pieris napi dubiosa Rober, 1907	לבנין מעורק	
Pieris rapae leucosoma Schawerda, 1905	לבנין הצנון	
Pontia daplidice daplidice Linnaeus, 1758	לבנין הרכפה	
Pontia glauconome Klug, 1829	לבנין הרכפתן	
Zegris eupheme uarda Hemming, 1929	לבנין מדברי	

== See also ==
- List of moths of Israel
