= A. maritima =

A. maritima may refer to:

- Abronia maritima, the red sand verbena, a beach-adapted perennial plant species
- Alnus maritima, the seaside alder, a plant species
- Anisolabis maritima, the maritime earwig or the seaside earwig, an earwig species
- Armeria maritima, a flowering plant species
- Anurida maritima, a cosmopolitan collembolan species of the intertidal zone
- Armada maritima, a moth species found in Saudi Arabia, Oman, the United Arab Emirates and Israel
- Artemisia maritima, the sea wormwood or old woman, a plant species

== See also ==
- Maritima (disambiguation)
