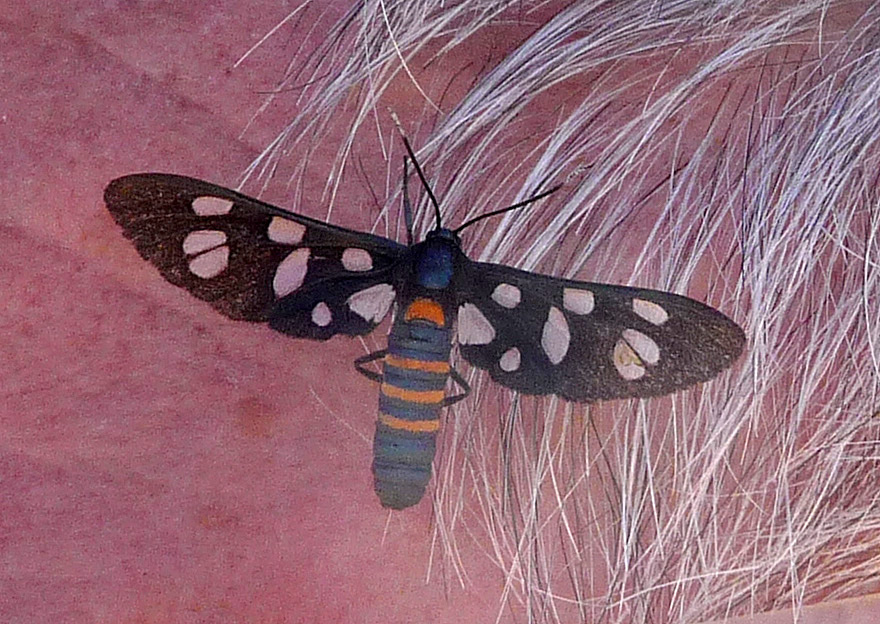

Scientific classification
- Domain: Eukaryota
- Kingdom: Animalia
- Phylum: Arthropoda
- Class: Insecta
- Order: Lepidoptera
- Superfamily: Noctuoidea
- Family: Erebidae
- Subfamily: Arctiinae
- Genus: Amata
- Species: A. mogadorensis

Binomial name
- Amata mogadorensis (Blachier, 1908)

Synonyms
- Syntomis mogadorensis Blachier, 1908

= Amata mogadorensis =

Species of moth

Amata mogadorensis is a species of moth of the family Erebidae first described by Charles Theodore Blachier in 1908. It is found in Morocco and Algeria.

The larvae have been recorded feeding on Sonchus acetosa, Plantago coronopus, Vitis vinifera and Populus nigra.
