= Iranada =

Scientific classification
- Kingdom: Animalia
- Phylum: Arthropoda
- Class: Insecta
- Order: Lepidoptera
- Superfamily: Noctuoidea
- Family: Noctuidae
- Subfamily: Acontiinae
- Genus: Iranada; Wiltshire, 1977

Genus of moths

Iranada is a genus of moths of the family Noctuidae. The genus was described by Wiltshire in 1977.

- Iranada tarachoides (Bytinski-Salz & Brandt, 1937)
- Iranada ornata (Brandt, 1939)
- Iranada venusta (Brandt, 1939)
- Iranada secunda (Ershov, 1874)
- Iranada turcorum (Zerny, 1915)
- Iranada versicolor (Brandt, 1939)
