= List of moths of Israel (microlepidoptera) =

This is a list of microlepidoptera that are found in Israel. It also acts as an index to the species articles and forms part of the full List of moths of Israel.

== Superfamily Yponomeutoidea ==
=== Family Yponomeutidae ===
- Kessleria saxifragae (Stainton, 1868)
- Prays oleae (Bernard, 1788)
- Prays citri Millière, 1873
- Yponomeuta albonigratus Gershenson, 1972
- Yponomeuta cagnagellus (Hübner, 1813)
- Yponomeuta meridionalis Gershenson, 1972

=== Family Plutellidae ===
- Plutella porrectella (Linnaeus, 1758)
- Plutella xylostella (Linnaeus, 1788)

=== Family Ypsolophidae ===
- Ypsolopha asperella (Linnaeus, 1761)
- Ypsolopha dentella (Fabricius, 1775)
- Ypsolopha eremellus Amsel, 1933
- Ypsolopha instabilella (Mann, 1866)
- Ypsolopha mucronella (Scopoli, 1763)
- Ypsolopha persicella (Fabricius, 1787)
- Ypsolopha sculpturella (Herrich-Schäffer, 1854)

== See also ==
- Microlepidoptera
- Moths
- Lepidoptera
- List of moths of Israel
