= Metalopha =

Scientific classification
- Domain: Eukaryota
- Kingdom: Animalia
- Phylum: Arthropoda
- Class: Insecta
- Order: Lepidoptera
- Superfamily: Noctuoidea
- Family: Noctuidae
- Subfamily: Cuculliinae
- Genus: Metalopha

Genus of moths

Metalopha is a genus of moths of the family Noctuidae.

== Selected species ==
- Metalopha gloriosa (Staudinger, 1892)
- Metalopha liturata (Christoph, 1887)
