= Africalpe nubifera =

Scientific classification
- Kingdom: Animalia
- Phylum: Arthropoda
- Clade: Pancrustacea
- Class: Insecta
- Order: Lepidoptera
- Superfamily: Noctuoidea
- Family: Erebidae
- Genus: Africalpe
- Species: A. nubifera

Binomial name
- Africalpe nubifera Hampson, 1907

Synonyms
- Calpe nubifera; Calyptra nubifera

Species of moth

Africalpe nubifera is a moth of the family Erebidae first described by George Hampson in 1907. It is found in India.
