= Lithophasia =

Scientific classification
- Domain: Eukaryota
- Kingdom: Animalia
- Phylum: Arthropoda
- Class: Insecta
- Order: Lepidoptera
- Superfamily: Noctuoidea
- Family: Noctuidae
- Subfamily: Cuculliinae
- Genus: Lithophasia

Genus of moths

Lithophasia is a genus of moths of the family Noctuidae.

== Selected species ==
- Lithophasia quadrivirgula (Mabille, 1888)
- Lithophasia venosula (Staudinger, 1892)
