= Africalpe =

Scientific classification
- Kingdom: Animalia
- Phylum: Arthropoda
- Clade: Pancrustacea
- Class: Insecta
- Order: Lepidoptera
- Superfamily: Noctuoidea
- Family: Erebidae
- Subfamily: Calpinae
- Tribe: Calpini
- Genus: Africalpe; Krüger, 1939

Genus of moths

Africalpe is a genus of moths in the family Erebidae.

== Species ==
- Africalpe intrusa Krüger, 1939
- Africalpe nubifera Hampson, 1907
- Africalpe vagabunda Swinhoe, 1884
