= Recophora =

Scientific classification
- Domain: Eukaryota
- Kingdom: Animalia
- Phylum: Arthropoda
- Class: Insecta
- Order: Lepidoptera
- Superfamily: Noctuoidea
- Family: Noctuidae
- Genus: Recophora; Nye, 1975

Synonyms
- Phorocera Guenée, 1852 (preocc.)

Genus of moths

Recophora is a genus of moths of the family Noctuidae. The genus was described by Nye in 1975.

"Recophora" may be a misspelling of "Recoropha"

== Species ==
- Recophora canteneri (Duponchel, 1833)
- Recophora beata (Staudinger, 1892)
- Recophora hreblayi Hacker & Ronkay, 2002

== Sources ==
- Genus info and images
