= Pachyagrotis =

Scientific classification
- Domain: Eukaryota
- Kingdom: Animalia
- Phylum: Arthropoda
- Class: Insecta
- Order: Lepidoptera
- Superfamily: Noctuoidea
- Family: Noctuidae
- Subfamily: Noctuinae
- Genus: Pachyagrotis; Boursin, 1953

Type species
- Pachyagrotis ankarensis (Rebel, 1931)

Genus of moths

Pachyagrotis is a genus of moths in the Noctuidae family, first described by Charles Boursin in 1953. The type species is Pachyagrotis ankarensis (Rebel, 1931).

== Species ==
Species accepted in the genus according to IRMNG are:

- Pachyagrotis ankarensis Rebel, 1933
- Pachyagrotis benigna Corti, 1926
- Pachyagrotis flagrans Püngeler, 1925
- Pachyagrotis libanotica Corti & Draudt, 1933
- Pachyagrotis tischendorfi (Püngeler, 1925)
- Pachyagrotis wichgrafi Corti & Draudt, 1933
