= Dicerogastra =

Scientific classification
- Domain: Eukaryota
- Kingdom: Animalia
- Phylum: Arthropoda
- Class: Insecta
- Order: Lepidoptera
- Superfamily: Noctuoidea
- Family: Noctuidae
- Genus: Dicerogastra

Genus of moths

Dicerogastra is a genus of moths of the family Noctuidae.

== Selected species ==
- Dicerogastra chersotoides (Wiltshire, 1956)
