= Africalpe vagabunda =

Scientific classification
- Kingdom: Animalia
- Phylum: Arthropoda
- Clade: Pancrustacea
- Class: Insecta
- Order: Lepidoptera
- Superfamily: Noctuoidea
- Family: Erebidae
- Genus: Africalpe
- Species: A. vagabunda

Binomial name
- Africalpe vagabunda C. Swinhoe, 1884

Synonyms
- Oraesia vagabunda; Pseudcalpe anubis; Africalpe anubia; Africalpe anubis

Species of moth

Africalpe vagabunda is a moth of the family Erebidae first described by Charles Swinhoe in 1884. It is found in Pakistan and Egypt.
