= Armada (moth) =

Scientific classification
- Domain: Eukaryota
- Kingdom: Animalia
- Phylum: Arthropoda
- Class: Insecta
- Order: Lepidoptera
- Superfamily: Noctuoidea
- Family: Noctuidae
- Subfamily: Acontiinae
- Tribe: Armadini
- Genus: Armada; Staudinger, 1884

Genus of moths

Armada is a genus of moths of the family Noctuidae. The genus was described by Staudinger in 1884.

== Species ==
- Armada barrygoateri Fibiger & Ronkay, 2003
- Armada clio Staudinger, 1884
- Armada dentata Staudinger, 1884
- Armada fletcheri Wiltshire, 1961
- Armada funesta Brandt, 1939
- Armada heliothidia Hampson, 1896
- Armada maritima Brandt, 1939
- Armada nilotica A. Bang-Haas 1912
- Armada panaceorum Menetries, 1848
- Armada philbyi Wiltshire, 1979
