= Epharmottomena =

Scientific classification
- Domain: Eukaryota
- Kingdom: Animalia
- Phylum: Arthropoda
- Class: Insecta
- Order: Lepidoptera
- Superfamily: Noctuoidea
- Family: Noctuidae
- Subfamily: Metoponiinae
- Genus: Epharmottomena; John, 1909

Genus of moths

Epharmottomena is a genus of moths of the family Noctuidae. The genus was erected by Oscar John in 1909.

== Species ==
- Epharmottomena albiluna Hampson, 1899
- Epharmottomena eremophila Rebel, 1895
- Epharmottomena gelida Brandt, 1939
- Epharmottomena gorgonula Wiltshire, 1979
- Epharmottomena nana Staudinger, 1884
- Epharmottomena tenera Brandt, 1939
