= Brachygalea albolineata =

Scientific classification
- Kingdom: Animalia
- Phylum: Arthropoda
- Class: Insecta
- Order: Lepidoptera
- Superfamily: Noctuoidea
- Family: Noctuidae
- Genus: Brachygalea
- Species: B. albolineata

Binomial name
- Brachygalea albolineata (Blachier, 1905)

Synonyms
- Calophasia albolineata Blachier, 1905; Criophasia albolineata Rothschild, 1915

Species of moth

Brachygalea albolineata is a moth of the family Noctuidae. The species was first described by Charles Theodore Blachier in 1905. It is found from the western parts of the Sahara through the desert areas of the African Mediterranean to Saudi Arabia, Jordan, Israel, Iraq and southern Iran. It has also been recorded from south-eastern Spain.

Adults are on wing from January to April. There is one generation per year.
