= Antarchaea terminalis =

Scientific classification
- Domain: Eukaryota
- Kingdom: Animalia
- Phylum: Arthropoda
- Class: Insecta
- Order: Lepidoptera
- Superfamily: Noctuoidea
- Family: Noctuidae (?)
- Genus: Antarchaea
- Species: A. terminalis

Binomial name
- Antarchaea terminalis (Mabille, 1880)

Synonyms
- Pionea terminalis Mabille, 1880; Evergestis terminalis

Species of moth

Antarchaea terminalis is a moth in the family Noctuidae. It was described by Paul Mabille in 1880. It is found on Madagascar.
