= Pamparama =

Scientific classification
- Kingdom: Animalia
- Phylum: Arthropoda
- Class: Insecta
- Order: Lepidoptera
- Superfamily: Noctuoidea
- Family: Noctuidae
- Subfamily: Oncocnemidinae
- Genus: Pamparama; G. & L. Ronkay, 1995

Genus of moths

Pamparama is a genus of moths of the family Noctuidae, found in southeast Europe and southwest Asia.

== Species ==
- Pamparama acuta (Freyer, 1838)
