= Metlaouia =

Scientific classification
- Kingdom: Animalia
- Phylum: Arthropoda
- Class: Insecta
- Order: Lepidoptera
- Superfamily: Noctuoidea
- Family: Noctuidae
- Subfamily: Cuculliinae
- Genus: Metlaouia; Dumont, 1929

Genus of moths

Metlaouia is a genus of moths of the family Noctuidae. Its distinctness from Cucullia is disputed.

Species include:

- Metlaouia autumna
