= Recophora canteneri =

Scientific classification
- Domain: Eukaryota
- Kingdom: Animalia
- Phylum: Arthropoda
- Class: Insecta
- Order: Lepidoptera
- Superfamily: Noctuoidea
- Family: Noctuidae
- Genus: Recophora
- Species: R. canteneri

Binomial name
- Recophora canteneri (Duponchel, 1833)

Synonyms
- Polia canteneri Duponchel, 1833; Recophora insueta Herrich-Schaffer, 1850; Metopoceras pallidior Rothschild, 1913; Phorocera satanas Boursin, 1962

Species of moth

Recophora canteneri is a moth of the family Noctuidae. It is found in Morocco, Portugal, Spain, France, Italy, Algeria and Mauritania.

Adults are on wing from April to July.

The larvae feed on Herbaceae species.
