= Recophora hreblayi =

Scientific classification
- Kingdom: Animalia
- Phylum: Arthropoda
- Class: Insecta
- Order: Lepidoptera
- Superfamily: Noctuoidea
- Family: Noctuidae
- Genus: Recophora
- Species: R. hreblayi

Binomial name
- Recophora hreblayi Hacker & Ronkay, 2002

Species of moth

Recophora hreblayi is a moth of the family Noctuidae which is endemic to Turkey.
