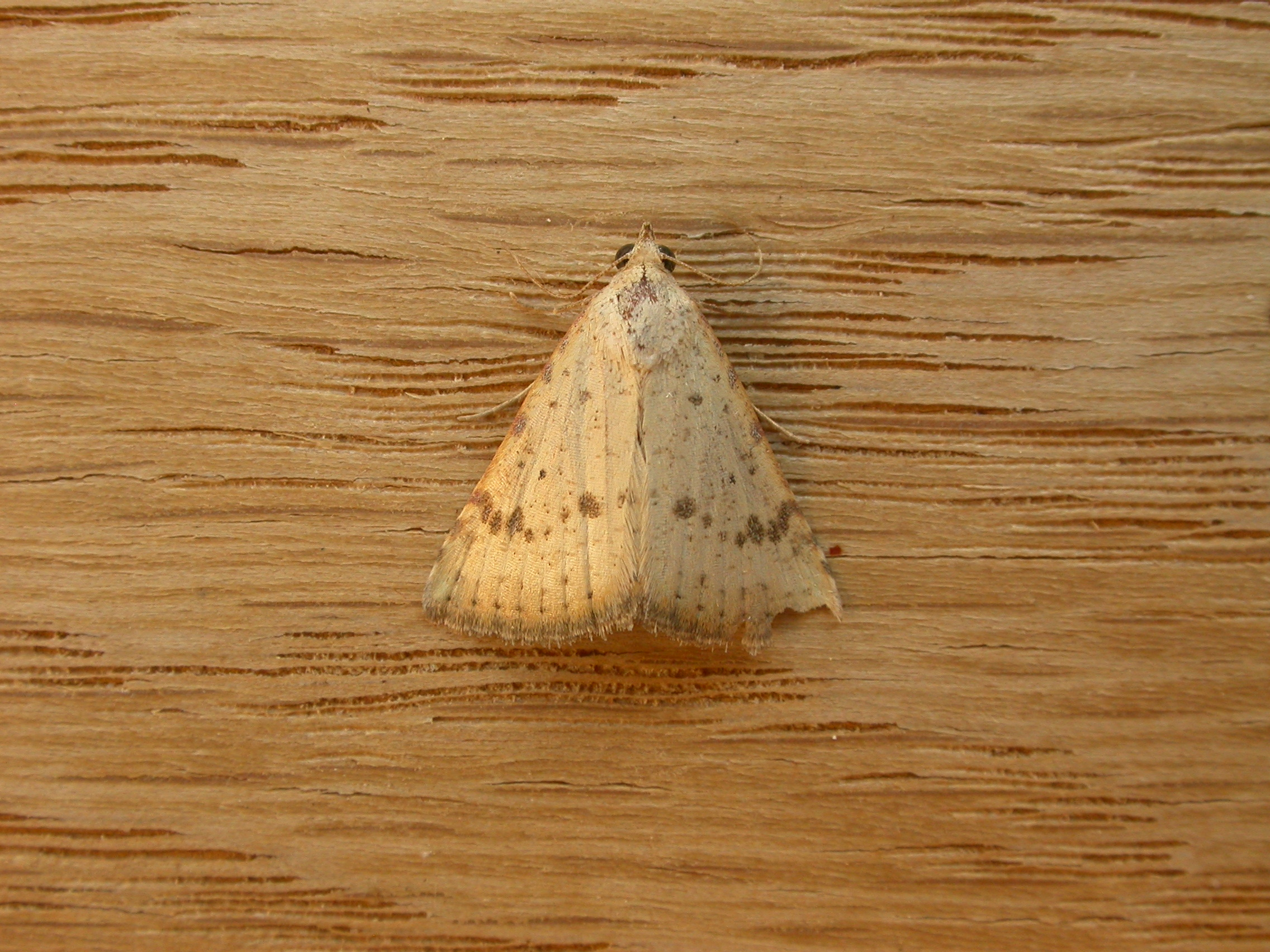

Scientific classification
- Domain: Eukaryota
- Kingdom: Animalia
- Phylum: Arthropoda
- Class: Insecta
- Order: Lepidoptera
- Superfamily: Noctuoidea
- Family: Noctuidae (?)
- Subfamily: Catocalinae
- Genus: Antarchaea; Hübner, 1821

Synonyms
- Byturna Moore, 1883; Myana Swinhoe, 1884; Pseudomicra Butler, 1892

= Antarchaea =

Genus of moths

Antarchaea is a genus of moths of the family Noctuidae.

== Selected species ==
- Antarchaea digramma (Walker, 1863)
- Antarchaea erubescens A. Bang-Haas, 1910
- Antarchaea flavissima Hacker & Saldaitis, 2010
- Antarchaea fragilis (Butler, 1875)
- Antarchaea malhamana Hacker & Fibiger, 2006
- Antarchaea signifera Hampson, 1926
- Antarchaea straminea Hampson, 1926
- Antarchaea terminalis (Mabille, 1880)
