= Catocala olgaorlovae =

Scientific classification
- Kingdom: Animalia
- Phylum: Arthropoda
- Class: Insecta
- Order: Lepidoptera
- Superfamily: Noctuoidea
- Family: Erebidae
- Genus: Catocala
- Species: C. olgaorlovae

Binomial name
- Catocala olgaorlovae Kravchenko et al., 2008

Species of moth

Catocala olgaorlovae is a moth of the family Erebidae first described by Vasiliy D. Kravchenko et al. in 2008. It is known only from the southern Levant where it was collected in two oases of the central Negev, En Avdat, En Ziq, and from the Egyptian central Sinai Peninsula near Santa Katharina.

The wingspan is 86–95 mm (3.4–3.7 in). Adults are on wing from August to September.

== Subspecies ==
- Catocala olgaorlovae olgaorlovae
- Catocala olgaorlovae duschara Lewandowski & Tober, 2008 (Jordan)
