= Metalopha gloriosa =

Scientific classification
- Kingdom: Animalia
- Phylum: Arthropoda
- Class: Insecta
- Order: Lepidoptera
- Superfamily: Noctuoidea
- Family: Noctuidae
- Genus: Metalopha
- Species: M. gloriosa

Binomial name
- Metalopha gloriosa (Staudinger, 1892)

Synonyms
- Antholopha gloriosa Christoph, 1887

Species of moth

Metalopha gloriosa is a moth of the family Noctuidae first described by Otto Staudinger in 1887. It is found from western Turkey to eastern Taurus Mountains, Iraq, Anatolia, Israel, Jordan, Lebanon and Syria.

Adults are on wing from February to March. There is one generation per year.

The larvae probably feed on Launaea species.

== Subspecies ==
- Metalopha gloriosa gloriosa
- Metalopha gloriosa ingloria (Israel)
