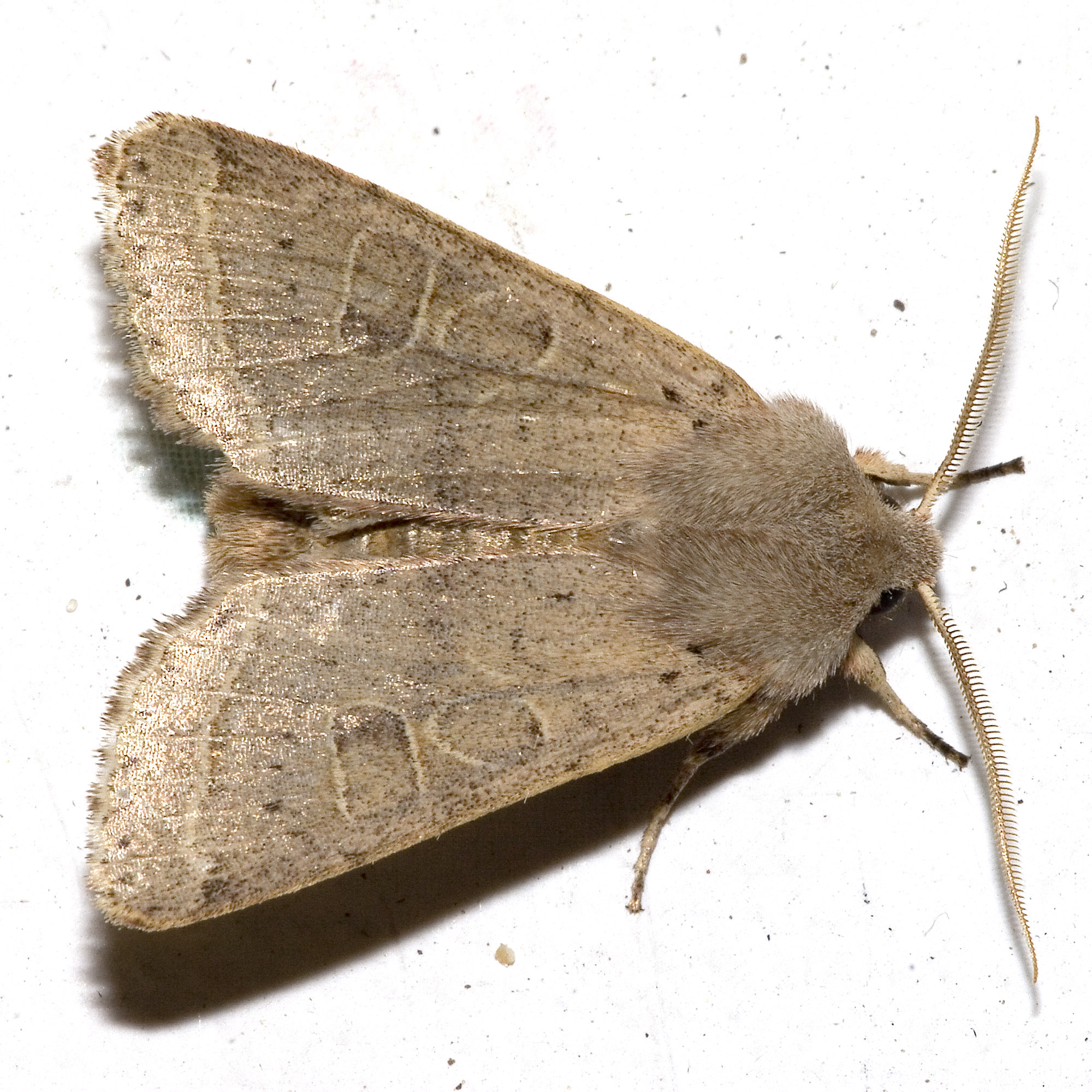

Scientific classification
- Kingdom: Animalia
- Phylum: Arthropoda
- Class: Insecta
- Order: Lepidoptera
- Superfamily: Noctuoidea
- Family: Noctuidae
- Genus: Orthosia
- Species: O. cerasi

Binomial name
- Orthosia cerasi (Fabricius, 1775)

= Common Quaker =

Species of moth

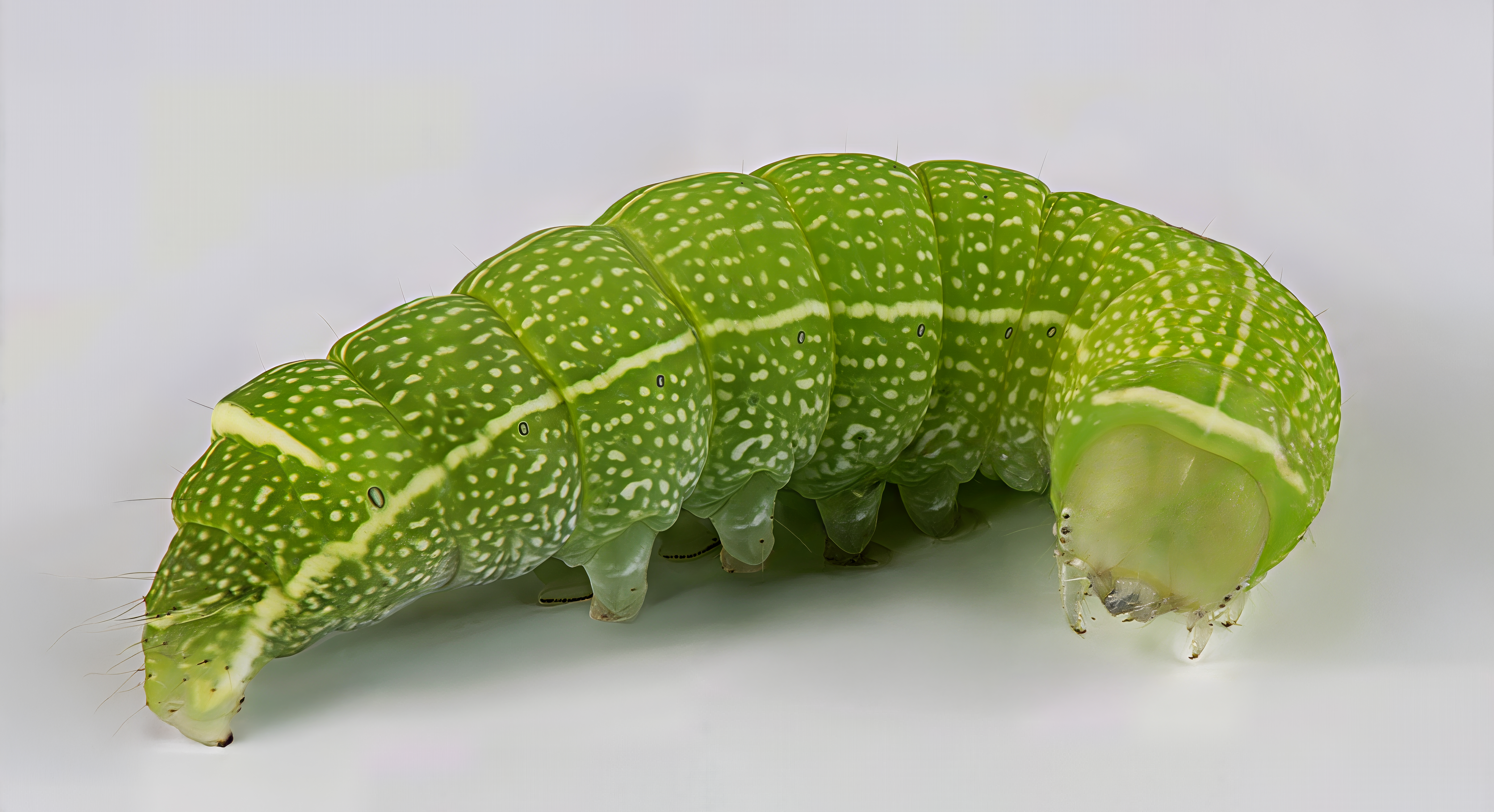
Orthosia cerasi (Fabricius, 1775)

The common Quaker (Orthosia cerasi) is a moth of the family Noctuidae first described by Johan Christian Fabricius in 1775. Some authors prefer the synonym Orthosia stabilis (Denis & Schiffermüller, 1775). It is distributed throughout Europe and is also found in Turkey, Palestine (region), Transcaucasia, Russia and eastern Siberia.

This is a variable species, the ground colour of the forewings ranging from greyish to orangey brown, sometimes with a broad dark band. The most distinctive features are two large stigmata, each edged by a narrow pale line, with a similarly coloured subterminal line. The hindwings are drab grey or brown.

== Technical description and variation ==
The wingspan is 34–40 mm. Forewing reddish grey, more or less dusted with dark: inner and outer lines blackish, indistinct; orbicular and reniform stigmata ringed with ochreous; submarginal line ochreous preceded by a fuscous or rufous shade; claviform mostly unmarked; veins towards termen pale: hindwing grey, the fringe paler. The species varies according to the amount of red present; — ab. pallida Tutt is pale grey, sometimes with an ochreous flush; — obliqua Vill. is darker grey with markings clearer; — suffusa Tutt is an equally well marked blackish-grey form; of these grey forms the second only obliqua Vill. is common; on the other hand when the red tints predominate we get the form rufa Tutt, which is also rare; - in junctus Haw. the upper stigmata, usually separate, are coherent; this accidental connection occurs in all the forms occasionally: — in ab. rufannulata Haw. the stigmata are edged with, and the submarginal line is coloured rufous instead of ochreous.

== Biology ==
This moth flies at night in March and April and is attracted to light and sugar. The adult moth feeds on flower nectar such as Sallow catkins and the flowers of Blackthorn.

Larva green thickly dotted with yellowish white; all the lines yellowish white; anal segment with a yellowish-white cross bar; head green with black spots. It feeds on various trees and shrubs including apple, buckthorn, elm, oak, pear, poplar and willow as well as various Prunus species. The species overwinters as a pupa.

1. The flight season refers to the British Isles. This may vary in other parts of the range.

== Gallery ==
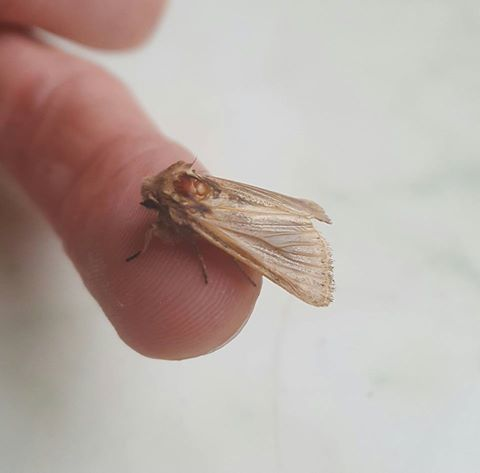

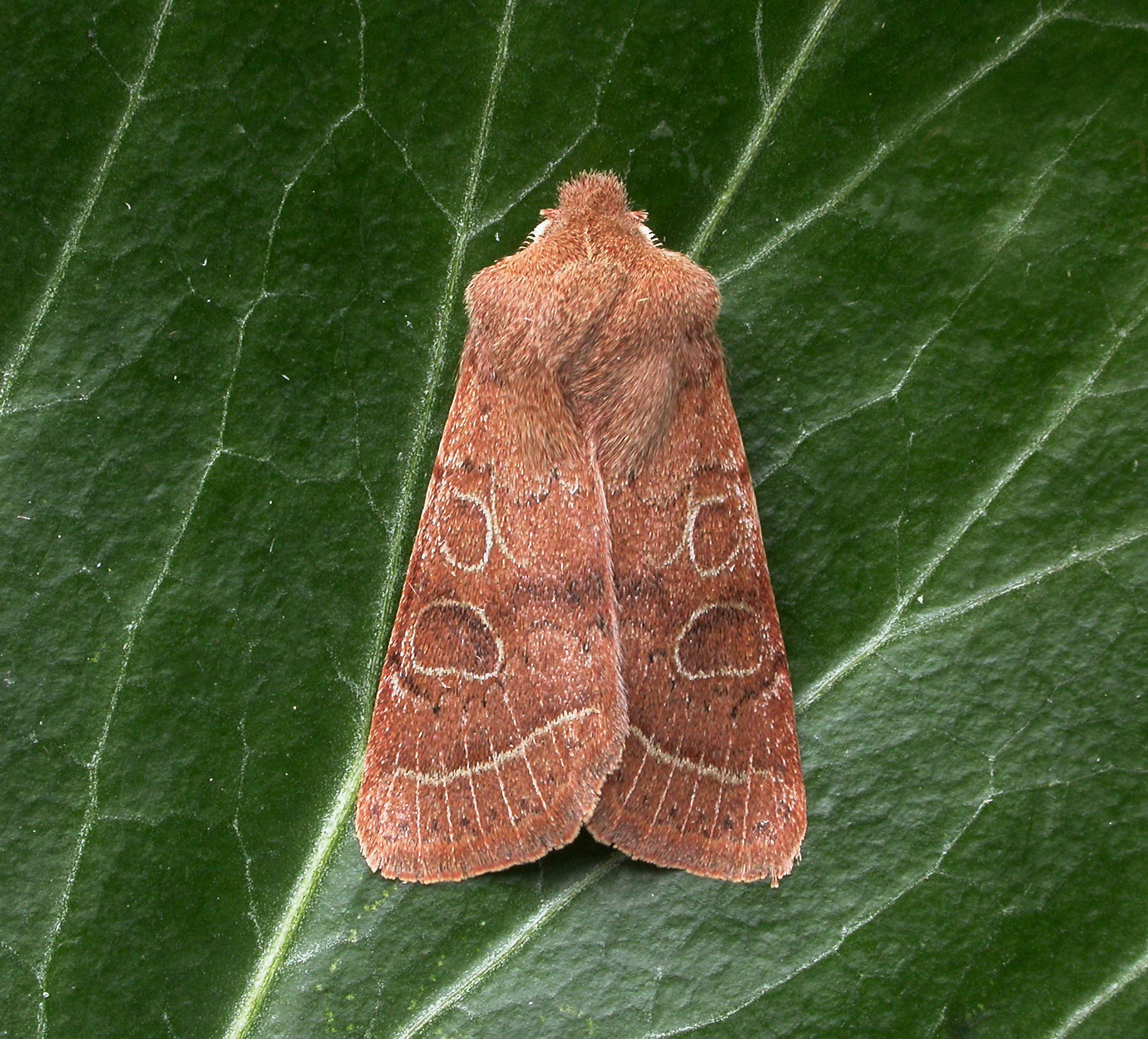

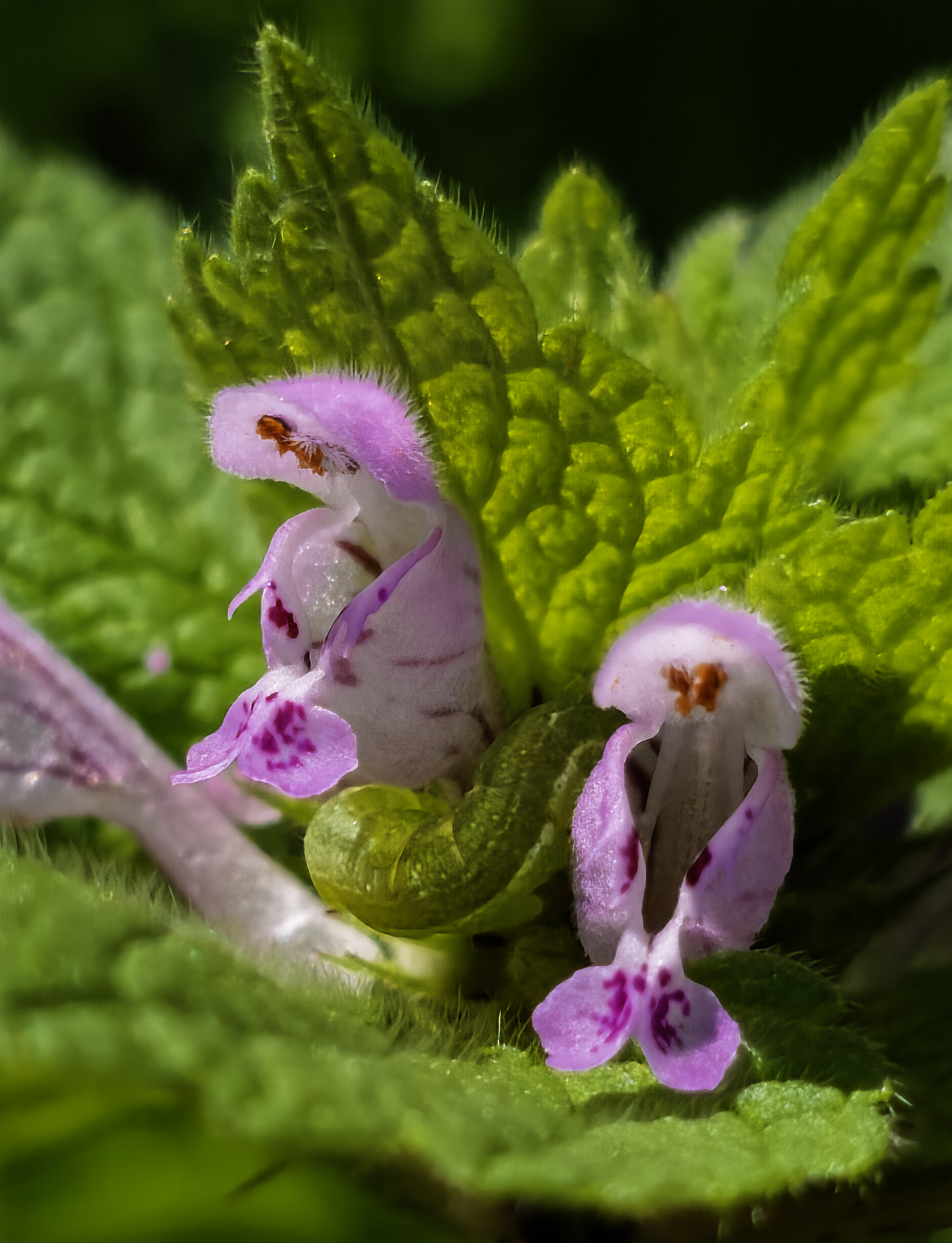

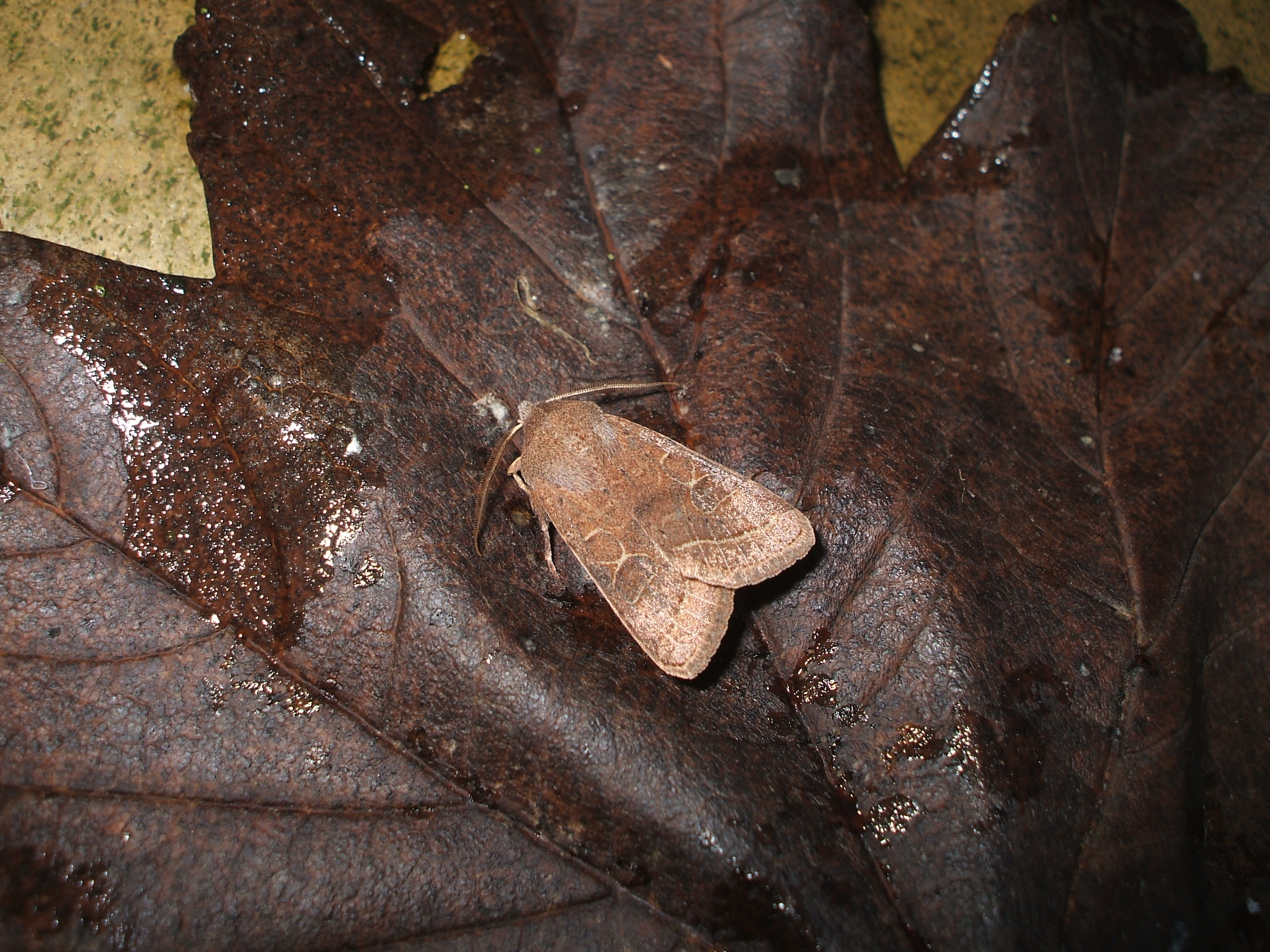

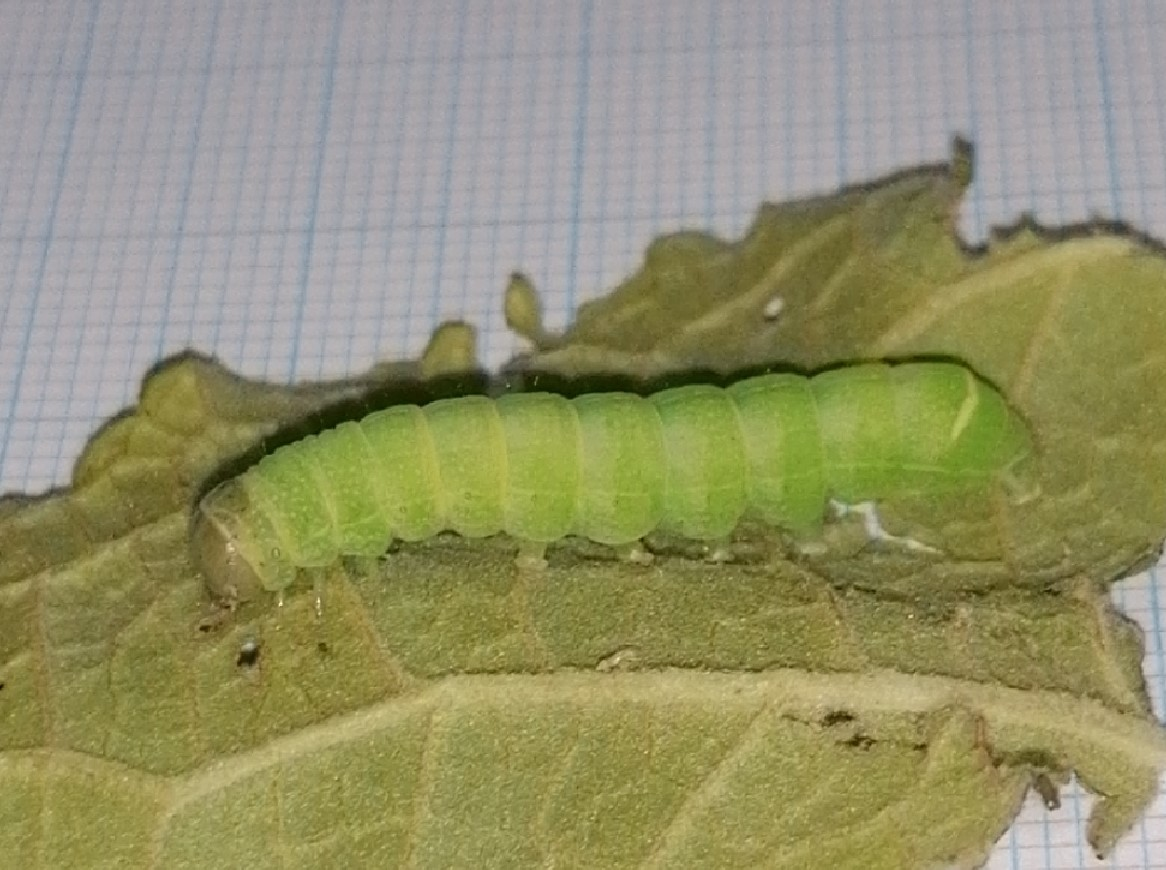

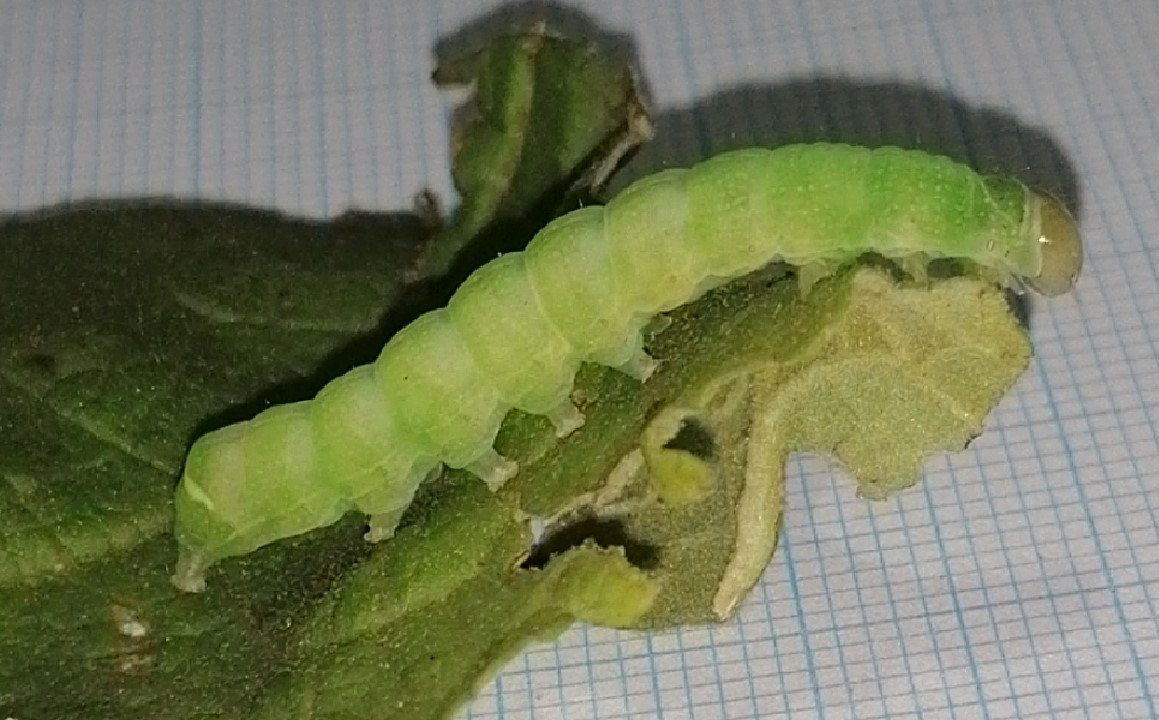

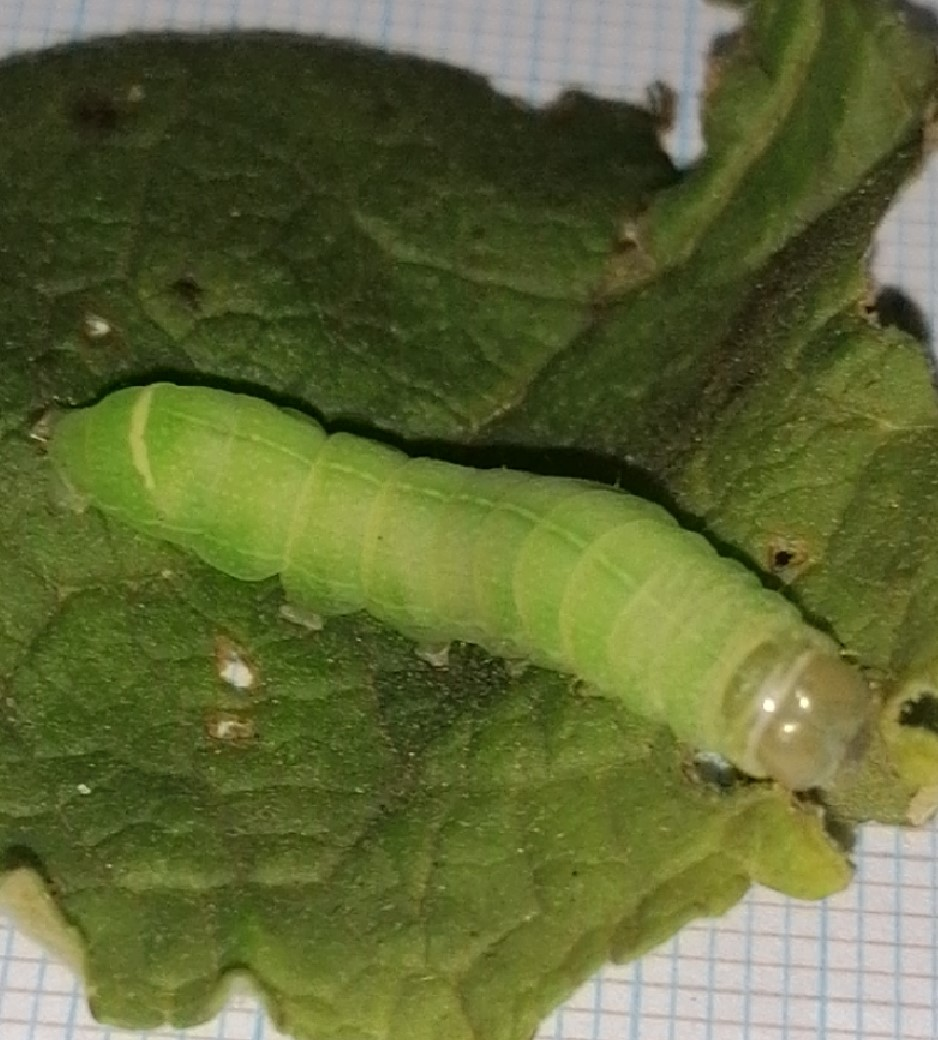

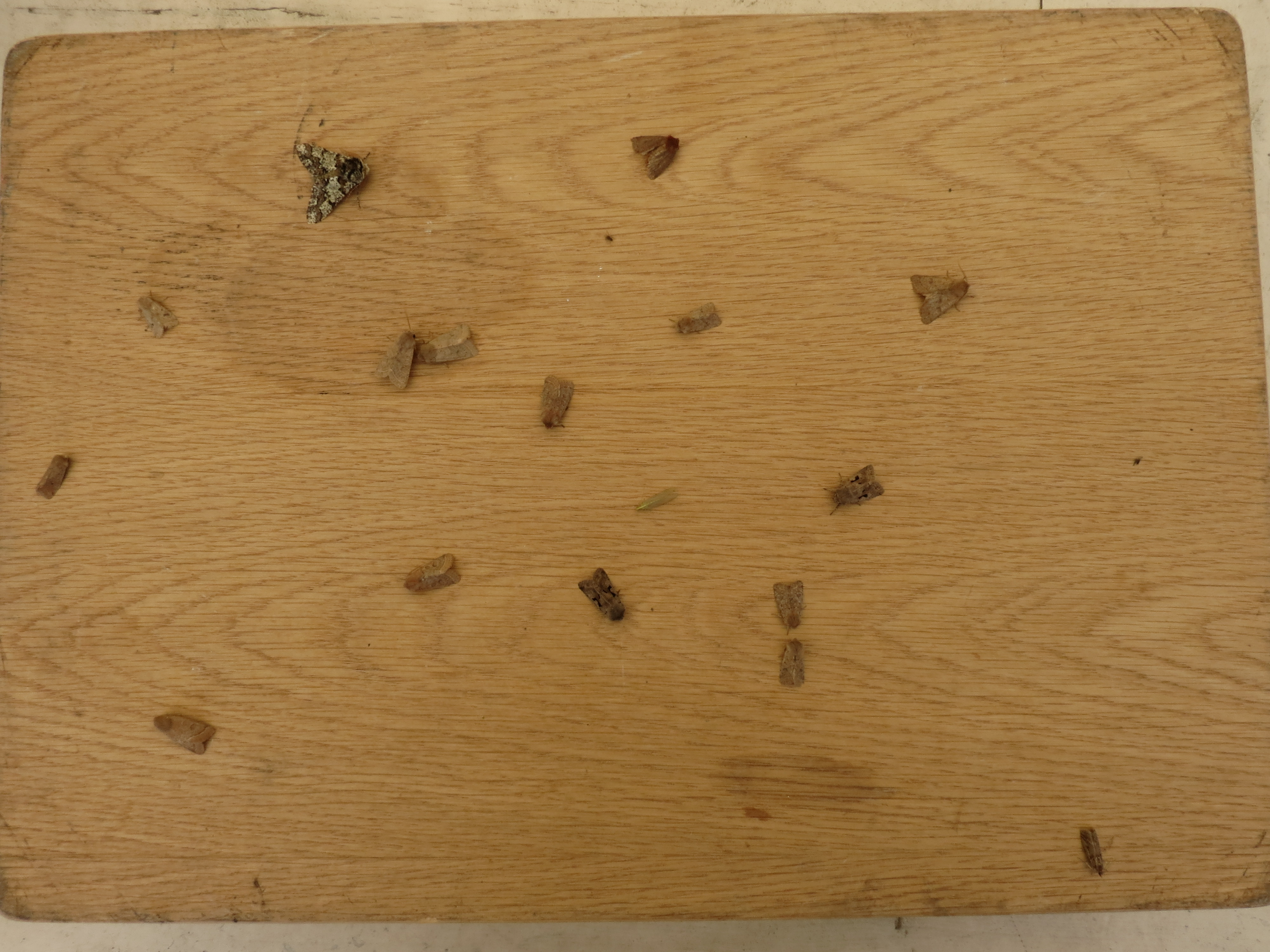

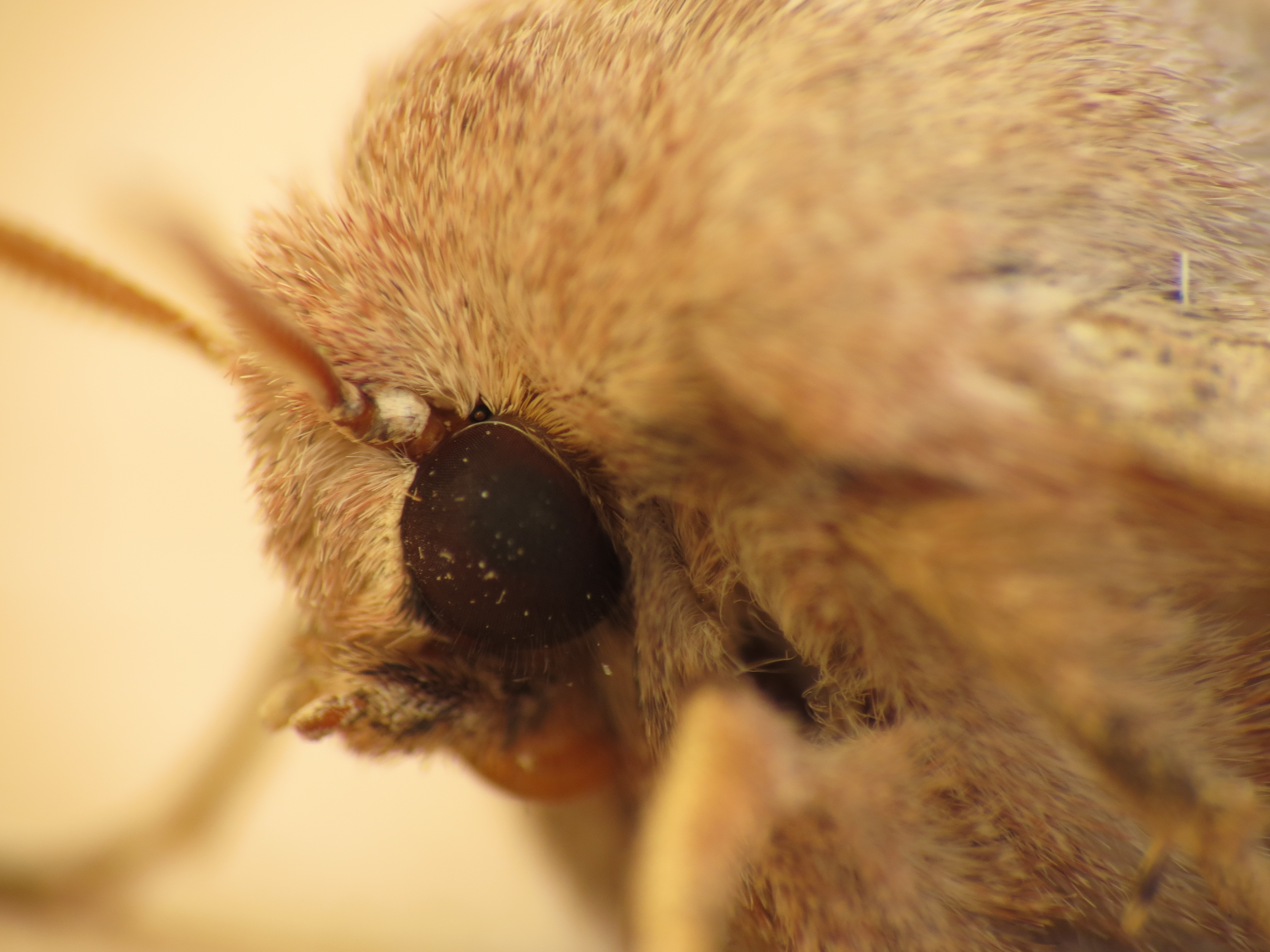

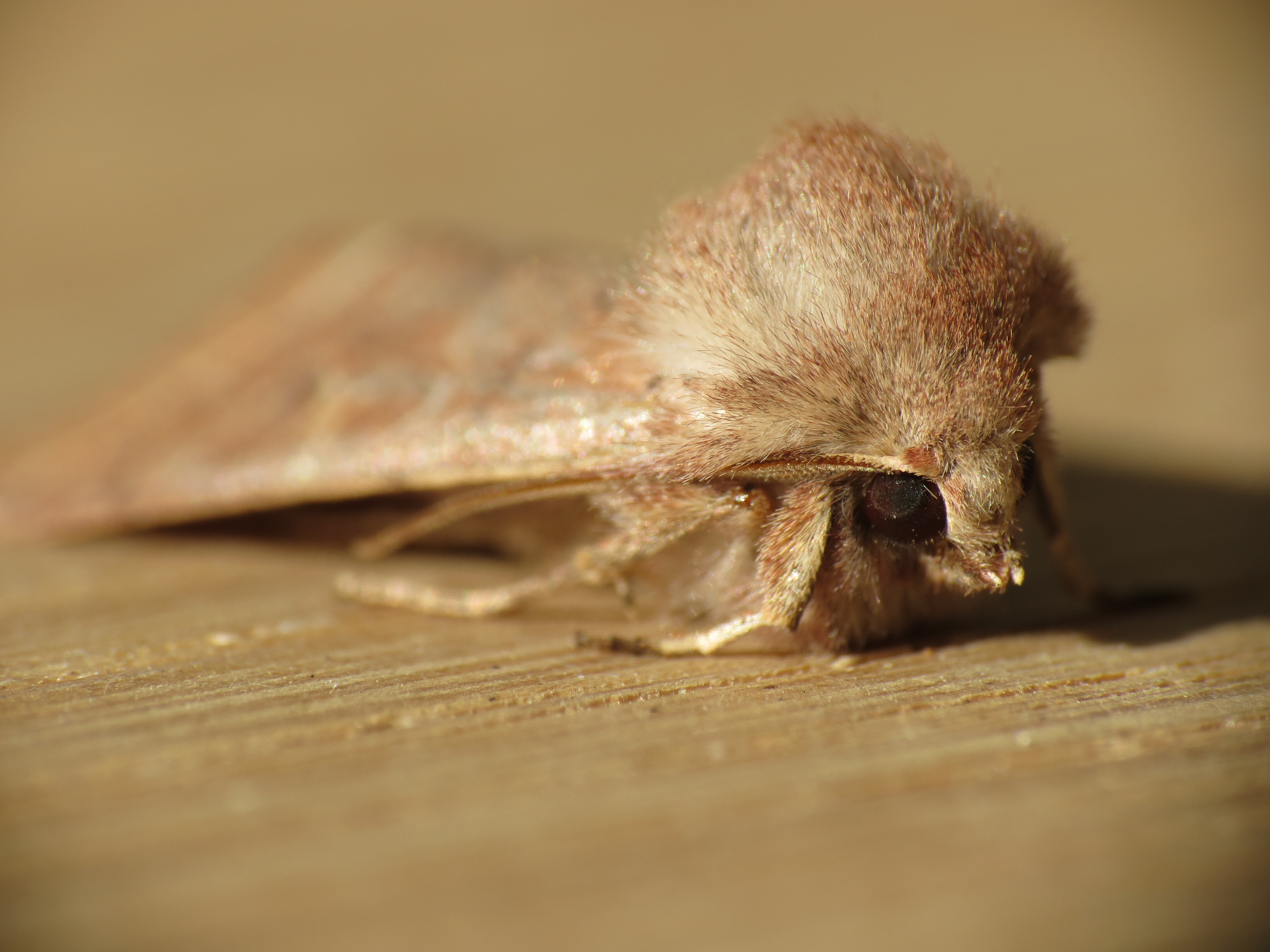
