= Melitaea acentria =

Scientific classification
- Kingdom: Animalia
- Phylum: Arthropoda
- Class: Insecta
- Order: Lepidoptera
- Family: Nymphalidae
- Genus: Melitaea
- Species: M. acentria

Binomial name
- Melitaea acentria Lukhtanov, 2017

Species of butterfly

Melitaea acentria is a butterfly was discovered in 2017 by evolutionary biologist-entomologist Vladimir Lukhtanov over Mount Hermon ski resort, northern Israel. When it was first seen in 2012 it was incorrectly believed that it belonged to the Persian fritillary (Melitaea persea) species due to its similar appearance. Once the internal anatomy and DNA was researched, this was discounted as it had the Acentria's fritillary DNA, different genitalia and a unique molecular signature. It is more than 1.5 million years old and is Israel’s first newly-discovered butterfly species in over a century. Its natural habitat is northern Israel, Syria and Lebanon. It is among a very few butterflies that has resulted from hybridisation between two other species in the past.
