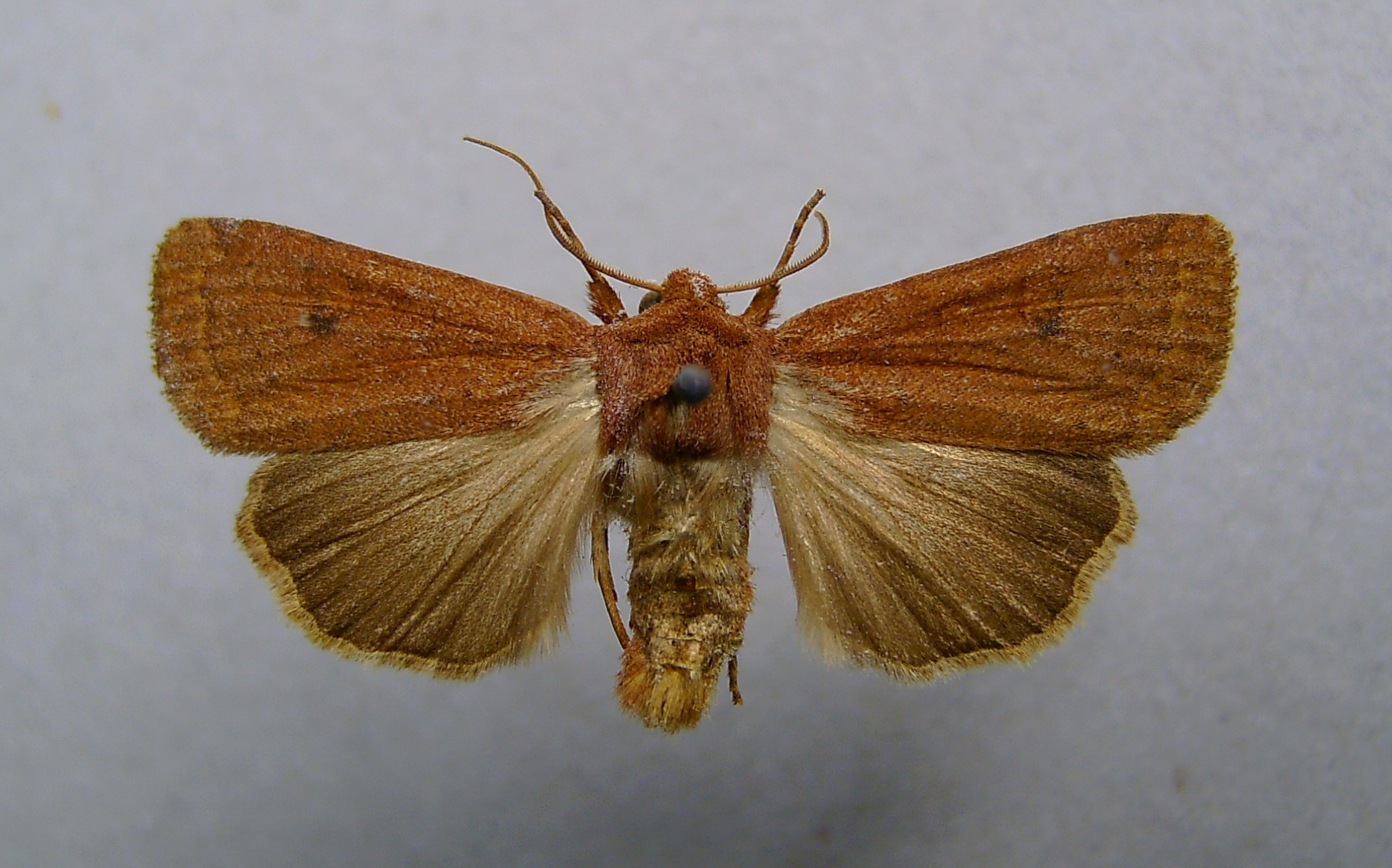

Scientific classification
- Kingdom: Animalia
- Phylum: Arthropoda
- Class: Insecta
- Order: Lepidoptera
- Superfamily: Noctuoidea
- Family: Noctuidae
- Genus: Xestia
- Species: X. castanea

Binomial name
- Xestia castanea (Esper, [1798])

Synonyms
- Phalaena (Noctua) castanea Esper, 1798; Noctua neglecta Hübner, [1803]; Cerastis cerasina Freyer, 1840; Agrotis obsolescens Petersen, 1905

= Xestia castanea =

Species of moth

Xestia castanea, the grey rustic or neglected rustic, is a moth of the family Noctuidae. It is found from central Europe to Morocco, Turkey, Lebanon, Israel, Jordan and Syria.

== Technical description and variation ==
The wingspan is 36–42 mm. Forewing pale grey, with a more or less general rufous tinge; Lines and stigmata all obscure; lower lobe of reniform dark; hindwing fuscous; anal tufts of abdomen of male reddish. — In the ab. cerasina Frr. the red tints predominate to such an extent that the whole forewing is dull deep red, while in ab. neglecta Hbn the red is wholly lost and the insect is dull grey: this is the common form in Britain, where the typical castanea is rarer and cerasina unknown; — the form xanthe Woodf. should have the ground colour yellow; — ab. pallida Tutt from Scotland is whitish ochreous; the stigmata outlined in red; submarginal line formed of red spots.

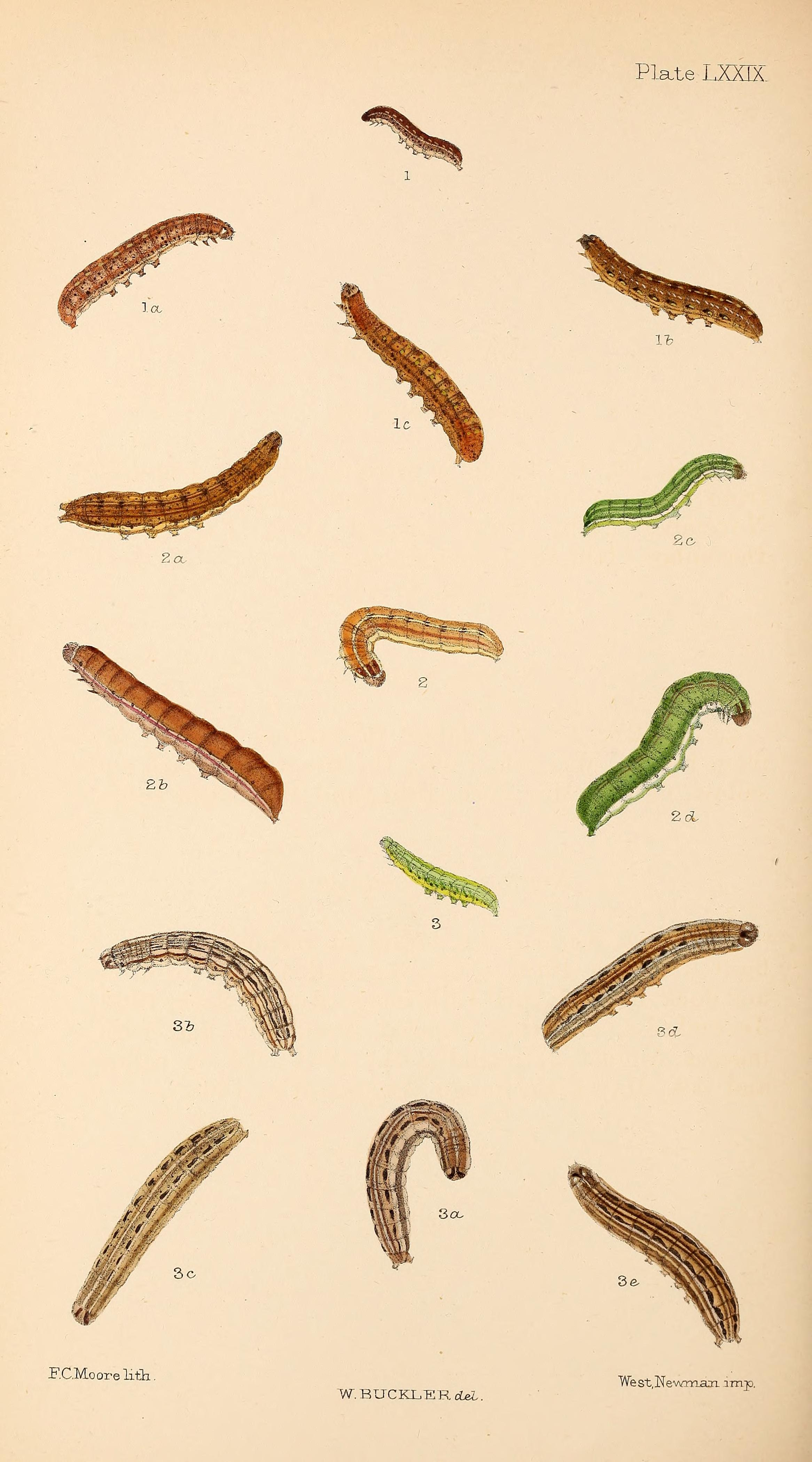
Figs. 2, 2a, 2b, 2c, 2d larvae in various stages

== Biology ==
Adults are on wing between July and November depending on the location. There is one generation per year.

Larva varying from green to dull pink, with darker irroration; spiracular line broadly white, the others merely pale. The larvae feed on various shrubs, including Calluna, Sarothamnus, Vaccinium and Poaceae.
