= Recophora beata =

Scientific classification
- Domain: Eukaryota
- Kingdom: Animalia
- Phylum: Arthropoda
- Class: Insecta
- Order: Lepidoptera
- Superfamily: Noctuoidea
- Family: Noctuidae
- Genus: Recophora
- Species: R. beata

Binomial name
- Recophora beata (Staudinger, 1892)

Species of moth

Recophora beata is a moth of the family Noctuidae. The species was first described by Otto Staudinger in 1892. It is found from Anatolia and southern Turkey eastward to Iraq, south-western Iran, Syria and Israel.

Adults are on wing from May to June. There is one generation per year.
