= Metlaouia autumna =

Scientific classification
- Kingdom: Animalia
- Phylum: Arthropoda
- Class: Insecta
- Order: Lepidoptera
- Superfamily: Noctuoidea
- Family: Noctuidae
- Genus: Metlaouia
- Species: M. autumna

Binomial name
- Metlaouia autumna (Chrétien, 1910)

Species of moth

Metlaouia autumna is a moth of the family Noctuidae first described by Pierre Chrétien in 1910. It is known from the Maghreb area, Tripolitania, the Sinai in Egypt and the northern Negev and northern Arava in Israel

Adults are on wing in November. There is probably one generation per year.

Larvae have been recorded on Artemisia campestris.
