= Antarchaea erubescens =

Scientific classification
- Kingdom: Animalia
- Phylum: Arthropoda
- Class: Insecta
- Order: Lepidoptera
- Superfamily: Noctuoidea
- Family: Noctuidae (?)
- Genus: Antarchaea
- Species: A. erubescens

Binomial name
- Antarchaea erubescens A. Bang-Haas, 1910

Species of moth

Antarchaea erubescens is a species of moth of the family Noctuidae first described by Andreas Bang-Haas in 1910. It is found from Morocco to the Arabian Peninsula southern Iran and Afghanistan.

Adults are on wing from April to June and again in autumn. There are two generations per year.
