= Metalopha liturata =

Scientific classification
- Kingdom: Animalia
- Phylum: Arthropoda
- Class: Insecta
- Order: Lepidoptera
- Superfamily: Noctuoidea
- Family: Noctuidae
- Genus: Metalopha
- Species: M. liturata

Binomial name
- Metalopha liturata (Christoph, 1887)

Synonyms
- Metalopha plusina Staudinger, 1892; Metalopha kashmirensis Harnpson, 1894; Megalodes liturata Christoph, 1887

Species of moth

Metalopha liturata is a moth of the family Noctuidae. The species was first described by Hugo Theodor Christoph in 1887. It is widespread but local in the Near East and Middle East from the Levant area to the western Himalayas (Turkey, Iran, Turkmenistan, Afghanistan, Iraq, Syria, Jordan and Israel).

Adults are on wing from March to May. There is one generation per year.
