= Euxoa foeda =

Scientific classification
- Kingdom: Animalia
- Phylum: Arthropoda
- Class: Insecta
- Order: Lepidoptera
- Superfamily: Noctuoidea
- Family: Noctuidae
- Genus: Euxoa
- Species: E. foeda

Binomial name
- Euxoa foeda (Lederer, 1855)

Synonyms
- Agrotis foeda Lederer, 1855; Agrotis enitens Corti, 1926; Euxoa vanensis Draudt, 1937

Species of moth

Euxoa foeda is a moth of the family Noctuidae. It is found from the Altai Mountains through the Near East and Middle East to Turkey and the Levant.

Adults are on wing in June to September. There is one generation per year.
