= Pamparama acuta =

Scientific classification
- Domain: Eukaryota
- Kingdom: Animalia
- Phylum: Arthropoda
- Class: Insecta
- Order: Lepidoptera
- Superfamily: Noctuoidea
- Family: Noctuidae
- Subfamily: Oncocnemidinae
- Genus: Pamparama
- Species: P. acuta

Binomial name
- Pamparama acuta (Freyer, 1838)

Synonyms
- Acronycta acuta Freyer, 1837

Species of moth

Pamparama acuta is a moth of the family Noctuidae first described by Christian Friedrich Freyer in 1838. It is found in Asia Minor and the Near East (Turkey, Armenia, Azerbaijan, northern Iraq, Israel, Palestine, Jordan and Lebanon).

Adults are on wing from March to May. There is one generation per year.
