= Armada panaceorum =

Scientific classification
- Kingdom: Animalia
- Phylum: Arthropoda
- Class: Insecta
- Order: Lepidoptera
- Superfamily: Noctuoidea
- Family: Noctuidae
- Genus: Armada
- Species: A. panaceorum

Binomial name
- Armada panaceorum Ménétries, 1848

Synonyms
- Ophiusa panaceorum; Armada panaceorum distincta

Species of moth

Armada panaceorum is a moth of the family Noctuidae first described by Édouard Ménétries in 1848. It is found in the arid parts of North Africa, the Near East and the Middle East, Kazakhstan, eastern Afghanistan, Mongolia, Tibet and south-eastern Turkey.

There is one generation per year. Adults are on wing from March to April.

The larvae feed on Arnebia decumbens, Lappula ceratophora and Heterocaryum rigidum
