= Brachygalea kalchbergi =

Scientific classification
- Domain: Eukaryota
- Kingdom: Animalia
- Phylum: Arthropoda
- Class: Insecta
- Order: Lepidoptera
- Superfamily: Noctuoidea
- Family: Noctuidae
- Genus: Brachygalea
- Species: B. kalchbergi

Binomial name
- Brachygalea kalchbergi (Staudinger, 1897)

Synonyms
- Antitype kalchbergi (Staudinger, 1897); Polia kalchbergi Staudinger, 1897; Antitype calchbergi Hampson, 1906

Species of moth

Brachygalea kalchbergi is a moth of the family Noctuidae. The species was first described by Otto Staudinger in 1897. It is known only from Israel and Jordan.

Adults are on wing from March to April. There is one generation per year.
