= Iranada turcorum =

Scientific classification
- Kingdom: Animalia
- Phylum: Arthropoda
- Class: Insecta
- Order: Lepidoptera
- Superfamily: Noctuoidea
- Family: Noctuidae
- Genus: Iranada
- Species: I. turcorum

Binomial name
- Iranada turcorum Zerny, 1915

Synonyms
- Iranada turcorum turcorum; Iranada turcorum atrior

Species of moth

Iranada turcorum is a moth of the family Noctuidae first described by Hans Zerny in 1915. It is found in Syria, Lebanon, Israel, Jordan, Egypt, Iraq, Oman and south-western Iran.

There is one generation per year. Adults are on wing from March to April.
