= Africalpe intrusa =

Scientific classification
- Kingdom: Animalia
- Phylum: Arthropoda
- Clade: Pancrustacea
- Class: Insecta
- Order: Lepidoptera
- Superfamily: Noctuoidea
- Family: Erebidae
- Genus: Africalpe
- Species: A. intrusa

Binomial name
- Africalpe intrusa Krüger, 1939

Species of moth

Africalpe intrusa is a moth of the family Erebidae. It is found in Saudi Arabia, Oman, the United Arab Emirates, Yemen, parts of Israel, eastern and north-eastern Africa (including Libya and Sudan) and the Western Sahara.

Adults are on wing nearly year round, except December and January.
