= Catocala editarevayae =

Scientific classification
- Kingdom: Animalia
- Phylum: Arthropoda
- Class: Insecta
- Order: Lepidoptera
- Superfamily: Noctuoidea
- Family: Erebidae
- Genus: Catocala
- Species: C. editarevayae

Binomial name
- Catocala editarevayae Kravchenko et al., 2008

Species of moth

Catocala editarevayae is a moth of the family Erebidae first described by Vasiliy D. Kravchenko et al. in 2008. It is known only from Jordan and Israel.

The wingspan is 87–90 mm. Adults are on wing from July to September.

The larvae are probably monophagous on Populus species.
