= Catocala brandti =

Scientific classification
- Kingdom: Animalia
- Phylum: Arthropoda
- Class: Insecta
- Order: Lepidoptera
- Superfamily: Noctuoidea
- Family: Erebidae
- Genus: Catocala
- Species: C. brandti

Binomial name
- Catocala brandti Hacker & Kautt, 1999

Species of moth

Catocala brandti is a moth of the family Erebidae first described by Hermann Heinrich Hacker and Peter Kautt in 1999. It is found in Greece, south-eastern Turkey, Iran and Israel.

== Subspecies ==
- Catocala brandti brandti (Turkey, Iran and Israel)
- Catocala brandti schaideri Habeler & Hacker, 1999 (Greece)
