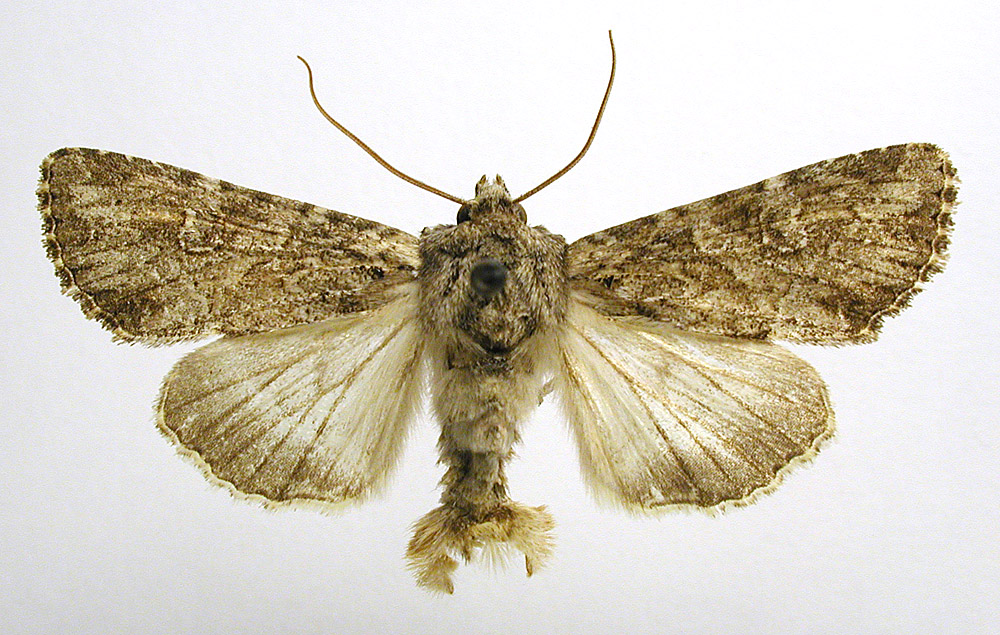

Scientific classification
- Domain: Eukaryota
- Kingdom: Animalia
- Phylum: Arthropoda
- Class: Insecta
- Order: Lepidoptera
- Superfamily: Noctuoidea
- Family: Noctuidae
- Genus: Apamea
- Species: A. anceps

Binomial name
- Apamea anceps (Denis & Schiffermüller, 1775)

Synonyms
- Noctua anceps Denis & Schiffermüller, 1775; Phalaena (Noctua) sordida Borkhausen, 1792; Apamea infesta Ochsenheimer, 1816; Caradrina renardii Boisduval, 1829; Hadena engelhardtii Duurloo, 1889; Luceria pyxina A. Bang-Haas, 1910; Enargia siegeli Berio, 1985; Apamea pyxina sassanidica Hacker, 1990; Apamea anceps mazeli Lutran, 1993; Arenostola pyxina

= Apamea anceps =

Large nutmeg

Species of moth

Apamea anceps, the large nutmeg, is a moth of the family Noctuidae. The species was first described by Michael Denis and Ignaz Schiffermüller in 1775.

== Geography ==
The large nutmeg is distributed throughout Europe and through the Palearctic realm to Yakutia, Transbaikalia, Lebanon, Armenia, Asia Minor, Iran, Mongolia eastern Siberia, the Chinese province of Shaanxi, and Japan. It is also found in North West Africa.

== Description ==
The wingspan is 35–40 mm. Forewing grey speckled with darker, and more or less tinged with brown; the veins dark; inner and outer lines double, dark filled in with pale ground colour, conversely lunulate-dentate; the inner line sometimes forming a sharp outward angle below vein 1, meeting the median line, sometimes rounded ami remote from it: claviform brown, darker edged, variable in size, often quite small; orbicular and reniform pale with dark centres, the latter with white dotted annulus and often followed by a pale patch; marginal area dark grey beyond the pale submarginal line, which is preceded by brownish patches at costa and on both folds: hindwing dirty whitish, with darker cellspot, veins, and outer line, the terminal area diffusely fuscous, with the submarginal line showing paler along termen; in typical sordida the brown tints are confined to the two folds: -in anceps Hbn. these brown tints pervade more or less the whole forewing: - ochracea Tutt has the ground colour paler and the suffusion more rufous brown; renardii Bsd. is a very pale form with the markings subobsolete; while engelhartii Duurloo represents a renardii pale form from eastern Jutland with indistinct markings; - ab. mediana ab. nov. [Warren] appears very distinct; the brown-grey ground colour is without dark speckling; the inner and outer lines are single, black and distinct, the outer with clear black teeth on the veins; the median shade, generally inconspicuous, is thick and black, distinctly angled outwards on subcostal and veins 1 and 2; the space between it and outer line deeper brown: the markings of the hindwing clearer; the male specimen from Germany without precise locality.

Adults are on wing from June to July.

== Larvae, caterpillars ==
The larvae feed on the flowers and leaves of various grasses, including Poa annua and Dactylis glomerata. The caterpillars overwinter. They feed on grasses and are also considered pests of cereals.
