= Sympistis confusa =

Scientific classification
- Domain: Eukaryota
- Kingdom: Animalia
- Phylum: Arthropoda
- Class: Insecta
- Order: Lepidoptera
- Superfamily: Noctuoidea
- Family: Noctuidae
- Genus: Sympistis
- Species: S. confusa

Binomial name
- Sympistis confusa (Freyer, 1842)

Synonyms
- Amphipyra confusa Freyer, 1842; Oncocnemis confusa

Species of moth

Sympistis confusa is a moth of the family Noctuidae first described by Christian Friedrich Freyer in 1842. It is found in Iran, Iraq, Asia Minor, northwards to Turkmenistan, the European part of southeast Russia and the Black Sea shores of Bulgaria.

Adults are on wing from June to August. There is one generation per year.

== Subspecies ==
- Sympistis confusa confusa
- Sympistis confusa persica
- Sympistis confusa michaelorum (Bulgaria)
