= Pachyagrotis tischendorfi =

Scientific classification
- Kingdom: Animalia
- Phylum: Arthropoda
- Class: Insecta
- Order: Lepidoptera
- Superfamily: Noctuoidea
- Family: Noctuidae
- Genus: Pachyagrotis
- Species: P. tischendorfi

Binomial name
- Pachyagrotis tischendorfi (Püngeler, 1925)

Synonyms
- Euxoa tischendorfi Püngeler, 1925

Species of moth

Pachyagrotis tischendorfi is a moth of the family Noctuidae. It is found in the steppes and semi-deserts of south-eastern Turkey, Armenia, Lebanon, Israel, Syria, Jordan and Saudi Arabia.

Adults are on wing in November. There is one generation per year.
