= Dicerogastra chersotoides =

Scientific classification
- Kingdom: Animalia
- Phylum: Arthropoda
- Clade: Pancrustacea
- Class: Insecta
- Order: Lepidoptera
- Superfamily: Noctuoidea
- Family: Noctuidae
- Genus: Dicerogastra
- Species: D. chersotoides

Binomial name
- Dicerogastra chersotoides (Wiltshire, 1956)

Species of moth

Dicerogastra chersotoides is a species of moth of the family Noctuidae. It is found in Israel, Jordan, Saudi Arabia and Oman.

Adults are on wing from September to November in semi-arid areas and from June to July in temperate regions. There are possibly two generations per year.
