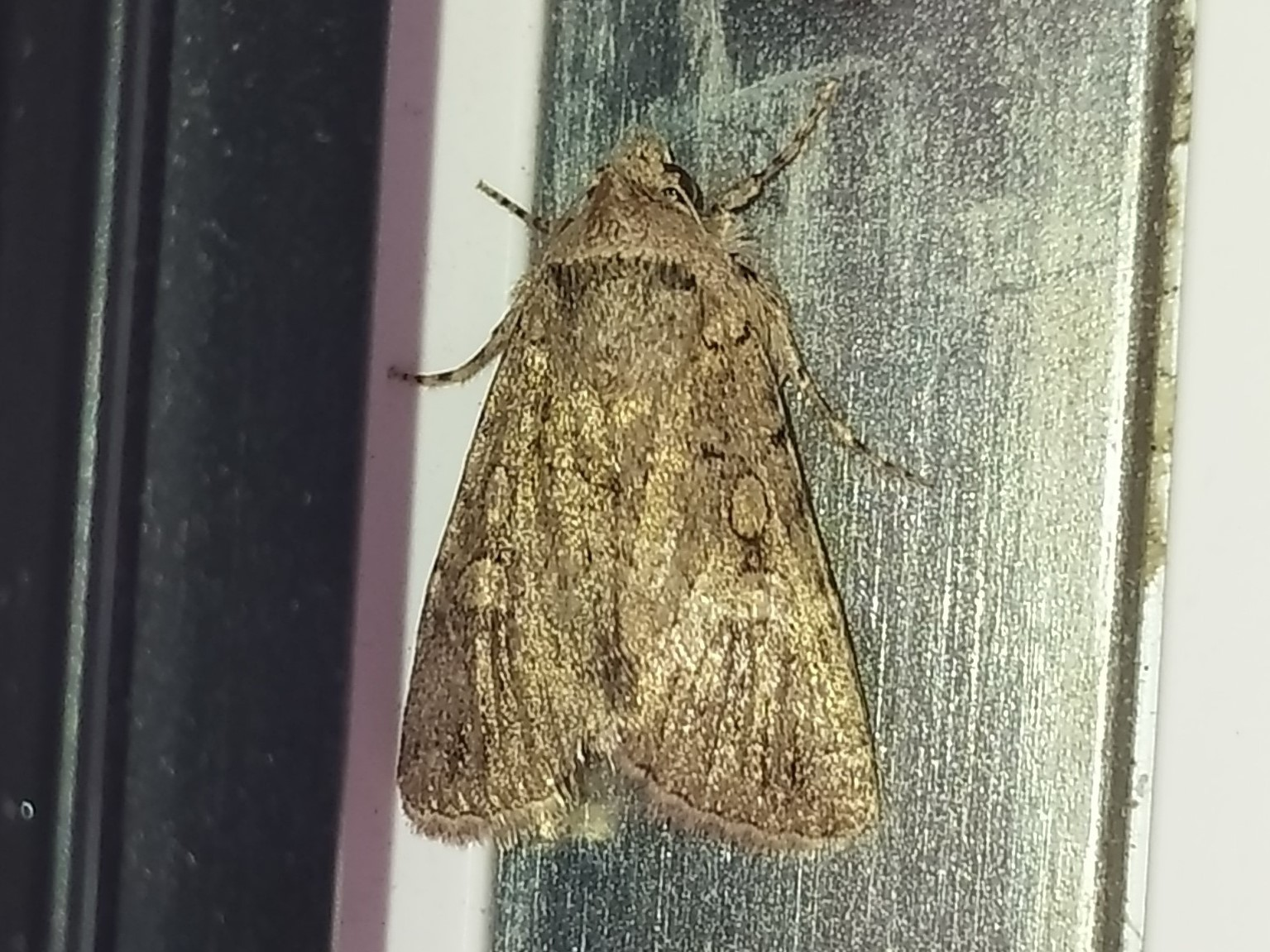

Scientific classification
- Domain: Eukaryota
- Kingdom: Animalia
- Phylum: Arthropoda
- Class: Insecta
- Order: Lepidoptera
- Superfamily: Noctuoidea
- Family: Noctuidae
- Genus: Sympistis
- Species: S. strioligera

Binomial name
- Sympistis strioligera Lederer, 1853

Synonyms
- Oncocnemis strioligera

= Sympistis strioligera =

Species of moth

Sympistis strioligera is a species of moth in the family Noctuidae, first described by Julius Lederer in 1853. It is found from Asia Minor throughout Iran and Afghanistan and Turkestan to the Altai Mountains, Mongolia and inner Asia.

Adults are on wing from June to August. There is one generation per year.
