= Euchalcia augusta =

Scientific classification
- Kingdom: Animalia
- Phylum: Arthropoda
- Class: Insecta
- Order: Lepidoptera
- Superfamily: Noctuoidea
- Family: Noctuidae
- Genus: Euchalcia
- Species: E. augusta

Binomial name
- Euchalcia augusta (Staudinger, 1891)

Synonyms
- Plusia augusta Staudinger, 1891

Species of moth

Euchalcia augusta is a moth of the family Noctuidae. It is found from the Taurus Mountains to Lake Van in Turkey. In the Levant it has been recorded from Syria and Israel.

Adults are on wing from April to May. There is one generation per year.

== Subspecies ==
- Euchalcia augusta augusta
- Euchalcia augusta wolfi (Turkey)
