= Odontelia daphnadeparisae =

Scientific classification
- Kingdom: Animalia
- Phylum: Arthropoda
- Clade: Pancrustacea
- Class: Insecta
- Order: Lepidoptera
- Superfamily: Noctuoidea
- Family: Noctuidae
- Genus: Odontelia
- Species: O. daphnadeparisae

Binomial name
- Odontelia daphnadeparisae Kravchenko, Ronkay, Speidel, Mooser & Müller, 2007

Species of moth

Odontelia daphnadeparisae is a species of moth of the family Noctuidae. It is probably endemic to the Levant. It is known only from Israel and Jordan.

Adults are on wing from December to March. There is one generation per year.
