= Armada nilotica =

Scientific classification
- Domain: Eukaryota
- Kingdom: Animalia
- Phylum: Arthropoda
- Class: Insecta
- Order: Lepidoptera
- Superfamily: Noctuoidea
- Family: Noctuidae
- Genus: Armada
- Species: A. nilotica

Binomial name
- Armada nilotica A. Bang-Haas, 1912

Species of moth

Armada nilotica is a moth of the family Noctuidae first described by Andreas Bang-Haas in 1912. It is found in the northern Sinai, Egypt and the Negev.

There is one generation per year. Adults are on wing from March to May.

The larvae feed on Heliotropium luteum and Heliotropium arabense
