= Lithophasia venosula =

Scientific classification
- Domain: Eukaryota
- Kingdom: Animalia
- Phylum: Arthropoda
- Class: Insecta
- Order: Lepidoptera
- Superfamily: Noctuoidea
- Family: Noctuidae
- Genus: Lithophasia
- Species: L. venosula

Binomial name
- Lithophasia venosula Staudinger, 1892

Species of moth

Lithophasia venosula is a moth of the family Noctuidae. The species was first described by Otto Staudinger in 1892. It is probably endemic of the Levant. Thus far it has only been recorded from Lebanon and the forests near Mount Meron in Israel.

Adults are on wing in October. There is probably one generation per year.
