= Lithophasia quadrivirgula =

Scientific classification
- Domain: Eukaryota
- Kingdom: Animalia
- Phylum: Arthropoda
- Class: Insecta
- Order: Lepidoptera
- Superfamily: Noctuoidea
- Family: Noctuidae
- Genus: Lithophasia
- Species: L. quadrivirgula

Binomial name
- Lithophasia quadrivirgula (Mabille, 1888)

Species of moth

Lithophasia quadrivirgula is a moth of the family Noctuidae first described by Paul Mabille in 1888. It is found from Morocco to Egypt, Israel, Jordan and Iraq.

Adults are on wing from November to February. There is probably one generation per year.
