= Epharmottomena eremophila =

Scientific classification
- Domain: Eukaryota
- Kingdom: Animalia
- Phylum: Arthropoda
- Class: Insecta
- Order: Lepidoptera
- Superfamily: Noctuoidea
- Family: Noctuidae
- Genus: Epharmottomena
- Species: E. eremophila

Binomial name
- Epharmottomena eremophila (Rebel, 1895)

Synonyms
- Epharmottomena plumbizonata; Epharmottomena costiplaga; Epharmottomena lacroisi

Species of moth

Epharmottomena eremophila is a moth of the family Noctuidae first described by Hans Rebel in 1895. It is found from Morocco and the western parts of the Sahara, to Sinai, Israel and Syria.

There are probably two generations per year. Adults are on wing in from September to April.
