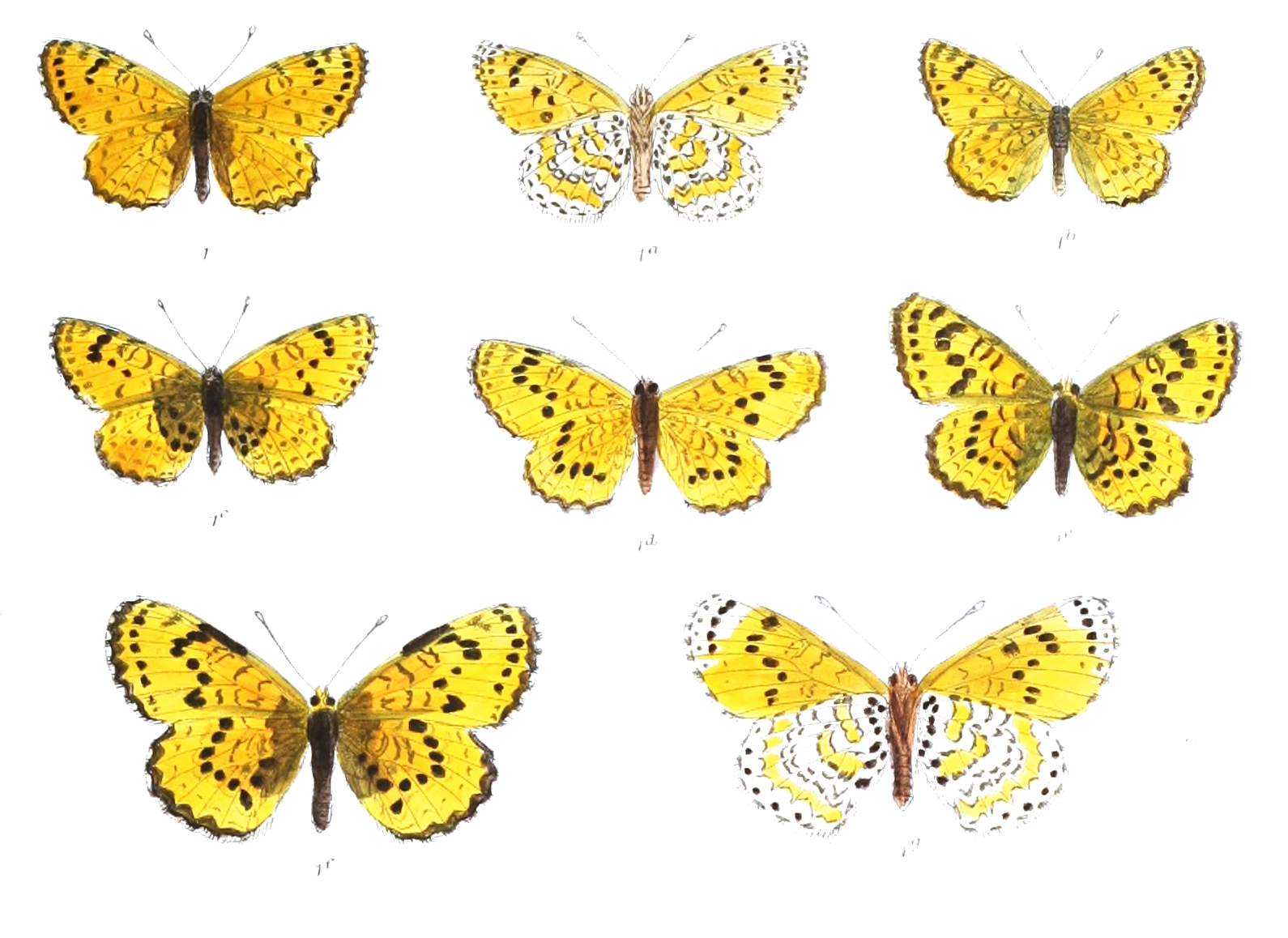

Scientific classification
- Kingdom: Animalia
- Phylum: Arthropoda
- Class: Insecta
- Order: Lepidoptera
- Family: Nymphalidae
- Genus: Melitaea
- Species: M. persea

Binomial name
- Melitaea persea Kollar, [1850]

Synonyms
- Melitaea kaschtschenkoi Christoph, 1889; Melitaea didyma magnacasta Verity, 1929; Melitaea didyma araratica Verity, 1929; Melitaea didyma tauricus Belter, 1934; Melitaea microtauricus Belter, 1934; Melitaea hafiz Higgins, 1941; Melitaea afghana Heydemann, 1954; Melitaea darius Gross & Ebert, 1975; Melitaea pfeifferi Gross & Ebert, 1975; Melitaea montium Belter, 1934

= Melitaea persea =

Species of butterfly

Melitaea persea is a butterfly of the family Nymphalidae. It is found from Iran and Asia Minor to Afghanistan and the western parts of the Tian Shan mountains.

== Subspecies ==
- Melitaea persea caucasica Staudinger, 1870
- Melitaea persea dogsoni Grose-Smith, 1887
- Melitaea persea paphlagonia Fruhstorfer, 1917
- Melitaea persea sargon Hemming, 1932 (central Saudi Arabia, Iraq)

For former Melitaea persea montium Belter, 1934 (Syria, Lebanon, Israel) see Melitaea acentria Lukhtanov, 2017
