= Charles Théodore Blachier =

Swiss entomologist

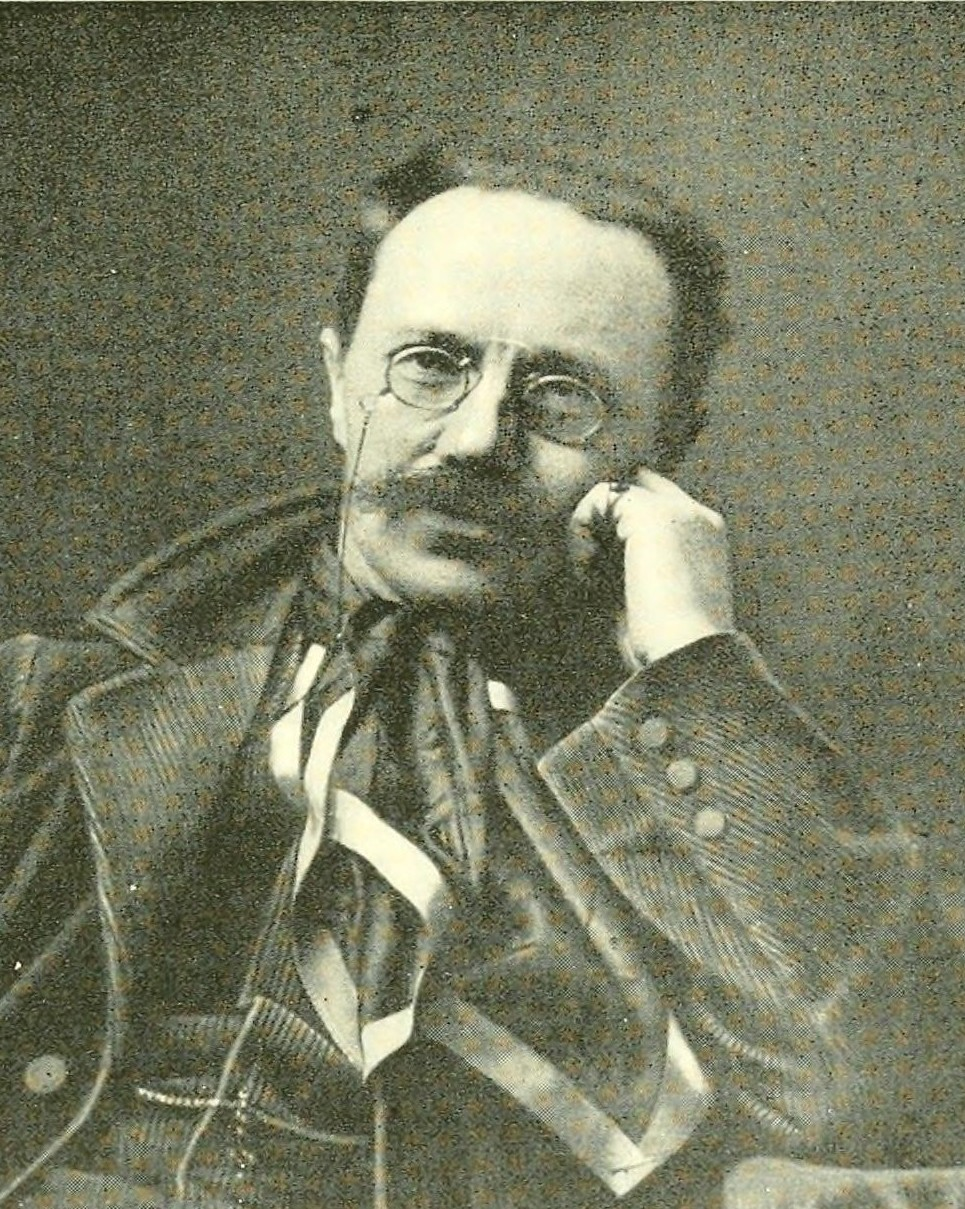
Charles Théodore Blachier

Charles Théodore Blachier (6 February 1859 – 5 October 1915) was a Swiss entomologist who specialised in Lepidoptera.

Blachier was born and died in Geneva. He taught grammar.

He was a member of the Société entomologique de France. His collections of Palearctic Lepidoptera are held by the Natural History Museum of Geneva.

== Works ==
- 1905 Descriptions sommaires d'espèces et de variétés nouvelles de Lépidoptères paléarctiques Bulletin de la Société Entomologique de France 1905: 52-54
- 1905 Descriptions de Lépidoptères nouveaux du Maroc. Bulletin de la Société Entomologique de France:212-215.
- 1908 Lépidoptères du Maroc - Remarque sur diverses espèces et descriptions de variétés nouvelles Ann. Soc. ent. Fr. 77 (2) : 209-222
- 1912 Espèces ou formes nouvelles de Lépidoptères africains appartenant aux genres Acraea et Mylothris. Bulletin de la Société Lépidoptérologique de Genève 2:173-177.
