= Armada maritima =

Scientific classification
- Domain: Eukaryota
- Kingdom: Animalia
- Phylum: Arthropoda
- Class: Insecta
- Order: Lepidoptera
- Superfamily: Noctuoidea
- Family: Noctuidae
- Genus: Armada
- Species: A. maritima

Binomial name
- Armada maritima Brandt, 1939

Species of moth

Armada maritima is a moth of the family Noctuidae first described by Brandt in 1939. It is found in Saudi Arabia, Oman, the United Arab Emirates and Israel.

There are multiple generations per year. Adults are on wing year round except August and September.
