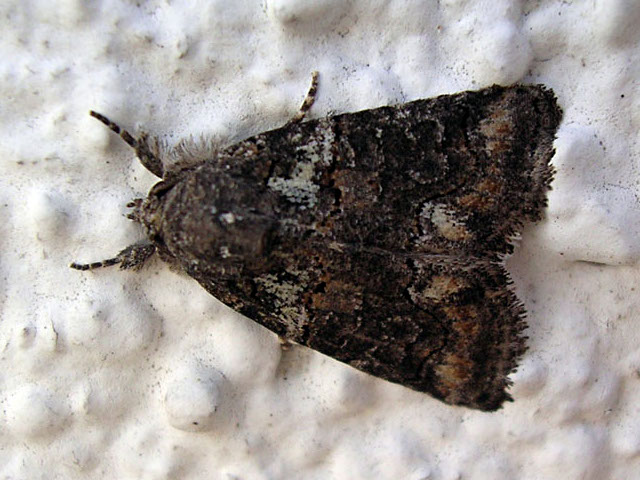
- Bryophila ravula

Scientific classification
- Domain: Eukaryota
- Kingdom: Animalia
- Phylum: Arthropoda
- Class: Insecta
- Order: Lepidoptera
- Superfamily: Noctuoidea
- Family: Noctuidae
- Subfamily: Bryophilinae
- Genus: Bryophila; Treitschke, 1825

Synonyms
- Poecilia Schrank, 1802; Bryoleuca (Acronyctinae) Hampson, 1908; Meroleuca (Acronyctinae) Hampson, 1908; Jugurthia Culot, 1912; Oedibrya Hampson, 1918; Moureia Orfila & Rossi, 1956; Scythobrya Boursin, 1960; Hymenocryphia Boursin, 1968; Transbryoleuca Beck, 1996

= Bryophila =

Genus of moths

Bryophila is a genus of moths of the family Noctuidae. The genus was described by Treitschke in 1825.

== Taxonomy ==
Robert W. Poole (1989) considered Bryophila to be a synonym of Cryphia Hübner, 1818.

== Species ==
Subgenus Scythobrya

- Bryophila maeonis Lederer, 1865 Cyprus, Asia Minor, Turkey, Syria, Lebanon, Palestine, Jordan, Iraq, Iran, Armenia, southern European Russia, Turkmenistan, north-western Kazakhstan, Kirghizstan, Afghanistan
- Bryophila paulina Staudinger, [1892] Syria, Palestine, Egypt, Arabia
- Bryophila eucharista (Boursin, 1960) Iran
- Bryophila occidentalis Osthelder, 1933 Turkey
- Bryophila icterica (Boursin, 1960) Afghanistan
- Bryophila hedygrapha (Boursin, 1963) Afghanistan
- Bryophila ancharista (Boursin, 1970) Pakistan
- Bryophila uzahovi (Ronkay & Herczig, 1991) Caucasus
- Bryophila salomonis (Boursin, 1954) Iran (Elburs)
- Bryophila plumbeola Staudinger, 1881 Syria, western Turkestan
- Bryophila molybdea (Boursin, 1960) Afghanistan
- Bryophila omotoi (Boursin, 1967) Afghanistan
- Bryophila hampsoni Draudt, 1931 northern Alai
- Bryophila duskei Christoph, 1893 Transcaucasus
- Bryophila literata Moore, 1881 Kashmir, Punjab
- Bryophila subliterata Filipjev, 1931 Pamirs
- Bryophila klapperichi (Boursin, 1960) Afghanistan
- Bryophila miltophaea Hampson, 1908 western Turkestan
- Bryophila ochrophaea Hampson, 1908 Kasmir
- Bryophila idonea Christoph, 1893 Turkey, northern Iran
- Bryophila puengeleri Draudt, 1931 China (Xinjiang)
- Bryophila vilis Hampson, 1908 western Turkestan
- Bryophila mongolica Boursin, 1961) Mongolia (eastern Tannuola)
- Bryophila kaszabi Pekarsky, Volynkin & Matov, 2014 western Mongolia

Subgenus Bryoleuca

- Bryophila seladona Christoph, 1885 eastern Turkey, Armenia, Azerbaijan, Georgia, southern European Russia, Ukraine, North Macedonia, northern Greece, Bulgaria, Turkey
- Bryophila raddei (Boursin, 1953) Transcaucasia, north-eastern Turkey, Armenia, north-western Iran
- Bryophila malachitica Ronkay, Fibiger & Steiner, 2009 Caucasus
- Bryophila vandalusiae Duponchel, 1842 south-western Europe, southern France, Corsica, Morocco, Libya, Egypt
- Bryophila thinicola (Hreblay & Ronkay, 1998) Nepal
- Bryophila ravuloides (Boursin, 1954) Kashmir
- Bryophila rectilinea (Warren, 1909) Italy, south-eastern Europe, Asia Minor, Syria, Lebanon, Israel, Iraq
- Bryophila amseli (Boursin, 1952) Israel
- Bryophila microphysa (Boursin, 1952) Cyprus
- Bryophila tephrocharis (Boursin, 1954) south-eastern Europe, Turkey, Iran, Lebanon, Israel, Jordan, Cyprus
- Bryophila ravula (Hübner, [1813]) France, Switzerland, southern Germany, northern Africa, south-western Europe
- Bryophila rueckbeili (Boursin, 1953) Turkestan
- Bryophila ereptricula Treitschke, 1825 Europe
- Bryophila galathea Millière, 1875 southern France
- Bryophila amoenissima Turati, 1909 Italy
- Bryophila petricolor Lederer, 1870 northern Greece, Transcaucasus, Armenia, northern Iran
- Bryophila pittawayi (Wiltshire, 1986) Arabia
- Bryophila harithya (Wiltshire, 1990)
- Bryophila remanei (Heydemann & Schulte, 1963) Iraq
- Bryophila labecula Lederer, 1855 Syria
- Bryophila thamanaea Hampson, 1908 Iran
- Bryophila raptricula (Denis & Schiffermüller, 1775) northern Africa, EU, Near East, Central Asia, Korea
- Bryophila felina (Eversmann, 1852) Armenia, Turkestan
- Bryophila pljushtchi (Pekarsky, 2015) Afghanistan
- Bryophila volodia (An, Choi & Ronkay, 2013) Vietnam
- Bryophila nahnybidai (Pekarsky, 2014)
- Bryophila protracta Christoph, 1893 Turkey
- Bryophila diehli (Boursin, 1960) Saudi Arabia
- Bryophila omega (Gyulai & Ronkay, 2001) Qinghai
- Bryophila zeta (Plante, 1989)
- Bryophila orthogramma (Boursin, 1954) Turkestan, Ukraine, Moldova, Bulgaria, Serbia, Kosovo, south-eastern Siberia, Korea, Japan
- Bryophila gea (Boursin, 1954) Algeria, Morocco, Spain
- Bryophila hannemanni (Boursin, 1961) Margelan
- Bryophila eucta Hampson, 1908 northern Iran, western Turkestan
- Bryophila argentacea Bytinski-Salz & Brandt, 1937 Iran
- Bryophila ovchi (Pekarsky, 2019) Tajikistan

Subgenus Moureia

- Bryophila microglossa (Rambur, 1858) Algeria, Spain, Syria
- Bryophila petrea Guenée, 1852 south-western Europe, southern France, Corsica, Greece, Kurdistan, Asia Minor, Syria, Jordan, Lebanon, Palestine, Iraq, Cyprus

Subgenus Bryophila

- Bryophila domestica (Hufnagel, 1766) southern Europe, France, southern Sweden, Germany, Poland, Austria, Switzerland, Hungary, Romania, Bulgaria
- Bryophila diachorisma (Boursin, 1960) Afghanistan
- Bryophila gigantea (Boursin, 1960) Afghanistan
- Bryophila orocharis Boursin, 1944 western Himalayas
- Bryophila eberti (Boursin, 1961) Afghanistan
- Bryophila albimixta Sugi, 1980 Korea, Japan
- Bryophila granitalis (Butler, 1881) Korea, Japan
- Bryophila herczigi (Hreblay & Ronkay, 2000) Taiwan
- Bryophila barbaria (Schawerda, 1934) Morocco
- Bryophila schwingenschussi (Boursin, 1954) Algeria
- Bryophila blepharista (Boursin, 1954) Morocco
- Bryophila aerumna Culot, 1912 Algeria
- Bryophila duseutrei Oberthür, 1922 Morocco

Subgenus Hymenocryphia

- Bryophila modesta Moore, 1881 Punjab
- Bryophila pulverosa (Warren, 1909) Kashmir
- Bryophila pelidna (Boursin, 1967) Afghanistan
- Bryophila cyanea (Boursin, 1969) India (Unies)
- Bryophila subcyanea (Hreblay & Ronkay, 1999) Nepal
- Bryophila beigli (Hacker, 1990)
- Bryophila canosparsa Draudt, 1950 Yunnan
- Bryophila wiltshirei (Boursin, 1954) Kashmir
- Bryophila strobinoi (Dujardin, 1972) Greece
- Bryophila altivolans (Hacker, 1990)
- Bryophila pulverulenta Boursin, 1944 western Himalayas
- Bryophila kautti (Hacker, 1996)
- Bryophila testouti Boursin, 1944 western Yunnan
