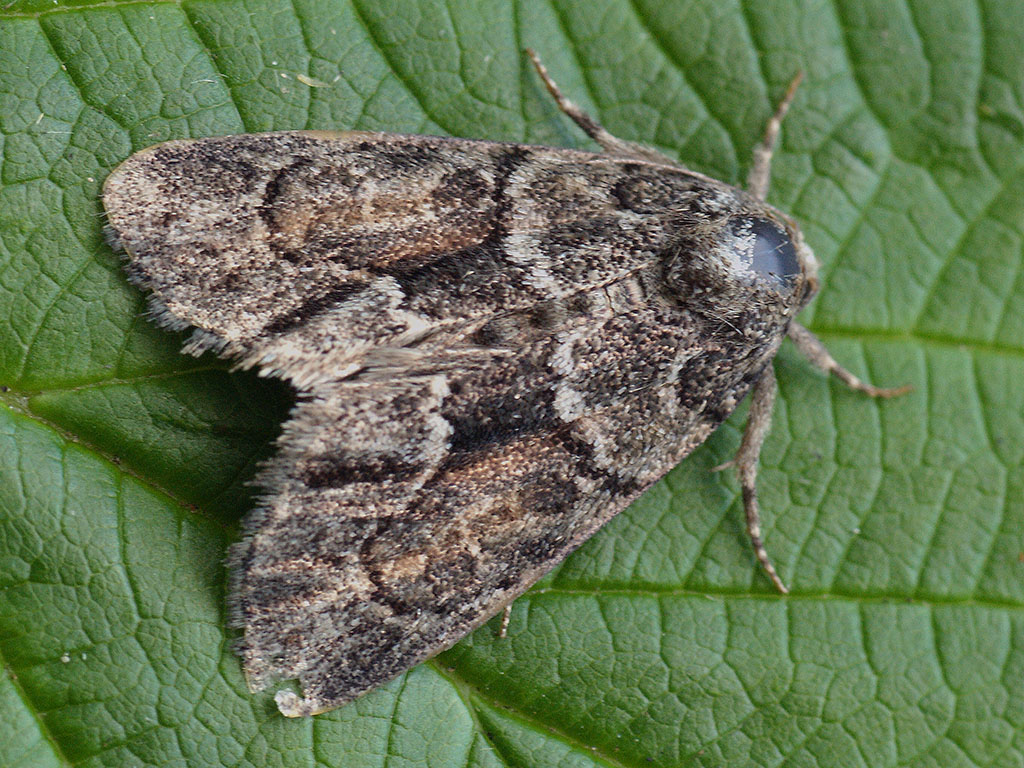

Scientific classification
- Kingdom: Animalia
- Phylum: Arthropoda
- Clade: Pancrustacea
- Class: Insecta
- Order: Lepidoptera
- Superfamily: Noctuoidea
- Family: Noctuidae
- Genus: Cryphia
- Species: C. fraudatricula

Binomial name
- Cryphia fraudatricula (Hubner, 1803)

= Cryphia fraudatricula =

Species of moth

Cryphia fraudatricula is a species of moth belonging to the family Noctuidae.

== Description ==
Warren (1914) states M. fraudatricula Hbn.Forewing browner grey than Cryphia raptricula the lines black, conversely white-edged: the inner curved more vertically, connected with the outer by a thick black streak on sub-median fold . followed by another beyond outer line; stigmata slightly darker than the ground; hindwing dark grey. Widely spread throughout Europe. — The ab. simulatricula Guen., (now species Cryphia simulatricula (Guenée, 1852) ) queried from Florence by the author but referred by Staudinger to Castile and Aragon, is greyer, with the hindwing paler: the description is considerably like that of andalusiae (Duponchel) (now Bryophila ravula).

It is native to Southern Europe.
