= Gloanna =

Scientific classification
- Domain: Eukaryota
- Kingdom: Animalia
- Phylum: Arthropoda
- Class: Insecta
- Order: Lepidoptera
- Superfamily: Noctuoidea
- Family: Noctuidae
- Subfamily: Bryophilinae
- Genus: Gloanna; Nye, 1975

Synonyms
- Langona Barnes & Lindsey, 1921

Genus of moths

Gloanna is a genus of moths of the family Noctuidae. The genus was described by Nye in 1975.

== Species ==
- Gloanna grisescens (Barnes & Lindsey, 1921)
- Gloanna hecate Blanchard & Knudson, 1983
- Gloanna mexicana (Dyar, 1912)
