= Gloanna hecate =

Scientific classification
- Domain: Eukaryota
- Kingdom: Animalia
- Phylum: Arthropoda
- Class: Insecta
- Order: Lepidoptera
- Superfamily: Noctuoidea
- Family: Noctuidae
- Subfamily: Bryophilinae
- Genus: Gloanna
- Species: G. hecate

Binomial name
- Gloanna hecate A. Blanchard & Knudson, 1983

Species of moth

Gloanna hecate is a species of moth in the family Noctuidae (the owlet moths). It is found in North America.

The MONA or Hodges number for Gloanna hecate is 9844.1.
