= Moureia =

Scientific classification
- Domain: Eukaryota
- Kingdom: Animalia
- Phylum: Arthropoda
- Class: Insecta
- Order: Lepidoptera
- Superfamily: Noctuoidea
- Family: Noctuidae
- Subfamily: Acronictinae
- Genus: Moureia; Orfila & Rossi, 1956

Genus of moths

Moureia was erected as a moth genus by Ricardo N. Orfila and Nelida H. Rosisi in 1956. It is now considered by Butterflies and Moths of the World to be a synonym of Victrix Staudinger, 1879 and by Lepidoptera and Some Other Life Forms and The Global Lepidoptera Names Index to be a synonym of Bryophila Treitschke, 1825.
