= Cuerva (disambiguation) =

Cuerva is a municipality in Spain. Cuerva may also refer to

- Jorge Ignacio García Cuerva (born 1968), Argentine prelate of the Catholic Church
- Gil Cuerva (born 1995), Filipino-Spanish actor and model
- Cryphia cuerva, a moth of the family Noctuidae

== See also ==
- Luis Cuervas (1932–2002), Spanish businessman and sports leader
