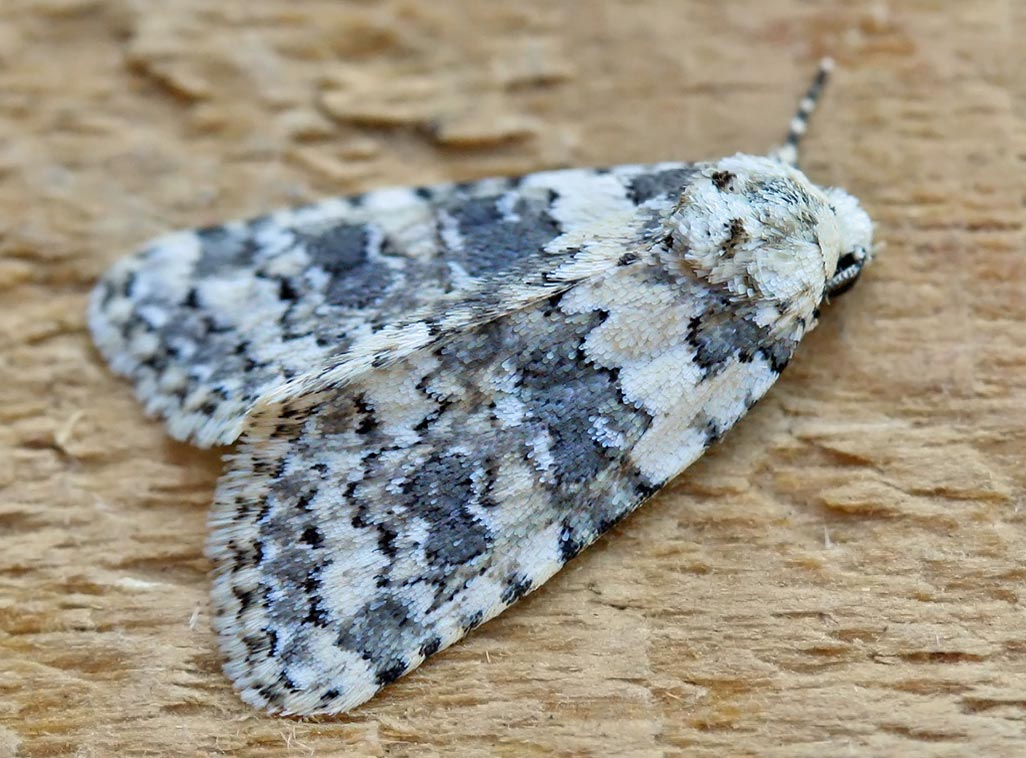
- Cryphia domestica

Scientific classification
- Kingdom: Animalia
- Phylum: Arthropoda
- Clade: Pancrustacea
- Class: Insecta
- Order: Lepidoptera
- Superfamily: Noctuoidea
- Family: Noctuidae
- Subfamily: Bryophilinae
- Genus: Cryphia; Hübner, 1818

Synonyms
- Bryoleuca Hampson, 1908; Bryophila Treitschke, 1825; Bryopsis Boursin, 1970; Euthales Hübner, 1820; Hymenocryphia Boursin, 1967; Jaspidia Hübner, 1822; Nyctobrya Boursin, 1957; Scythobrya Boursin, 1960; Heterocryphia Beck, 1996

= Cryphia =

Genus of moths

Cryphia is a genus of moths of the family Noctuidae. The genus was erected by Jacob Hübner in 1818.

== Description ==
Palpi slender and upturned, where the third joint reaching above vertex of head. Antennae minutely ciliated (hairy). Thorax with slight tufts behind collar. Abdomen with slight dorsal tufts, and longer than the hindwing. Larva with four pairs of abdominal prolegs.

== Species ==
- Cryphia albipuncta (Barnes & McDunnough, 1910)
- Cryphia algae (Fabricius, 1775) – tree-lichen beauty
- Cryphia amasina (Draudt, 1931)
- Cryphia amseli Boursin, 1952
- Cryphia amygdalina Boursin, 1963
- Cryphia cuerva (Barnes, 1907)
- Cryphia domestica (Hufnagel, 1766) – marbled beauty
- Cryphia ereptricula (Treitschke, 1825)
- Cryphia fascia (Smith, [1904])
- Cryphia flavidior (Barnes & McDunnough, 1911)
- Cryphia flavipuncta Mustelin, 2006
- Cryphia fraudatricula (Hübner, [1803])
- Cryphia gea Boursin, 1954
- Cryphia labecula (Lederer, 1855)
- Cryphia merhaba Hacker & Fibiger, 2006
- Cryphia moeonis (Lederer, 1865)
- Cryphia muralis (Forster, 1771) – marbled green
- Cryphia nana (Barnes & McDunnough, 1911)
- Cryphia oaklandiae (Barnes & McDunnough, 1911)
- Cryphia ochsi (Boursin, 1940)
- Cryphia olivacea (Smith, 1891)
- Cryphia orthogramma Boursin, 1954
- Cryphia pallidioides Poole, 1989
- Cryphia paulina (Staudinger, 1892)
- Cryphia petrea (Guenée, 1852)
- Cryphia petricolor (Lederer, 1869)
- Cryphia postochrea (Hampson, 1893)
- Cryphia raptricula (Denis & Schiffermüller, 1775) – marbled gray
- Cryphia ravula (Hübner, [1813])
- Cryphia receptricula (Hübner, [1803])
- Cryphia rectilinea (Warren, 1909)
- Cryphia sarepta (Barnes, 1907)
- Cryphia seladonia (Christoph, 1885)
- Cryphia simulatricula (Guenée, 1852)
- Cryphia strobinoi Dujardin, 1972
- Cryphia tephrocharis Boursin, 1954
- Cryphia vandalusiae (Duponchel, 1842)

== Former species ==
- Cryphia viridata is now Bryolymnia viridata (Harvey, 1876)
