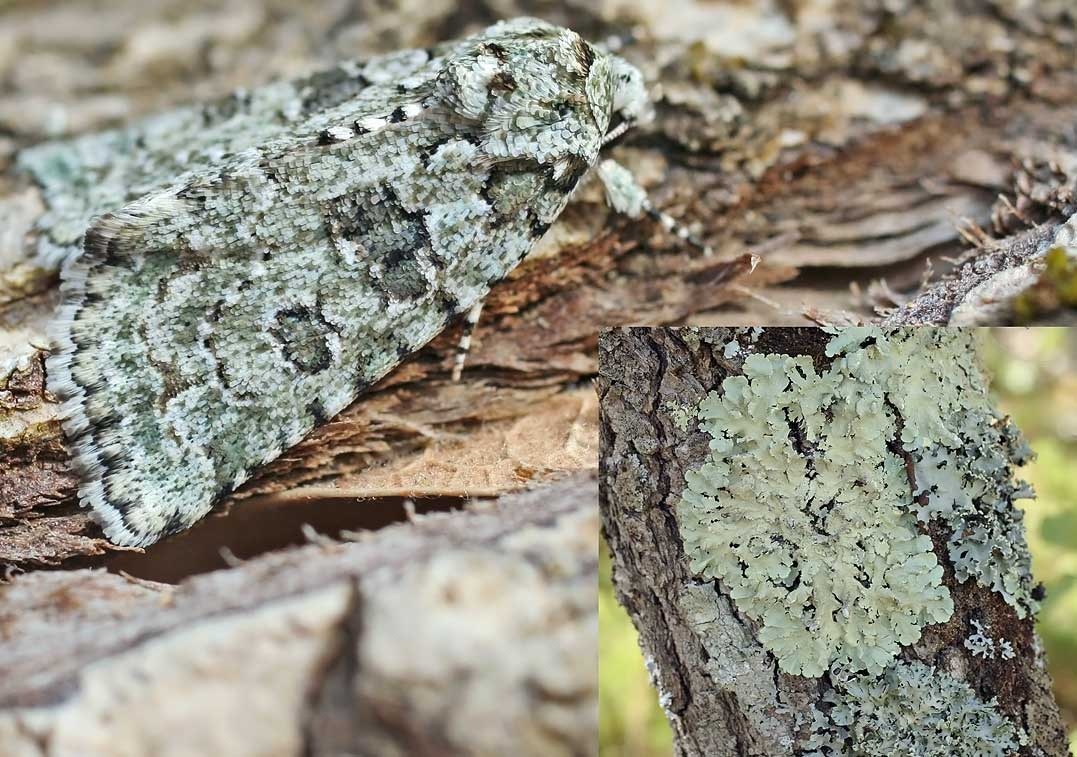

Scientific classification
- Kingdom: Animalia
- Phylum: Arthropoda
- Clade: Pancrustacea
- Class: Insecta
- Order: Lepidoptera
- Superfamily: Noctuoidea
- Family: Noctuidae
- Subfamily: Bryophilinae; Guenée, 1852

= Bryophilinae =

Subfamily of moths

Bryophilinae is a subfamily of moths in the family Noctuidae. The subfamily was erected by Achille Guenée in 1852.

== Genera ==
- Acopa Harvey, 1875
- Athaumasta Hampson, 1906
- Bryolymnia Hampson, 1908
- Bryomoia Staudinger, 1892
- Bryonycta Boursin, 1955
- Bryophila Treitschke, 1825
- Cryphia Hübner, 1818
- Nyctobrya Boursin, 1957
- Stenoloba Staudinger, 1892
- Victrix Staudinger, 1879
