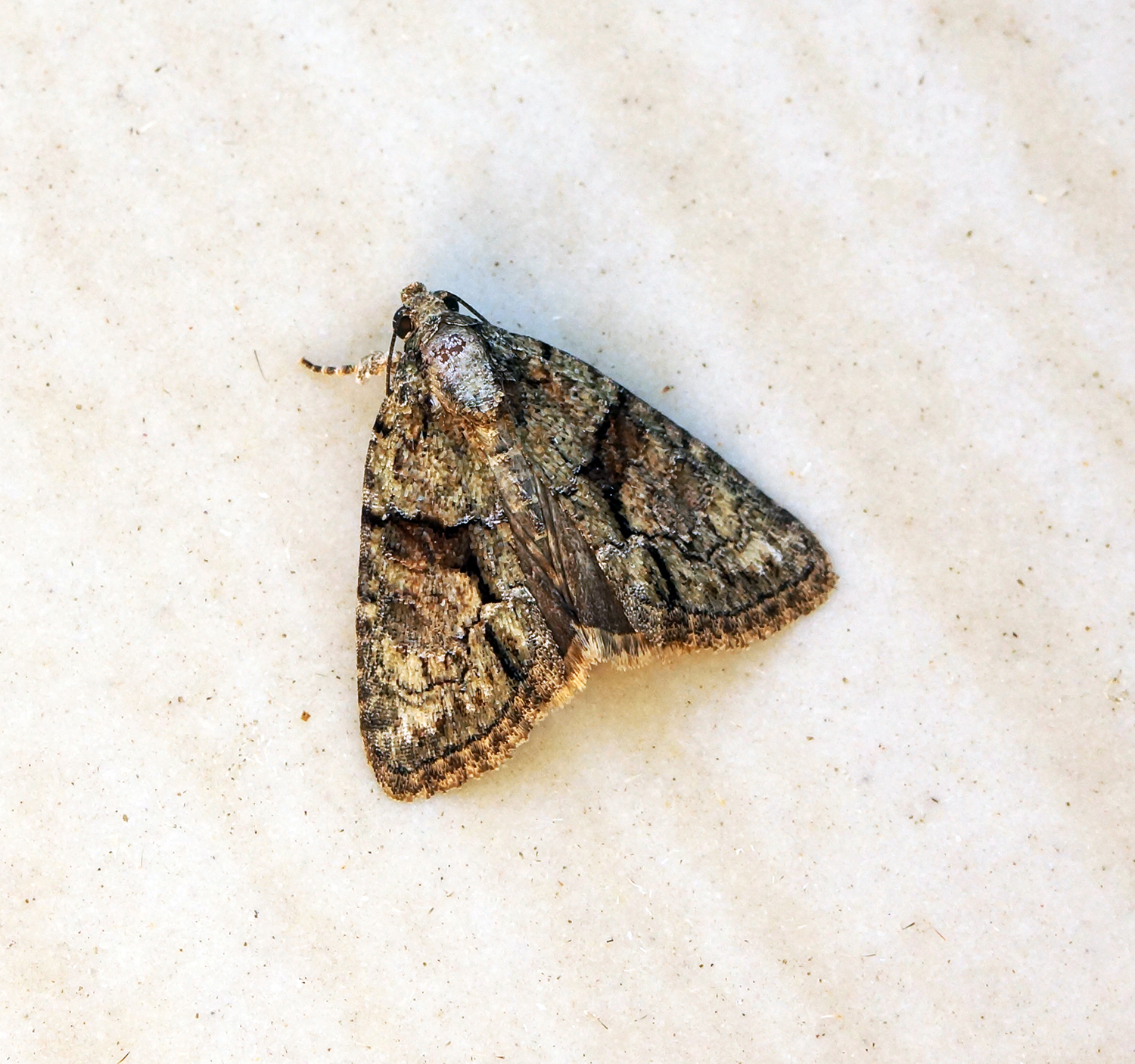

Scientific classification
- Domain: Eukaryota
- Kingdom: Animalia
- Phylum: Arthropoda
- Class: Insecta
- Order: Lepidoptera
- Superfamily: Noctuoidea
- Family: Noctuidae
- Genus: Cryphia
- Species: C. ochsi

Binomial name
- Cryphia ochsi (Boursin, 1940)

Synonyms
- Bryophila ochsi Boursin, 1940

= Cryphia ochsi =

Species of moth

Cryphia ochsi is a moth of the family Noctuidae. It is found in the Central and Eastern part of the Mediterranean Basin. In the Levant it has been recorded from Lebanon and Israel.

Adults are on wing from May to August. There is one generation per year.

The larvae feed on Acer negundo, Arbutus andrachne, Cotoneaster franchetii, Elaeagnus pungens, Morus alba, Pinus halepensis, Pistacia atlantica and Pyracantha species.
