= Cryphia amasina =

Scientific classification
- Domain: Eukaryota
- Kingdom: Animalia
- Phylum: Arthropoda
- Class: Insecta
- Order: Lepidoptera
- Superfamily: Noctuoidea
- Family: Noctuidae
- Genus: Cryphia
- Species: C. amasina

Binomial name
- Cryphia amasina (Draudt, 1931)

Synonyms
- Bryophila muralis amasina Draudt, 1931

Species of moth

Cryphia amasina is a moth of the family Noctuidae. It is found from Near East and Middle East to Turkmenistan and the Arabian Peninsula. In the Levant there are fragmented populations in Lebanon, Jordan and Israel.

Adults are on wing from July to October. There is one generation per year.

The larvae probably feed on lichen.
