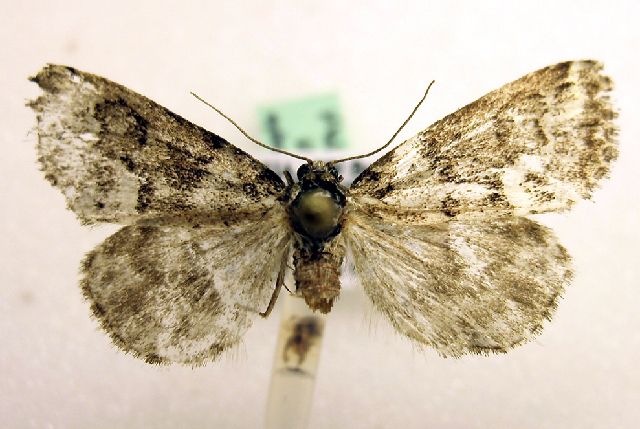

Scientific classification
- Domain: Eukaryota
- Kingdom: Animalia
- Phylum: Arthropoda
- Class: Insecta
- Order: Lepidoptera
- Superfamily: Noctuoidea
- Family: Noctuidae
- Genus: Victrix
- Species: V. umovii

Binomial name
- Victrix umovii (Eversmann, 1846)

Synonyms
- Bryophila umovii Eversmann, 1846; Poliobrya umovii

= Victrix umovii =

Species of moth

Victrix umovii is a moth of the family Noctuidae. It is found from Fennoscandia south to Poland, Ukraine and Moldova and east to Russia.

The wingspan is 29–31 mm.

The larvae feed on Alectoria sarmentosa.
