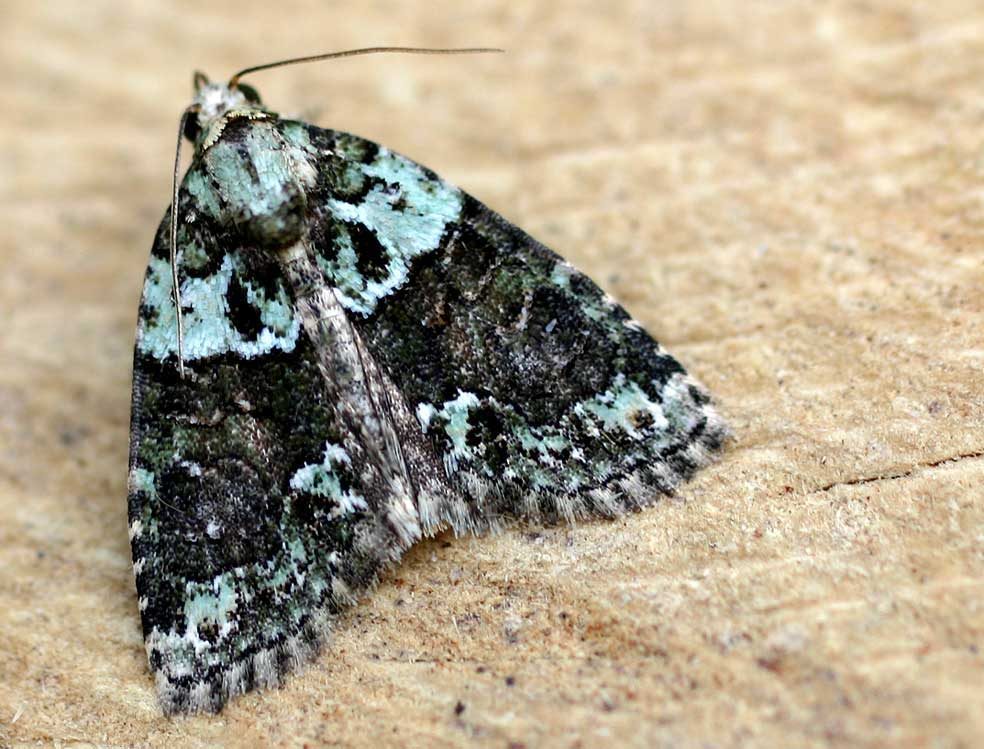

Scientific classification
- Domain: Eukaryota
- Kingdom: Animalia
- Phylum: Arthropoda
- Class: Insecta
- Order: Lepidoptera
- Superfamily: Noctuoidea
- Family: Noctuidae
- Genus: Cryphia
- Species: C. algae

Binomial name
- Cryphia algae (Fabricius, 1775)

Synonyms
- Noctua algae Fabricius, 1775; Phalaena algae Fabricius, 1775; Bryophila algae (Fabricius, 1775); Metachrostis algae (Fabricius, 1775); Euthales algae (Fabricius, 1775); Noctua degener [Denis & Schiffermüller], 1775; Noctua spoliatricula [Denis & Schiffermüller], 1775; Phalaena Noctua calligrapha Borkhausen, 1792; Phalaena Noctua chloris Borkhausen, 1792; Noctua mendacula Hübner, [1813]

= Cryphia algae =

Species of moth

Cryphia algae, the tree-lichen beauty, is a moth of the family Noctuidae. The genus was erected by Johan Christian Fabricius in 1775. It is found in Mediterranean parts of Europe and the Near East.

== Technical description and variation ==
M. algae F. (= spoliatricula Hbn) (4e). Forewing with basal area wholly, and marginal partly, pale green, marked with black; lines black, placed as in ravula; the median space brownish; some dark marks along the course of submarginal line; hindwing dull grey — ab. degener Esp. (4e) is more unicolorous, the pale green clouded with grey; a dark band beyond inner line. — In ab. mendacula Hbn. (4e) the whole forewing is varied with pale and dark scales intermixed. — ab. calligrapha Bkh. (4e) is a remarkably pretty aberration, in which the basal and marginal areas are more or less filled with lichen-yellow. Larva grey, bluish at the sides, with a dark grey dorsal line. The wingspan is 24–30 mm. The length of the forewings is 10–13 mm.

The moth flies from July to September depending on the location.

The larvae feed on various tree lichen species.
