= Cryphia labecula =

Scientific classification
- Domain: Eukaryota
- Kingdom: Animalia
- Phylum: Arthropoda
- Class: Insecta
- Order: Lepidoptera
- Superfamily: Noctuoidea
- Family: Noctuidae
- Genus: Cryphia
- Species: C. labecula

Binomial name
- Cryphia labecula (Lederer, 1855)

Species of moth

Cryphia labecula is a moth of the family Noctuidae. It is found in the Lebanon mountain range the adjacent southern part of Turkey and Mount Hermon in the Golan Heights.

Adults are on wing from May to June. There is probably one generation per year.

The larvae feed on lichen from old trees.
