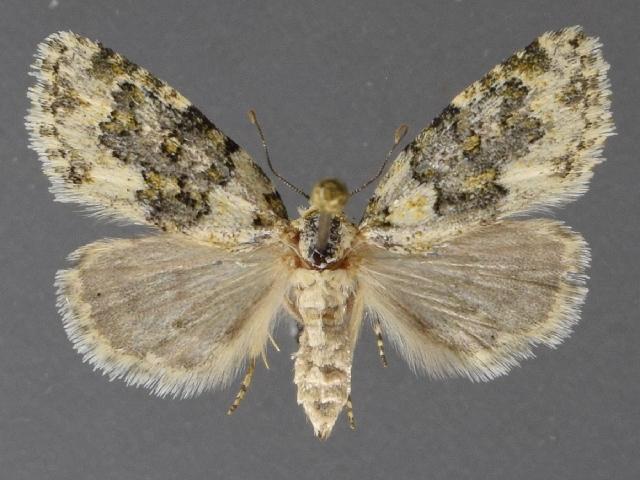

Scientific classification
- Domain: Eukaryota
- Kingdom: Animalia
- Phylum: Arthropoda
- Class: Insecta
- Order: Lepidoptera
- Superfamily: Noctuoidea
- Family: Noctuidae
- Genus: Cryphia
- Species: C. fascia

Binomial name
- Cryphia fascia (Smith, 1903)

= Cryphia fascia =

Species of moth

Cryphia fascia is a species of moth in the family Noctuidae (the owlet moths).

The MONA or Hodges number for Cryphia fascia is 9288.
