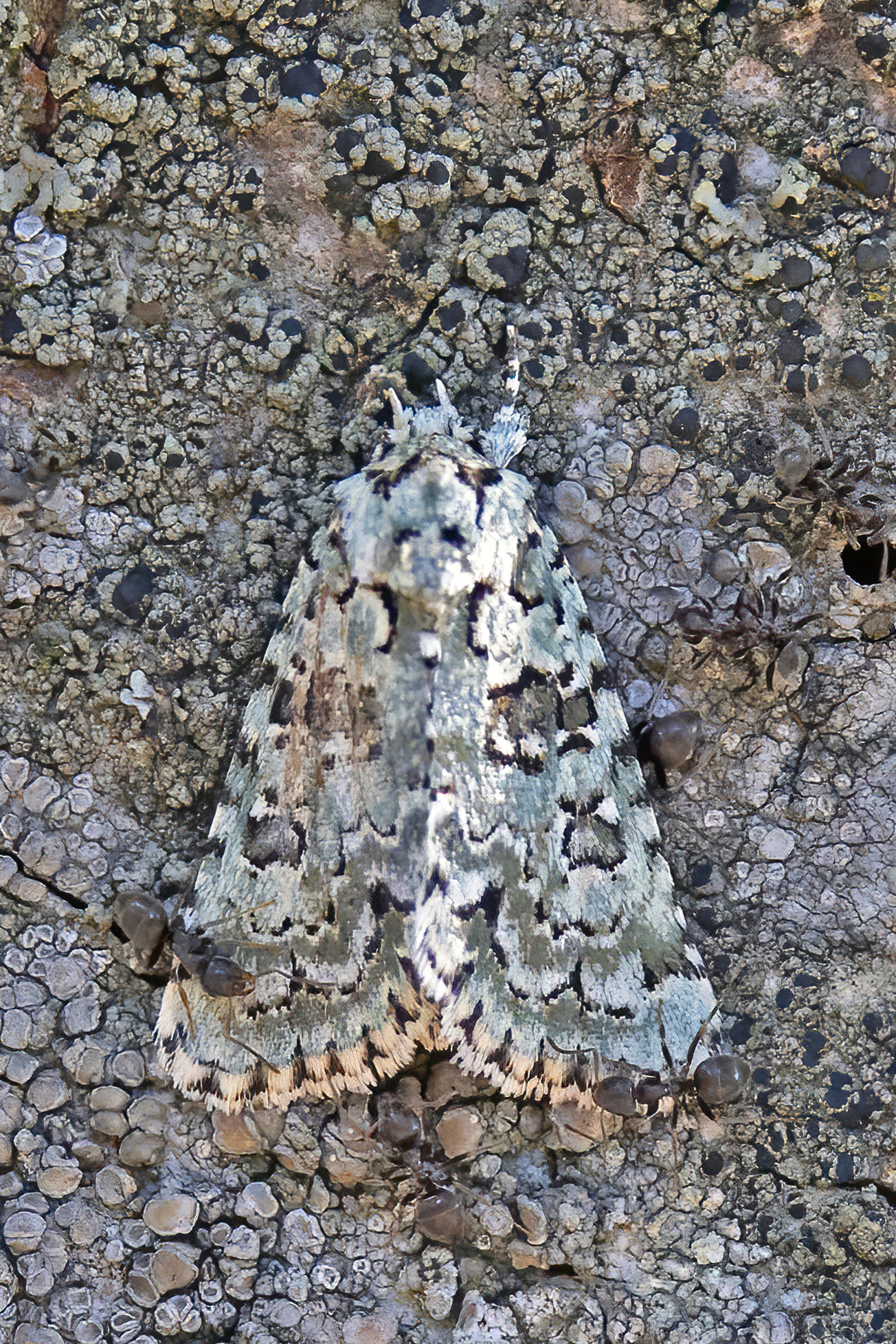
- Dobruja, Romania

Scientific classification
- Kingdom: Animalia
- Phylum: Arthropoda
- Clade: Pancrustacea
- Class: Insecta
- Order: Lepidoptera
- Superfamily: Noctuoidea
- Family: Noctuidae
- Genus: Cryphia
- Species: C. muralis

Binomial name
- Cryphia muralis (Forster, 1771)

Synonyms
- Nyctobrya muralis (Forster, 1771)

= Marbled green =

Species of moth

The marbled green (Cryphia muralis) is a moth of the family Noctuidae. The species was first described by Johann Reinhold Forster in 1771. It is found in Europe. Its wings are white with several shades of green. However, the green fades.

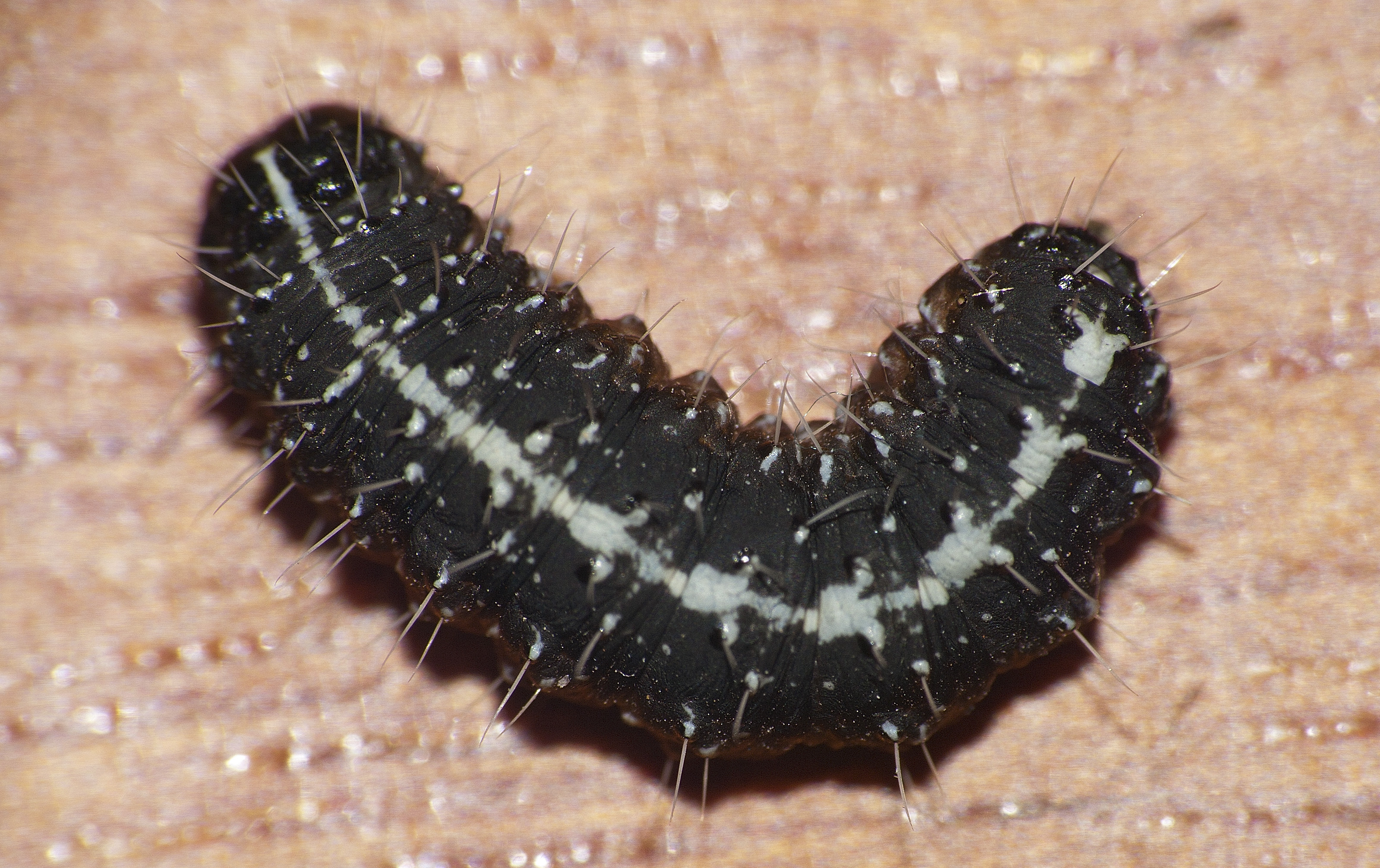
Larva

== Technical description and variation ==
The wingspan is 27–34 mm. The length of the forewings is 12–15 mm. Forewing smooth, unspeckled green, the markings black and prominent: the claviform (club-shaped) and orbicular (round) stigmata coalescing to form a blotch; ab. par Hbn. is grey green, with darker green dusting; the black markings obsolete. — ab. impar Warr. is green dusted with black or rufous; the lines more or less obsolete: the green colour fades more quickly than in typical muralis; this form occurs only at Cambridge, where the type form is nonexistent. Four further aberrations have been differentiated; ab. viridis Tutt, rich green, without black or grey dusting; ab. flavescens Tutt, like the type, but with the green changed to yellow, even in bred specimens; ab. pallida Tutt, with typical markings on a whitish-grey ground colour; and ab. obscura Tutt, dull brownish grey, with the markings obscured and without any trace of green; all these forms are found on the coast of Kent and at Queenstown in Ireland.

== Biology ==
The moth flies from June to September depending on the location.

Larva dark grey with a greenish tinge: dorsal line broadly white, sometimes interrupted; a pale line above feet. greenish tinge: dorsal line broadly white, sometimes interrupted; a pale line above feet. The larvae feed on various lichen.
