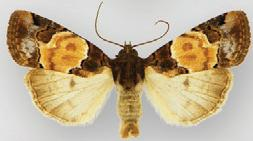
- Male
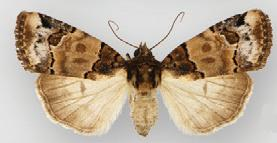
- Female

Scientific classification
- Domain: Eukaryota
- Kingdom: Animalia
- Phylum: Arthropoda
- Class: Insecta
- Order: Lepidoptera
- Superfamily: Noctuoidea
- Family: Noctuidae
- Genus: Bryolymnia
- Species: B. biformata

Binomial name
- Bryolymnia biformata Lafontaine & Walsh, 2010

= Bryolymnia biformata =

Species of moth

Bryolymnia biformata is a moth of the family Noctuidae first described by Donald Lafontaine and J. Walsh in 2010. It is known only from the Huachuca, Patagonia, and Santa Rita Mountains in south-eastern Arizona.

The length of the forewings is 11–12 mm. Adults have been collected between mid-June and late July.

== Etymology ==
The specific name biformata is from Latin and refers to the two color forms of this species.
