= Victrix marginelota =

Scientific classification
- Domain: Eukaryota
- Kingdom: Animalia
- Phylum: Arthropoda
- Class: Insecta
- Order: Lepidoptera
- Superfamily: Noctuoidea
- Family: Noctuidae
- Genus: Victrix
- Species: V. marginelota

Binomial name
- Victrix marginelota (de Joannis, 1888)

Species of moth

Victrix marginelota is a moth of the family Noctuidae. It is endemic to Lebanon and Israel.

Adults are on wing from August to October. There is one generation per year.
