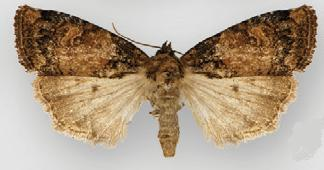
- Female

Scientific classification
- Domain: Eukaryota
- Kingdom: Animalia
- Phylum: Arthropoda
- Class: Insecta
- Order: Lepidoptera
- Superfamily: Noctuoidea
- Family: Noctuidae
- Genus: Bryolymnia
- Species: B. ensina

Binomial name
- Bryolymnia ensina (Barnes, 1907)

Synonyms
- Oligia ensina Barnes, 1907; Elaphria ensina (Barnes, 1907); Calymniodes obliquirena Hampson 1918

= Bryolymnia ensina =

Species of moth

Bryolymnia ensina is a moth of the family Noctuidae first described by William Barnes in 1907. It occurs in coniferous forests from south-eastern Arizona (Huachuca Mountains) and south-western New Mexico (Pinos Altos Mountains) southward in the Sierra Madre Occidental to the state of Durango in Mexico.

The length of the forewings is 12–14 mm and the wingspan is 25–30 mm. Adults are on wing from mid-June to mid-July.
