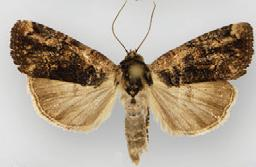
- Male

Scientific classification
- Domain: Eukaryota
- Kingdom: Animalia
- Phylum: Arthropoda
- Class: Insecta
- Order: Lepidoptera
- Superfamily: Noctuoidea
- Family: Noctuidae
- Genus: Bryolymnia
- Species: B. mixta

Binomial name
- Bryolymnia mixta Lafontaine & Walsh, 2010

= Bryolymnia mixta =

Species of moth

Bryolymnia mixta is a moth of the family Noctuidae first described by Donald Lafontaine and J. Walsh in 2010. It is known only from the Patagonia Mountains in south-eastern Arizona.

The length of the forewings is about 12 mm. Adults were collected in late June and mid-July.
