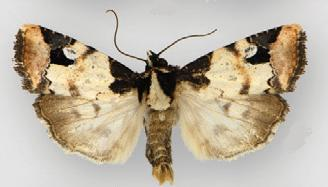
- Male
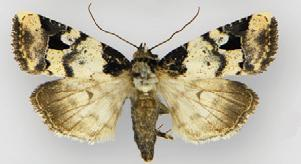
- Female

Scientific classification
- Domain: Eukaryota
- Kingdom: Animalia
- Phylum: Arthropoda
- Class: Insecta
- Order: Lepidoptera
- Superfamily: Noctuoidea
- Family: Noctuidae
- Genus: Bryolymnia
- Species: B. poasia

Binomial name
- Bryolymnia poasia Schaus, 1911

= Bryolymnia poasia =

Species of moth

Bryolymnia poasia is a moth of the family Noctuidae first described by William Schaus in 1911. It is found in Costa Rica.

The length of the forewings is 12–14 mm.
