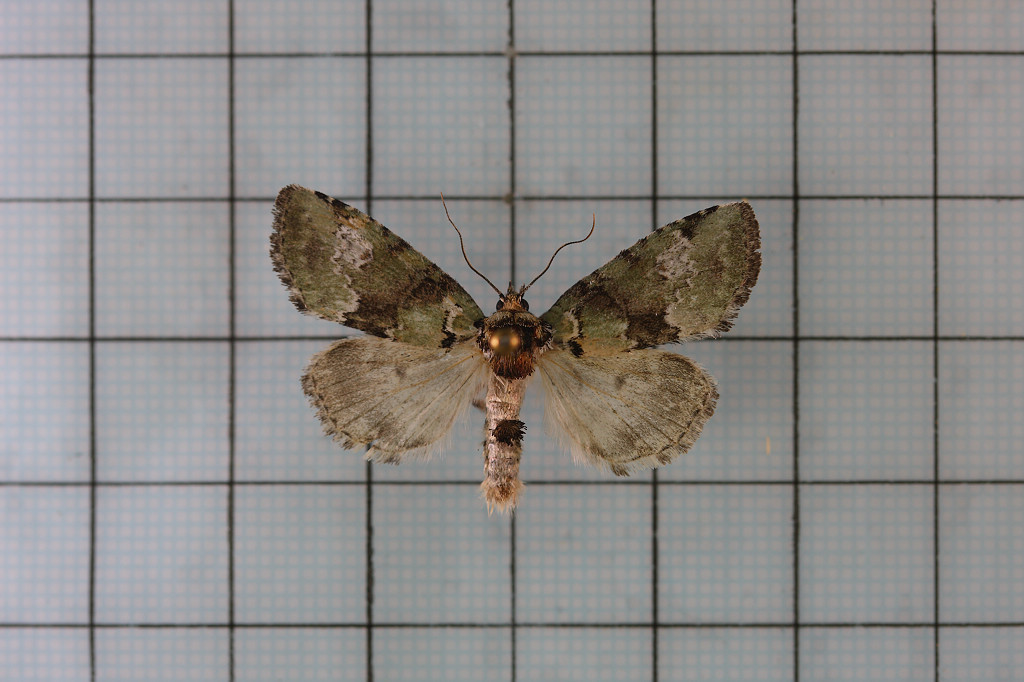

Scientific classification
- Domain: Eukaryota
- Kingdom: Animalia
- Phylum: Arthropoda
- Class: Insecta
- Order: Lepidoptera
- Superfamily: Noctuoidea
- Family: Noctuidae
- Genus: Stenoloba
- Species: S. olivacea

Binomial name
- Stenoloba olivacea (Wileman, 1914)

Synonyms
- Chytonidia olivacea Wileman, 1914; Conicochyta olivacea

= Stenoloba olivacea =

Species of moth

Stenoloba olivacea is a species of moth of the family Noctuidae. It is found in Taiwan.

The wingspan is 31–37 mm.
