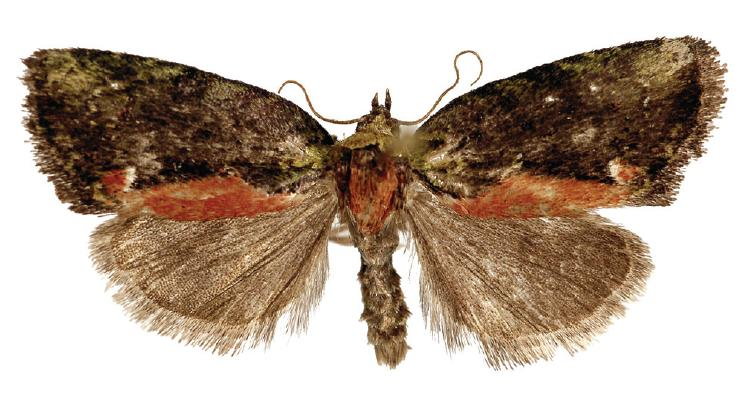
- Male Stenoloba viridicollar

Scientific classification
- Kingdom: Animalia
- Phylum: Arthropoda
- Class: Insecta
- Order: Lepidoptera
- Superfamily: Noctuoidea
- Family: Noctuidae
- Subfamily: Bryophilinae
- Genus: Stenoloba; Staudinger, 1892

Synonyms
- Neothripa Hampson, 1894; Lepidopyrga Warren, 1914; Conicochyta Hampson, 1918

= Stenoloba =

Genus of moths

Stenoloba is an East Asian genus of moths of the family Noctuidae. The genus was described by Staudinger in 1892.

== Taxonomy ==
It was included in the subfamily Acontiinae by early authors until Shigero Sugi revised the Japanese species of the genus and established its position in the Bryophilinae in 1970.

== Diversity ==
The genus presently includes about 100 species that are arranged in 23 species groups.

== Species ==
jankowskii species group

- Stenoloba jankowskii (Oberthür, 1884) Primorye, Korea, Japan, north-eastern China
- Stenoloba marina Draudt, 1950 China (Zhejiang, Hunan, Sichuan)
- Stenoloba marinela Han, Kononenko & Behounek, 2011 Yunnan
- Stenoloba assimilis (Warren, 1909) Korea, Japan
- Stenoloba assimilina Han & Kononenko, 2018 south-western China (Xizang)
- Stenoloba lampra Kononenko & Ronkay, 2000 northern Vietnam

ochraceola species group

- Stenoloba ochraceola Han & Kononenko, 2018 Yunnan

manleyi species group

- Stenoloba manleyi (Leech, 1889) Japan
- Stenoloba yunley Han & Kononenko, 2009 Yunnan
- Stenoloba viridibasis Han & Kononenko, 2009 Yunnan
- Stenoloba pontezi Saldaitis & Volynkin, 2020 Yunnan
- Stenoloba likianga Kononenko & Ronkay, 2000 Yunnan
- Stenoloba bachmana Kononenko & Ronkay, 2000 northern Vietnam
- Stenoloba pulla Ronkay, 2001 Taiwan, Yunnan, northern Vietnam
- Stenoloba liuii Chen, 1999 Hainan
- Stenoloba ronkayi Behounek & Kononenko, 2010 northern Vietnam
- Stenoloba gaoligonga Han & Kononenko, 2018 Yunnan

huanxipoa species group

- Stenoloba huanxipoa Han & Kononenko, 2018 Yunnan
- Stenoloba chlorobrunnea Han & Kononenko, 2018 south-western China (Xizang)

clara species group

- Stenoloba clara (Leech, 1889) Japan, Korea, central China
- Stenoloba clarescens Kononenko & Ronkay, 2000 Taiwan

oculata species group

- Stenoloba albiangulata (Mell, 1943) China (Guangdong, Jiangxi), northern Vietnam
- Stenoloba oculata Draudt, 1950 eastern China, central China, ..., Japan, Korea
- Stenoloba oculatoides Han & Kononenko, 2018 Yunnan
- Stenoloba brunnescens Kononenko & Ronkay, 2000 northern Vietnam, Yunnan
- Stenoloba plumbeoviridis Han & Kononenko, 2018 Yunnan
- Stenoloba plumbeobrunnea Han & Kononenko, 2018 Yunnan
- Stenoloba cucullata Han & Kononenko, 2018 Yunnan
- Stenoloba yenminia Ronkay, 2001 Taiwan
- Stenoloba qingchenga Pekarsky, 2018 China (Guangdong, Sichuan), northern Vietnam
- Stenoloba leonie Pekarsky, 2018 Vietnam

viridinivea species group

- Stenoloba viridinivea Han & Kononenko, 2009 Yunnan

brunneola species group

- Stenoloba brunneola (Draudt, 1950) Yunnan
- Stenoloba pinratanai Behounek & Kononenko, 2010

olivacea species group

- Stenoloba olivacea (Wileman, 1914) Taiwan
- Stenoloba benedeki Ronkay, 2001 northern Vietnam
- Stenoloba fontinalis Kononenko & Ronkay, 1998 Korea
- Stenoloba albistriata Kononenko & Ronkay, 2000 northern Myanmar, Yunnan
- Stenoloba cineracea Kononenko & Ronkay, 2000 Shaanxi
- Stenoloba solaris Pekarsky & Saldaitis, 2013 northern Yunnan
- Stenoloba subsolaris Pekarsky, Dvorák & Ronkay, 2013 Sichuan
- Stenoloba sapa Perkarsky & Behounek, 2019 northern Vietnam

rectilinea species group

- Stenoloba rectilinea Yoshimoto, 1992 Yunnan, Nepal
- Stenoloba rectilinoides Han & Kononenko, 2018 Yunnan

futii species group

- Stenoloba futii Kononenko & Ronkay, 2000 Peninsular Malaysia
- Stenoloba elegans Prout, 1928 Borneo
- Stenoloba robusta Prout, 1928 Borneo
- Stenoloba pendleburyi Holloway, 2009 Peninsular Malaysia, Borneo
- Stenoloba ansari Behounek & Kononenko, 2010 Java
- Stenoloba wolfgangi Behounek & Kononenko, 2010 Sumatra
- Stenoloba albibasis Behounek & Kononenko, 2010 Sumatra
- Stenoloba javensis Behounek & Kononenko, 2010 Java
- Stenoloba futioides Behounek & Kononenko, 2010 Sumatra
- Stenoloba viridibrunnea Behounek & Kononenko, 2010 Sumatra
- Stenoloba benjamini Behounek & Kononenko, 2010 Sumatra
- Stenoloba dentilinea Behounek & Kononenko, 2010 Sumatra

basiviridis species group

- Stenoloba basiviridis Draudt, 1950 China (Zhejiang, Fujian, Shaanxi)
- Stenoloba domina Kononenko & Ronkay, 2000 Taiwan
- Stenoloba dominula Kononenko & Ronkay, 2000 Fujian
- Stenoloba siamensis Behounek & Kononenko, 2010 northern Thailand
- Stenoloba mossy Behounek & Kononenko, 2010 northern Vietnam

sericea species group

- Stenoloba sericea Kononenko & Ronkay, 2001 northern Vietnam
- Stenoloba variegata Kononenko & Ronkay, 2001 northern Vietnam
- Stenoloba viridimicta Hampson, 1910 Khasis
- Stenoloba chlorographa Kononenko & Ronkay, 2001 Nepal
- Stenoloba sacculata Behounek & Kononenko, 2010 northern Vietnam

lichenosa species group

- Stenoloba lichenosa Kononenko & Ronkay, 2001 Taiwan
- Stenoloba lichenosella Kononenko & Ronkay, 2001 northern Vietnam
- Stenoloba aenescens (Moore, 1888) Nepal, Sikkim

glaucescens species group

- Stenoloba glaucescens (Hampson, 1894) Nepal, Khasis, south-western China (Yunnan, Zizang)
- Stenoloba glauca Kononenko & Ronkay, 2001 northern Vietnam, South Korea, Taiwan
- Stenoloba albipicta Kononenko & Ronkay, 2001 Yunnan

rufosagitta species group

- Stenoloba rufosagitta Kononenko & Ronkay, 2001 Taiwan, northern Vietnam, China (Chekiang, Hunan)
- Stenoloba rufosagittoides Han & Kononenko, 2009 Sichuan
- Stenoloba viridicollar Pekarsky, 2011 China (Sichuan, Fujian)
- Stenoloba plumbeoculata Pekarsky, Dvorák & Ronkay, 2013 China (Fujian, Guangdon, Yunnan, Sichuan)

nigrabasalis species group

- Stenoloba nigrabasalis Chang, 1991 Taiwan
- Stenoloba ochribasis Kononenko & Ronkay, 2001 Laos
- Stenoloba herbacea Saldaitis & Volynkin, 2020 Yunnan
- Stenoloba nora Kononenko & Ronkay, 2001 Taiwan, China (Yunnan, Fujian), northern Vietnam
- Stenoloba uncata Han & Kononenko, 2018 Yunnan

viridescens species group

- Stenoloba viridescens Kononenko & Ronkay, 2001 northern Vietnam
- Stenoloba cinechlora Kononenko & Ronkay, 2001 northern Vietnam
- Stenoloba speideli (Kononenko & Ronkay, 2001) northern Vietnam, China (Fujian, Yunnan, Guandong)
- Stenoloba tonkina Kononenko & Ronkay, 2001 northern Vietnam
- Stenoloba longipennis Kononenko & Ronkay, 2001 northern Vietnam
- Stenoloba acutivalva Han & Kononenko, 2009 China (Yunnan, Guangxi)
- Stenoloba motuoensis Han & Lü, 2007 China (Fujian, Yunnan, Xizang), Tibet
- Stenoloba micochracea Pekarsky, Dvorák & Ronkay, 2013 Laos

lanceola species group

- Stenoloba lanceola Ronkay, 2001 northern Vietnam

matovi species group

- Stenoloba matovi Behounek & Kononenko, 2010

asymmetrica species group

- Stenoloba asymmetrica Han & Kononenko, 2018 Yunnan

acontioides species group

- Stenoloba acontioides Han & Kononenko, 2018 Yunnan

Unrecognized species group

- Stenoloba ferrimacula (Hampson, 1907) Khasis
- Stenoloba prasinana Warren, 1913 Khasia Hills
- Stenoloba punctistigma (Hampson, 1894) Simla
- Stenoloba simplicilinea Warren, 1913 Khasia Hills
- Stenoloba umbrifera Hampson, 1918 Sichuan
- Stenoloba hystrix Sohn & Tzuoo, 2012 northern Vietnam
