= Cryphia sarepta =

Scientific classification
- Domain: Eukaryota
- Kingdom: Animalia
- Phylum: Arthropoda
- Class: Insecta
- Order: Lepidoptera
- Superfamily: Noctuoidea
- Family: Noctuidae
- Genus: Cryphia
- Species: C. sarepta

Binomial name
- Cryphia sarepta (Barnes, 1907)

Species of moth

Cryphia sarepta is a species of moth in the family Noctuidae (the owlet moths). It was first described by William Barnes in 1907 and it is found in North America.

The MONA or Hodges number for Cryphia sarepta is 9295.
