= Victrix tabora =

Scientific classification
- Domain: Eukaryota
- Kingdom: Animalia
- Phylum: Arthropoda
- Class: Insecta
- Order: Lepidoptera
- Superfamily: Noctuoidea
- Family: Noctuidae
- Genus: Victrix
- Species: V. tabora

Binomial name
- Victrix tabora (Staudinger, 1892)

Species of moth

Victrix tabora is a moth of the family Noctuidae. It is found in the south-eastern part of the Taurus Mountains in Turkey, the mountains of northern Iraq and western Iran and the Judean Mountains in Israel.

Adults are on wing in autumn. There is one generation per year.
