= Cryphia postochrea =

Scientific classification
- Kingdom: Animalia
- Phylum: Arthropoda
- Class: Insecta
- Order: Lepidoptera
- Superfamily: Noctuoidea
- Family: Noctuidae
- Genus: Cryphia
- Species: C. postochrea

Binomial name
- Cryphia postochrea (Hampson, 1893)

Synonyms
- Docirava postochrea Hampson, 1893

Species of moth

Cryphia postochrea is a moth of the family Noctuidae.
