= Cryphia moeonis =

Scientific classification
- Domain: Eukaryota
- Kingdom: Animalia
- Phylum: Arthropoda
- Class: Insecta
- Order: Lepidoptera
- Superfamily: Noctuoidea
- Family: Noctuidae
- Genus: Cryphia
- Species: C. moeonis

Binomial name
- Cryphia moeonis (Lederer, 1865)

Synonyms
- Cryphia maeonis; Bryophila moeonis Lederer, 1865; Bryophila praecana Christoph, 1893; Bryophila maeonis f. centralis Draudt, 1931; Bryophila centralis occidentalis Osthelder, 1933

Species of moth

Cryphia moeonis is a moth of the family Noctuidae. It is found in the Near East and Middle East, mainly in steppes and semi-deserts. In the Levant it is found in Jordan and Israel.

Adults are on wing from June to August. There is one generation per year.

The larvae probably feed on lichen.
