= Cryphia olivacea =

Scientific classification
- Domain: Eukaryota
- Kingdom: Animalia
- Phylum: Arthropoda
- Class: Insecta
- Order: Lepidoptera
- Superfamily: Noctuoidea
- Family: Noctuidae
- Genus: Cryphia
- Species: C. olivacea

Binomial name
- Cryphia olivacea (Smith, 1891)

Synonyms
- Cerma olivacea Smith, 1891; Cryphia galva (Strecker, 1898)

Species of moth

Cryphia olivacea is a moth of the family Noctuidae first described by Smith in 1891. It is found in North America from British Columbia, south to California.

The wingspan is about 26 mm.
