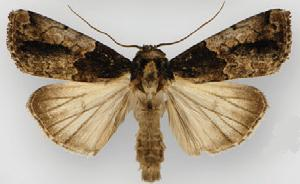
- Male
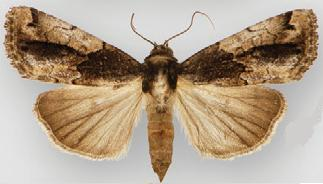
- Female

Scientific classification
- Domain: Eukaryota
- Kingdom: Animalia
- Phylum: Arthropoda
- Class: Insecta
- Order: Lepidoptera
- Superfamily: Noctuoidea
- Family: Noctuidae
- Genus: Bryolymnia
- Species: B. anthracitaria

Binomial name
- Bryolymnia anthracitaria Ferris & McFarland, 2007

= Bryolymnia anthracitaria =

Species of moth

Bryolymnia anthracitaria is a moth of the family Noctuidae first described by Clifford D. Ferris and Noel McFarland in 2007. It is known only from south-eastern Arizona where it has been collected in oak scrub grassland.

The length of the forewings is 12 to 16 millimetres (0.47 to 0.63 in). Adults have been collected from late June to late August.
