= Bryonycta =

Scientific classification
- Domain: Eukaryota
- Kingdom: Animalia
- Phylum: Arthropoda
- Class: Insecta
- Order: Lepidoptera
- Superfamily: Noctuoidea
- Family: Noctuidae
- Subfamily: Bryophilinae
- Genus: Bryonycta; Boursin, 1955

Genus of moths

Bryonycta is a genus of moths of the family Noctuidae. The genus was erected by Charles Boursin in 1955.

== Species ==
- Bryonycta pineti (Staudinger, 1859) Spain, southern France
- Bryonycta opulenta Boursin, 1957 Canary Islands
