= Bryolymnia bicon =

Scientific classification
- Domain: Eukaryota
- Kingdom: Animalia
- Phylum: Arthropoda
- Class: Insecta
- Order: Lepidoptera
- Superfamily: Noctuoidea
- Family: Noctuidae
- Genus: Bryolymnia
- Species: B. bicon

Binomial name
- Bryolymnia bicon (H. Druce, 1889)

Synonyms
- Calymnia bicon H. Druce, 1889; Dacira ranapa Schaus, 1898

Species of moth

Bryolymnia bicon is a moth of the family Noctuidae first described by Herbert Druce in 1889. It is found from Veracruz in central-eastern Mexico southward to Costa Rica.
