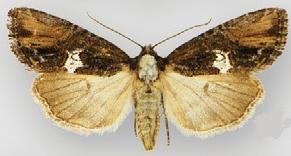
- Female
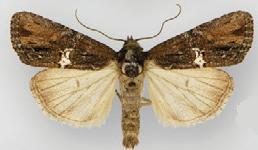
- Male

Scientific classification
- Domain: Eukaryota
- Kingdom: Animalia
- Phylum: Arthropoda
- Class: Insecta
- Order: Lepidoptera
- Superfamily: Noctuoidea
- Family: Noctuidae
- Genus: Bryolymnia
- Species: B. semifascia

Binomial name
- Bryolymnia semifascia (J. B. Smith, 1900)

Synonyms
- Chytonix semifascia J. B. Smith, 1900

= Bryolymnia semifascia =

Species of moth

Bryolymnia semifascia, the half-banded bryolymnia, is a moth of the family Noctuidae. The species was first described by John Bernhardt Smith in 1900. It is found in the US from northern Colorado and southern Utah southward to south-eastern Arizona and south-central New Mexico.

The wingspan is 26–29 mm. Adults have been collected from mid-June to mid-September in conifer forests.
