= Cryphia tephrocharis =

Scientific classification
- Domain: Eukaryota
- Kingdom: Animalia
- Phylum: Arthropoda
- Class: Insecta
- Order: Lepidoptera
- Superfamily: Noctuoidea
- Family: Noctuidae
- Genus: Cryphia
- Species: C. tephrocharis

Binomial name
- Cryphia tephrocharis Boursin, 1954

Species of moth

Cryphia tephrocharis is a moth of the family Noctuidae. It is found in Turkey and the Balkans. In the Levant recorded from Lebanon, Israel and Jordan.

Adults are on wing from May to August. There is one generation per year.

The larvae probably feed on lichen.
