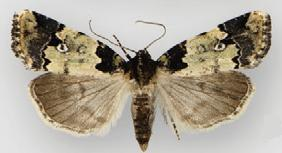
- Female
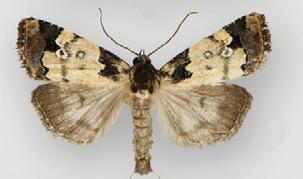
- Male

Scientific classification
- Domain: Eukaryota
- Kingdom: Animalia
- Phylum: Arthropoda
- Class: Insecta
- Order: Lepidoptera
- Superfamily: Noctuoidea
- Family: Noctuidae
- Genus: Bryolymnia
- Species: B. marti

Binomial name
- Bryolymnia marti Holland, 2010

= Bryolymnia marti =

Species of moth

Bryolymnia marti is a moth of the family Noctuidae first described by Richard Holland in 2010. It is found from central New Mexico and east-central Arizona southward to Durango in northern Mexico.

The length of the forewings is 11–12 mm. Adults have been collected between early June and early July in conifer forests.
