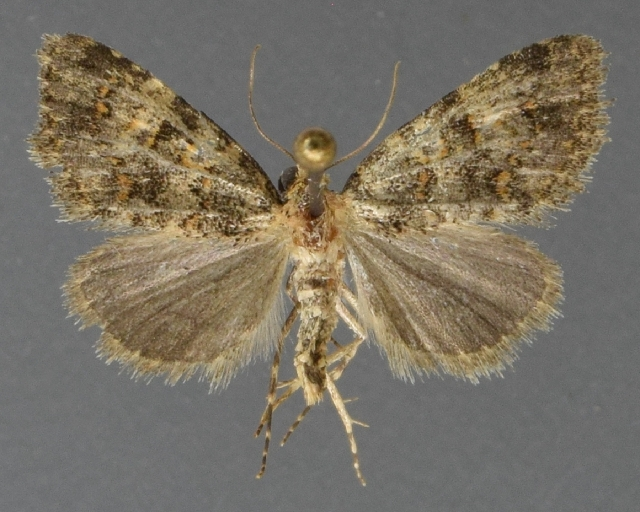

Scientific classification
- Domain: Eukaryota
- Kingdom: Animalia
- Phylum: Arthropoda
- Class: Insecta
- Order: Lepidoptera
- Superfamily: Noctuoidea
- Family: Noctuidae
- Genus: Cryphia
- Species: C. nana

Binomial name
- Cryphia nana (Barnes & McDunnough, 1911)

Synonyms
- Cerma nana Barnes & McDunnough, 1911; Cryphia nanoides Franclemont & Todd, 1983

= Cryphia nana =

Species of moth

Cryphia nana is a moth of the family Noctuidae first described by William Barnes and James Halliday McDunnough in 1911. It can be found in the US state of California.
