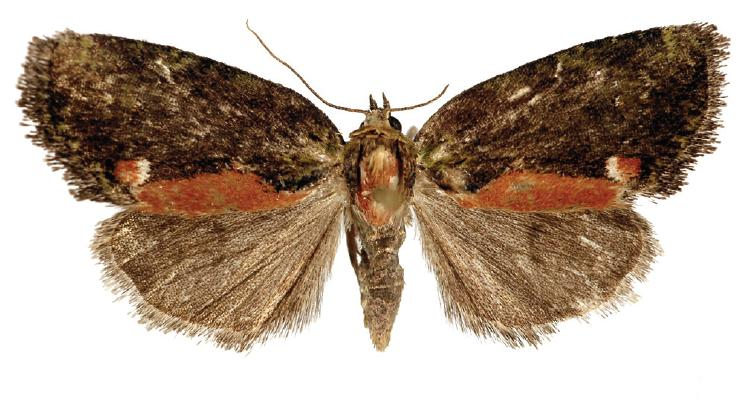
- Female

Scientific classification
- Kingdom: Animalia
- Phylum: Arthropoda
- Clade: Pancrustacea
- Class: Insecta
- Order: Lepidoptera
- Superfamily: Noctuoidea
- Family: Noctuidae
- Genus: Stenoloba
- Species: S. viridicollar

Binomial name
- Stenoloba viridicollar Pekarsky, 2011

= Stenoloba viridicollar =

Species of moth

Stenoloba viridicollar is a moth of the family Noctuidae. It is found in southwestern China (Sichuan)

The wingspan is about 22 mm.

== Etymology ==
The name viridicollar refers to the greyish-green coloration of head and collar, which is the main external distinguishing character of the species.
