= Cryphia paulina =

Scientific classification
- Kingdom: Animalia
- Phylum: Arthropoda
- Class: Insecta
- Order: Lepidoptera
- Superfamily: Noctuoidea
- Family: Noctuidae
- Genus: Cryphia
- Species: C. paulina

Binomial name
- Cryphia paulina (Staudinger, 1892)

Species of moth

Cryphia paulina is a moth of the family Noctuidae. It is found in eastern Arabia, Israel, Jordan and the Sinai in Egypt.

Adults are on wing from April to May. There is probably one generation per year.

The larvae probably feed on lichen.
