= Cryphia pallidioides =

Scientific classification
- Kingdom: Animalia
- Phylum: Arthropoda
- Class: Insecta
- Order: Lepidoptera
- Superfamily: Noctuoidea
- Family: Noctuidae
- Genus: Cryphia
- Species: C. pallidioides

Binomial name
- Cryphia pallidioides Poole, 1989

Species of moth

Cryphia pallidioides is a species of moth in the family Noctuidae (the owlet moths). It is found in North America.

The MONA or Hodges number for Cryphia pallidioides is 9293.
