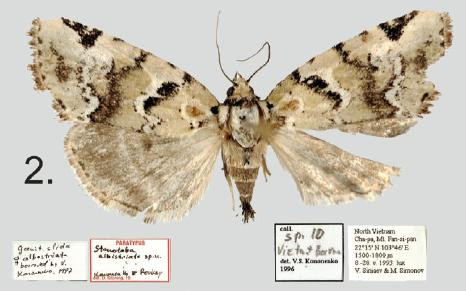

Scientific classification
- Kingdom: Animalia
- Phylum: Arthropoda
- Clade: Pancrustacea
- Class: Insecta
- Order: Lepidoptera
- Superfamily: Noctuoidea
- Family: Noctuidae
- Genus: Stenoloba
- Species: S. albistriata

Binomial name
- Stenoloba albistriata Kononenko & Ronkay, 2000

= Stenoloba albistriata =

Species of moth

Stenoloba albistriata is a moth of the family Noctuidae. It is found in northern Vietnam.
