= Cryphia flavidior =

Scientific classification
- Kingdom: Animalia
- Phylum: Arthropoda
- Clade: Pancrustacea
- Class: Insecta
- Order: Lepidoptera
- Superfamily: Noctuoidea
- Family: Noctuidae
- Genus: Cryphia
- Species: C. flavidior

Binomial name
- Cryphia flavidior (Barnes & McDunnough, 1911)

Synonyms
- Cryphia fulvisparsa (Hampson, 1914)

Species of moth

Cryphia flavidior is a species of moth in the family Noctuidae (the owlet moths). It was first described by William Barnes and James Halliday McDunnough in 1911 and it is found in North America.

The MONA or Hodges number for Cryphia flavidior is 9289.
