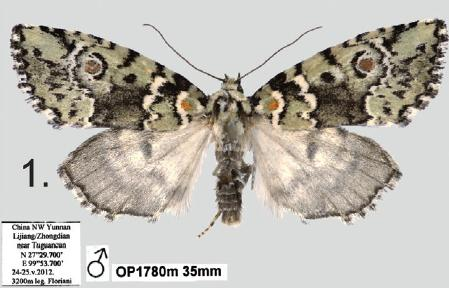

Scientific classification
- Kingdom: Animalia
- Phylum: Arthropoda
- Clade: Pancrustacea
- Class: Insecta
- Order: Lepidoptera
- Superfamily: Noctuoidea
- Family: Noctuidae
- Genus: Stenoloba
- Species: S. solaris

Binomial name
- Stenoloba solaris Pekarsky & Saldaitis, 2013

= Stenoloba solaris =

Species of moth

Stenoloba solaris is a moth of the family Noctuidae. It is found in China (Yunnan)

The wingspan is about 34 mm. The ground colour of the forewings is lettuce green with a dark-grey area medially. The wing pattern is well marked with well-developed cross-lines. The hindwings are grey with a dark grey discal spot and heavy black terminal line.

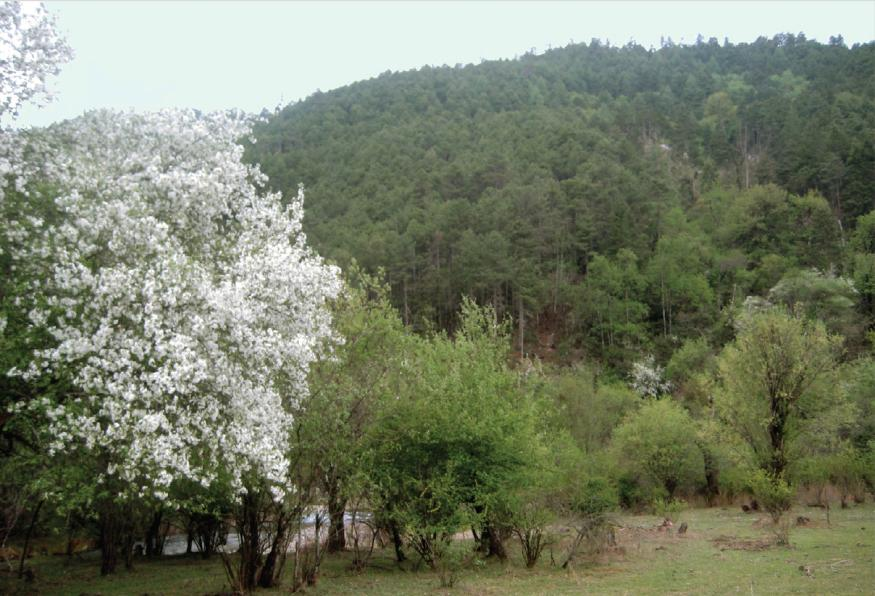
Habitat

== Etymology ==
The species name refers to the orange circular patch at the reniform stigma resembling the rising sun.
