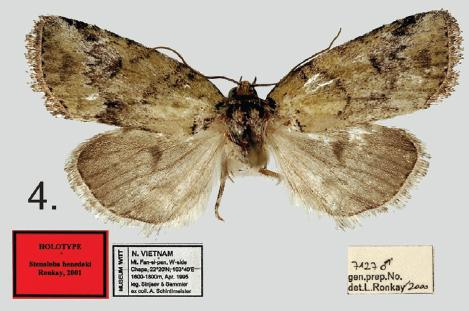

Scientific classification
- Kingdom: Animalia
- Phylum: Arthropoda
- Clade: Pancrustacea
- Class: Insecta
- Order: Lepidoptera
- Superfamily: Noctuoidea
- Family: Noctuidae
- Genus: Stenoloba
- Species: S. benedeki

Binomial name
- Stenoloba benedeki Ronkay, 2001

= Stenoloba benedeki =

Species of moth

Stenoloba albistriata is a moth of the family Noctuidae first described by László Aladár Ronkay in 2011. It is found in northern Vietnam.
