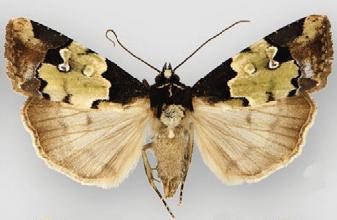
- Female

Scientific classification
- Domain: Eukaryota
- Kingdom: Animalia
- Phylum: Arthropoda
- Class: Insecta
- Order: Lepidoptera
- Superfamily: Noctuoidea
- Family: Noctuidae
- Genus: Bryolymnia
- Species: B. viridimedia

Binomial name
- Bryolymnia viridimedia (J. B. Smith, 1905)

Synonyms
- Bryophila viridimedia J. B. Smith 1905

= Bryolymnia viridimedia =

Species of moth

Bryolymnia viridimedia is a moth of the family Noctuidae first described by John Bernhardt Smith in 1905. It is found from south-eastern Arizona (Huachuca and Santa Rita Mountains) southward in the Sierra Madre Occidental to the Mexico City area.

The wingspan is about 36 mm. Adults have been collected from early July to mid-September.
