= Cryphia rectilinea =

Scientific classification
- Domain: Eukaryota
- Kingdom: Animalia
- Phylum: Arthropoda
- Class: Insecta
- Order: Lepidoptera
- Superfamily: Noctuoidea
- Family: Noctuidae
- Genus: Cryphia
- Species: C. rectilinea

Binomial name
- Cryphia rectilinea (Warren, 1909)

Synonyms
- Metachrostis rectilinea Warren, 1909; Cryphia rectilinea insulicola Reisser, 1962

Species of moth

Cryphia rectilinea is a moth of the family Noctuidae. It is found in the Balkans, Italy, Turkey, Lebanon and Israel.

== Life cycle ==
Adults have a flight period from May to September. There is one generation per year.

The larvae probably feed on lichen.
