= Cryphia amseli =

Scientific classification
- Domain: Eukaryota
- Kingdom: Animalia
- Phylum: Arthropoda
- Class: Insecta
- Order: Lepidoptera
- Superfamily: Noctuoidea
- Family: Noctuidae
- Genus: Cryphia
- Species: C. amseli

Binomial name
- Cryphia amseli Boursin, 1952

Species of moth

Cryphia amseli is a moth of the family Noctuidae. It is probably endemic to the arid part of the Jordan Rift Valley. It is known only from the type locality: Israel, Jericho, April 1952. It has not been observed since.

There is probably one generation per year.
