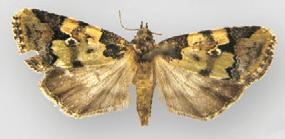
- Female

Scientific classification
- Domain: Eukaryota
- Kingdom: Animalia
- Phylum: Arthropoda
- Class: Insecta
- Order: Lepidoptera
- Superfamily: Noctuoidea
- Family: Noctuidae
- Genus: Bryolymnia
- Species: B. picturata

Binomial name
- Bryolymnia picturata (Schaus, 1894)

Synonyms
- Calymnia picturata Schaus, 1894

= Bryolymnia picturata =

Species of moth

Bryolymnia picturata is a moth of the family Noctuidae first described by William Schaus in 1894. It is found in south-eastern Mexico.
