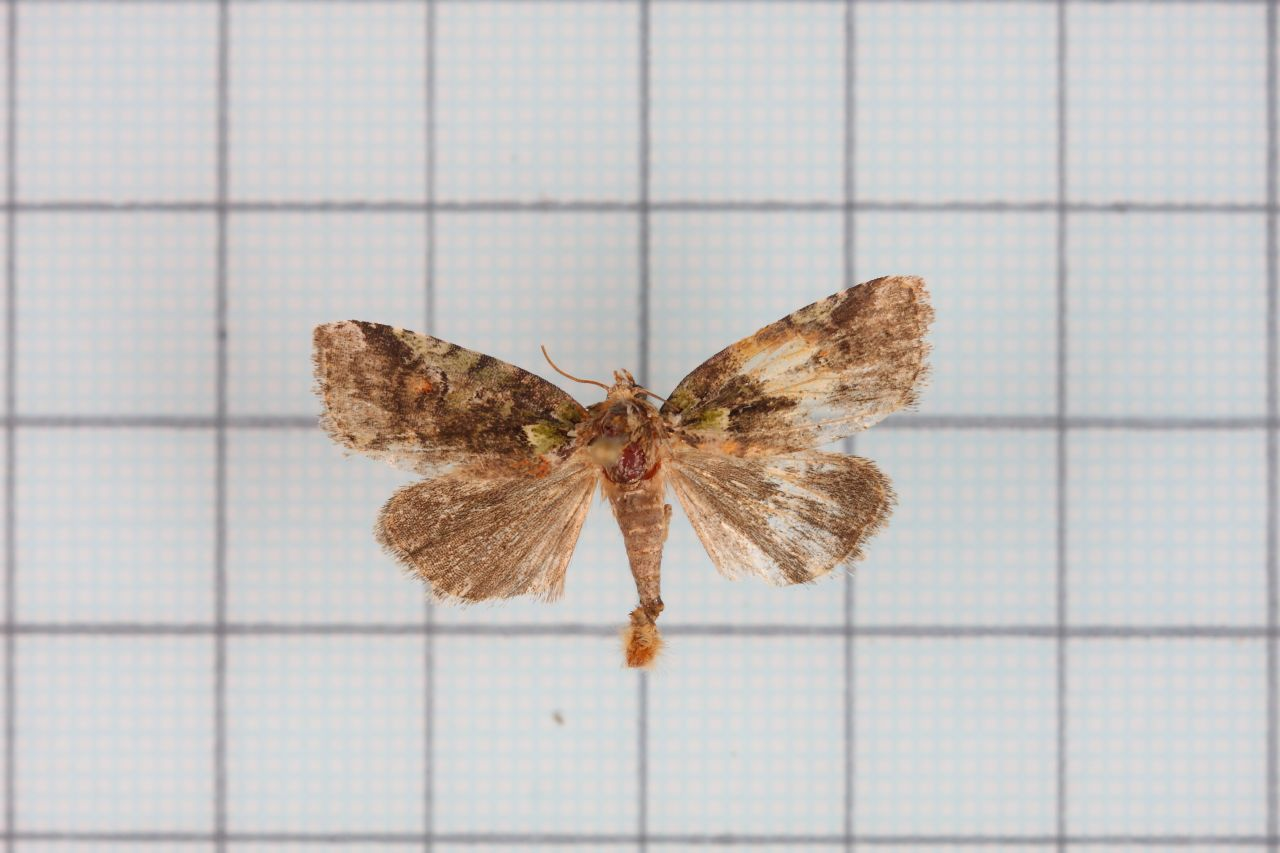

Scientific classification
- Domain: Eukaryota
- Kingdom: Animalia
- Phylum: Arthropoda
- Class: Insecta
- Order: Lepidoptera
- Superfamily: Noctuoidea
- Family: Noctuidae
- Genus: Stenoloba
- Species: S. nigrabasalis

Binomial name
- Stenoloba nigrabasalis B. S. Chang, 1991

= Stenoloba nigrabasalis =

Species of moth

Stenoloba nigrabasalis is a species of moth of the family Noctuidae. It is found in Taiwan.
