= Bryomoia =

Scientific classification
- Domain: Eukaryota
- Kingdom: Animalia
- Phylum: Arthropoda
- Class: Insecta
- Order: Lepidoptera
- Superfamily: Noctuoidea
- Family: Noctuidae
- Genus: Bryomoia; Staudinger, 1892
- Species: B. melachlora

Binomial name
- Bryomoia melachlora Staudinger, 1892

Synonyms
- Bryomoea melachlora; Hampson, 1908

Genus of moths

Bryomoia is a monotypic moth genus of the family Noctuidae. Its only species, Bryomoia melachlora, is found in south-eastern Siberia, Korea, Japan and Taiwan. Both the genus and species were first described by Staudinger in 1892.
