= Cryphia petrea =

Scientific classification
- Kingdom: Animalia
- Phylum: Arthropoda
- Clade: Pancrustacea
- Class: Insecta
- Order: Lepidoptera
- Superfamily: Noctuoidea
- Family: Noctuidae
- Genus: Cryphia
- Species: C. petrea

Binomial name
- Cryphia petrea (Guenée, 1852)

Synonyms
- Bryophila petrea Guenée, 1852; Bryophila contristans Lederer, 1857; Bryophila petrea var. hoerhammeri Schawerda, 1927; Bryophila petrea f. ramosana Draudt, 1931; Bryophila petrea f. transversa Draudt, 1931

Species of moth

Cryphia petrea is a moth of the family Noctuidae. It is found from Spain through North Africa to the Near East and Middle East. In the Levant it is found in Lebanon, Jordan and Israel.

Adults are on wing in August in Israel. There is one generation per year.

The larvae probably feed on lichen.

== Subspecies ==
- Cryphia petrea petrea
- Cryphia petrea contristans (Lebanon, Jordan, Israel)
