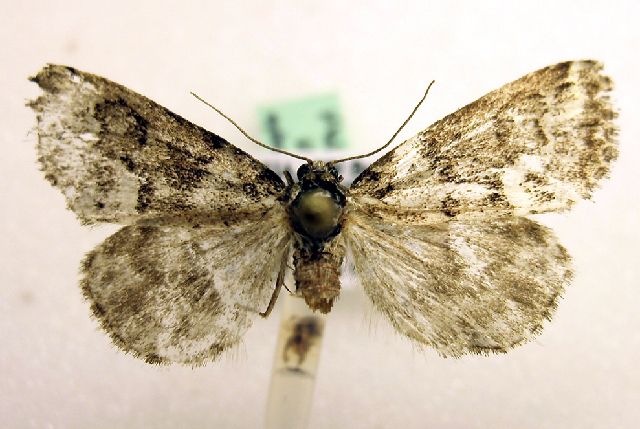
- Victrix umovii

Scientific classification
- Kingdom: Animalia
- Phylum: Arthropoda
- Class: Insecta
- Order: Lepidoptera
- Superfamily: Noctuoidea
- Family: Noctuidae
- Subfamily: Acronictinae
- Genus: Victrix; Staudinger in Romanoff, 1879

Synonyms
- Poliobrya (Acronyctinae) Hampson, 1908; Oedibrya Hampson, 1918; Esteparia Fernández, 1931; Amelina Draudt, 1934; Chytobrya Draudt, 1950; Moureia Orfila & Rossi, 1957; Rasihia Koçak, 1989

= Victrix =

Genus of moths

Victrix is a genus of moths in the family Noctuidae described by Otto Staudinger in 1879. It may be synonymous with the genus Moureia.

== Species ==
Subgenus Victrix

- Victrix karsiana Staudinger, 1879 Armenia, north-eastern Turkey, Asia Minor
- Victrix gracilis (Wagner, 1931) Turkey
- Victrix agenjoi (Fernández, 1931) Spain
- Victrix artaxias Varga & Ronkay, 1989 Armenia
- Victrix pinkeri Hacker & Lödl, 1989
- Victrix marmorata (Warren, 1914) Qinghai

Subgenus Rasihia

- Victrix acronictoides Han & Kononenko, 2017 Yunnan
- Victrix boursini (Draudt, 1936) Turkey
- Victrix chloroxantha (Boursin, 1957) Afghanistan
- Victrix commixta (Warren, 1909) northern Afghanistan
- Victrix confucii (Alphéraky, 1892) Tibet
- Victrix conspersa (Christoph, 1893) Turkmenistan
- Victrix diadela (Hampson, 1908) western Turkestan
- Victrix duelduelica (Osthelder, 1932) Turkey
- Victrix gracilior (Draudt, 1950)
- Victrix hackeri Varga & Ronkay, 1991
- Victrix illustris Varga & Ronkay, 1991 Afghanistan
- Victrix klapperichi Hacker, 2001
- Victrix lichenodes Boursin, 1969 Afghanistan
- Victrix macrosema (Boursin, 1957) northern Iran
- Victrix marginelota (Joannis, 1888) Syria, Transcaspia
- Victrix nanata (Draudt, 1950) Yunnan
- Victrix octogesima (Boursin, 1960) Afghanistan
- Victrix precisa (Warren, 1909) Morocco, Algeria
- Victrix sassanica Wiltshire, 1961 Iran
- Victrix superior (Draudt, 1950) Yunnan
- Victrix tabora (Staudinger, [1892]) Syria, Turkey
- Victrix tristis (Rungs, 1945) western Sahara

Subgenus Chytobrya

- Victrix albida (Draudt, 1950) Sichuan
- Victrix bryophiloides (Draudt, 1950) Yunnan
- Victrix fraudatrix (Draudt, 1950) Sichuan, Yunnan
- Victrix perlopsis (Draudt, 1950) Sichuan

Subgenus Poliobrya

- Victrix patula (Püngeler, 1906) eastern Turkestan, Xinjiang
- Victrix umovii (Eversmann, 1846) Sweden, Finland, Estonia, Latvia, Lithuania, Poland, Ukraine, Moldova, western Kazakhstan, Urals, south-western Siberia
- Victrix svetlanae Koshkin & Pekarsky, 2020 south-eastern Siberia
- Victrix fabiani Varga & Ronkay, 1989 Mongolia
- Victrix frigidalis Varga & Ronkay, 1991
- Victrix akbet Volynkin, Titov & Cernila, 2019 north-easter Kazakhstan

Subgenus Micromima Matov, Fibiger & Ronkay, 2009

- Victrix bogdoana Matov, Fibiger & Ronkay, 2009
- Victrix bioculalis (Caradja, 1934) Mongolia, northern China
- Victrix sinensis Han, Kononenko & Behounek, 2011 Fujian, Guangdong, Zhejiang, Shaanxi
- Victrix tripuncta (Draudt, 1950) Shanxi
