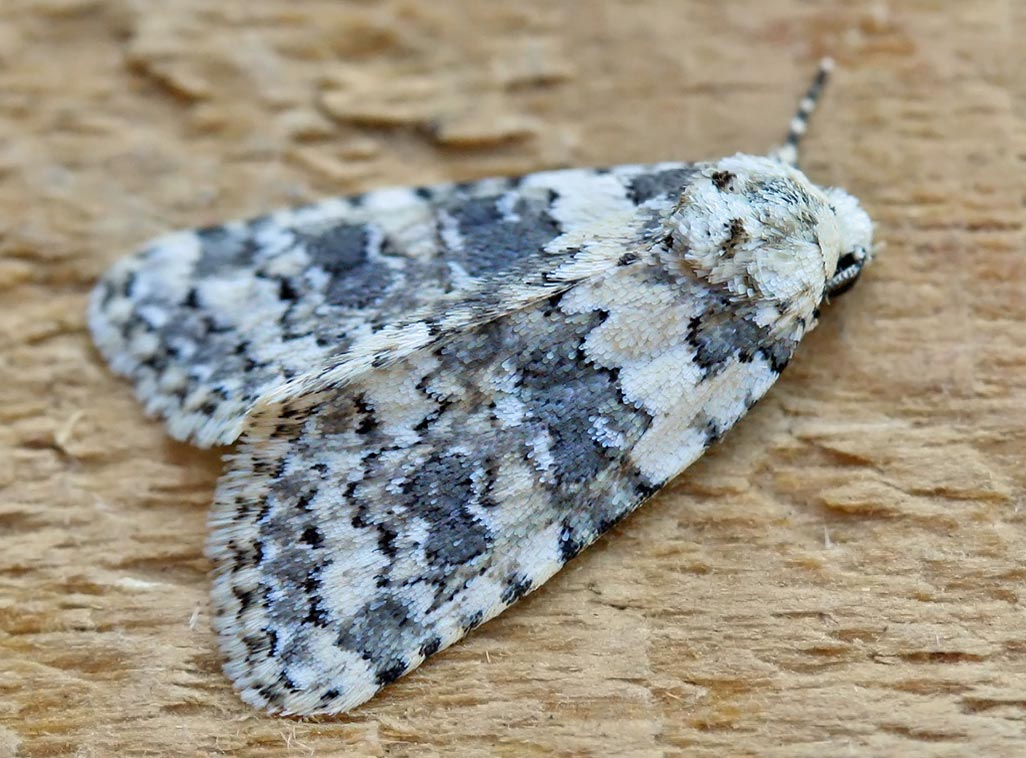

Scientific classification
- Domain: Eukaryota
- Kingdom: Animalia
- Phylum: Arthropoda
- Class: Insecta
- Order: Lepidoptera
- Superfamily: Noctuoidea
- Family: Noctuidae
- Genus: Cryphia
- Species: C. domestica

Binomial name
- Cryphia domestica (Hufnagel, 1766)

Synonyms
- Cryphia domestica; Bryophila perla; Noctua perla; Phalaena domestica; Bryophila domestica (Hufnagel, 1766)

= Marbled beauty =

Species of moth

The marbled beauty (Cryphia domestica) is a moth of the family Noctuidae. The species was first described by Johann Siegfried Hufnagel in 1766. It is an abundant species throughout most of Europe east to the Urals, and it is probably the most common lichenivorous moth of the Palearctic realm.

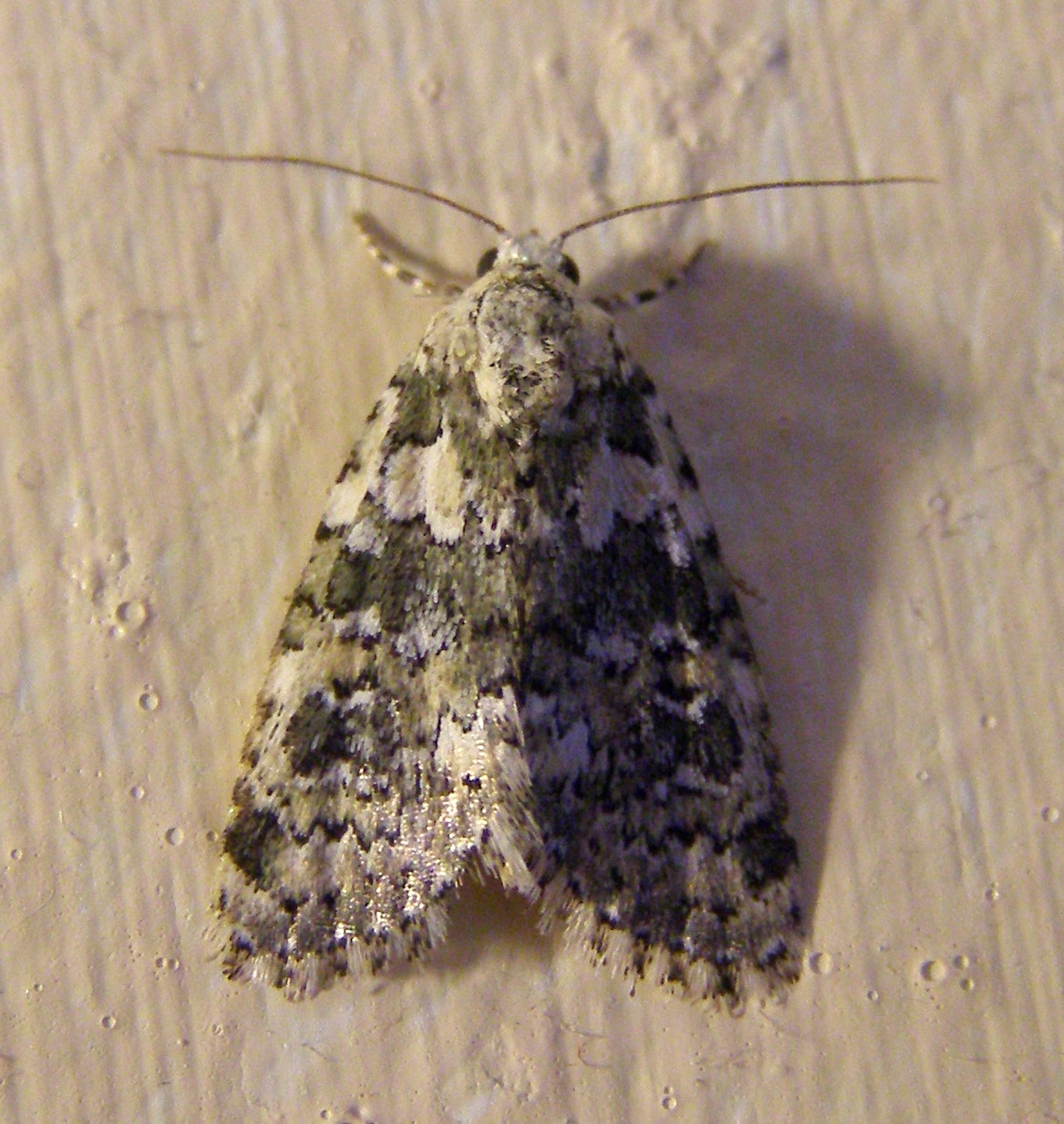

This is quite a small species with a wingspan of 22–30 mm. The forewings are white with dark grey cryptic markings, giving excellent camouflage against the lichens on which the eggs are laid. The intensity of the markings vary considerably, with darker individuals predominating in urban areas, an example of industrial melanism. A significant proportion of individuals also have orange or yellow markings. The hindwings are whitish with a broad grey band at the margin. The adults fly at night in July and August and are attracted to light.

== Distribution ==
It is found across Europe, where it occurs as far south as Sicily and in the north to Gotland. The eastern distribution is uncertain but it may reach central Asia. It rises over 2000 metres above sea level in the Alps.

== Technical description ==
Forewing cream white with slaty-grey markings; orbicular and claviform (club shaped) stigmata confluent forming a figure of eight; hindwing whitish grey with cell spot and outer line dark grey. The species varies in opposite directions; either the dark scales of forewing are more or less obsolete and the wing is overrun with yellow scaling ab. lutescens Fuchs or the wing becomes wholly suffused with the dark tints ab. suffusa Tutt; the dark specimens from the Pyrenees, referred here by Staudinger, are blacker than the very darkest British specimens, the whole hindwing being blackish also; in ab. distincta Tutt the ground colour is white, the discoidal spots dark grey; four short dark dashes on costa at centre and a shade near apex, a short basal streak and a shade beneath the orbicular stigma are the only markings.

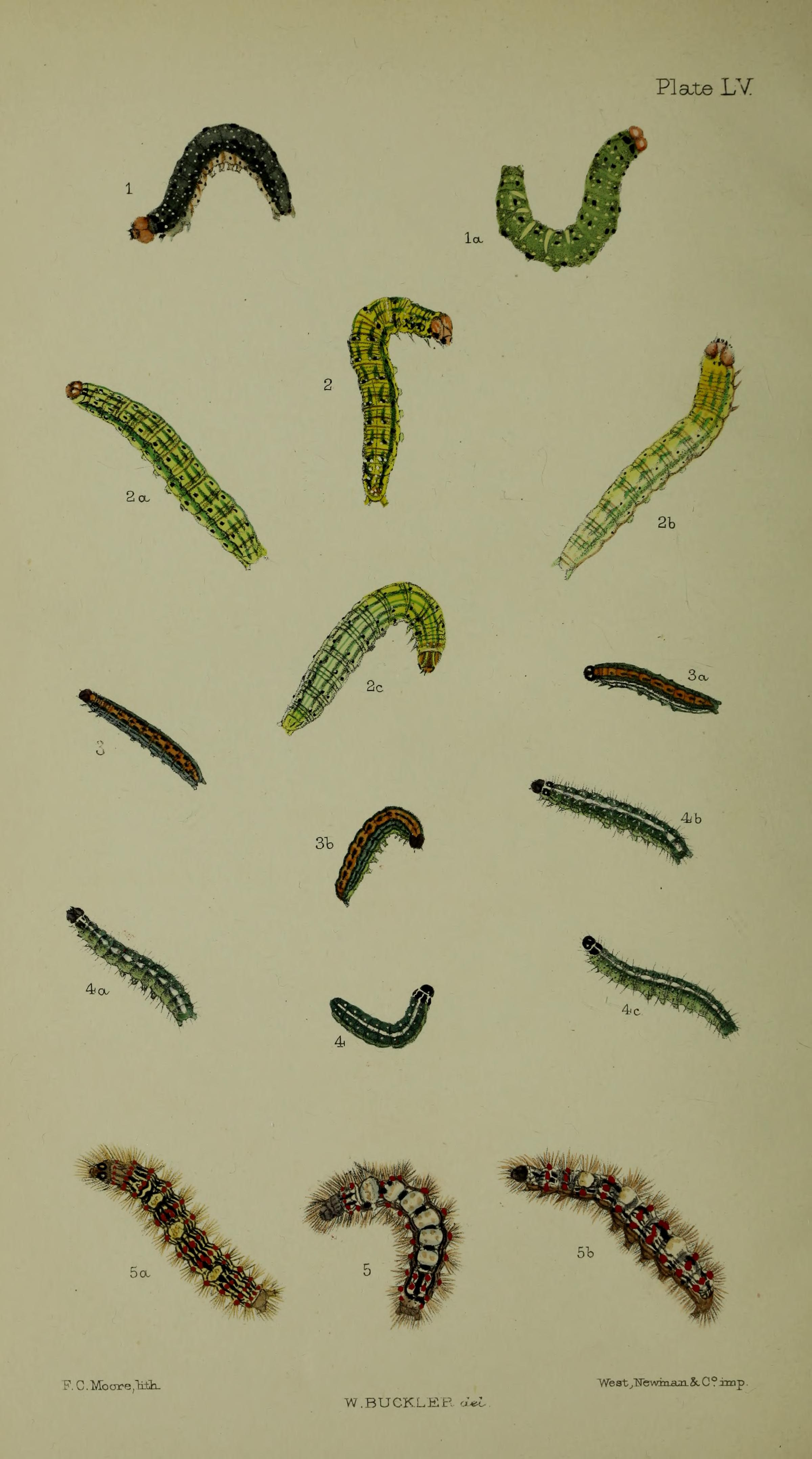
Figs 3, 3a, 3b larvae after final moult

The larva is bluish grey with orange markings along the back. It feeds exclusively on lichens such as Lecidea and Xanthoria. This species overwinters as a larva.

== Notes ==
1. The flight season refers to the British Isles. This may vary in other parts of the range.
