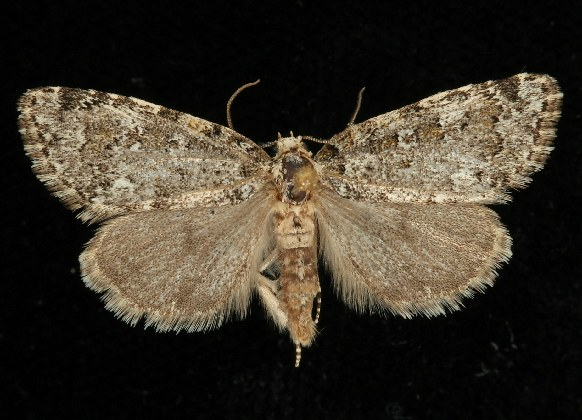

Scientific classification
- Domain: Eukaryota
- Kingdom: Animalia
- Phylum: Arthropoda
- Class: Insecta
- Order: Lepidoptera
- Superfamily: Noctuoidea
- Family: Noctuidae
- Genus: Cryphia
- Species: C. cuerva

Binomial name
- Cryphia cuerva (Barnes, 1907)

Synonyms
- Cerma cuerva Barnes, 1907

= Cryphia cuerva =

Species of moth

Cryphia cuerva, the cryphia moth, is a moth of the family Noctuidae first described by William Barnes in 1907. It is found in western North America from British Columbia and Alberta, south to California.

The wingspan is about 24 mm. Adults are on wing from July to October in California and from July to September in Oregon.
