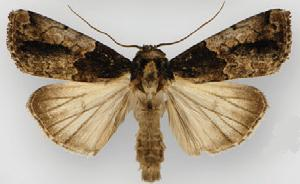
- Bryolymnia anthracitaria

Scientific classification
- Kingdom: Animalia
- Phylum: Arthropoda
- Class: Insecta
- Order: Lepidoptera
- Superfamily: Noctuoidea
- Family: Noctuidae
- Subfamily: Xyleninae
- Genus: Bryolymnia; Hampson, 1908

= Bryolymnia =

Genus of moths

Bryolymnia is a genus of moths of the family Noctuidae erected by George Hampson in 1908.

== Species ==
- Bryolymnia anthracitaria Ferris & McFarland, 2007
- Bryolymnia atriceps Hampson, 1910
- Bryolymnia bicon (Druce, 1889)
- Bryolymnia biformata Lafontaine & Walsh, 2010
- Bryolymnia castrena E. D. Jones, 1914
- Bryolymnia clarita (Köhler, 1979)
- Bryolymnia dido (Köhler, 1989)
- Bryolymnia ensina (Barnes, 1907)
- Bryolymnia floccifera (Möschler, 1886)
- Bryolymnia forreri (Druce, 1889)
- Bryolymnia haustea Schaus, 1940
- Bryolymnia marginata Schaus, 1911
- Bryolymnia marti Holland, 2010
- Bryolymnia mixta Lafontaine & Walsh, 2010
- Bryolymnia monodonta (Kaye, 1922)
- Bryolymnia nigrescens (Dyar, 1912)
- Bryolymnia picturata (Schaus, 1894)
- Bryolymnia poasia Schaus, 1911
- Bryolymnia roma (Druce, 1894)
- Bryolymnia semifascia (Smith, 1900)
- Bryolymnia strabonis Dognin, 1916
- Bryolymnia viridata (Harvey, 1876)
- Bryolymnia viridimedia (Smith, 1905)
