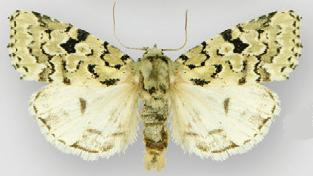
- Male
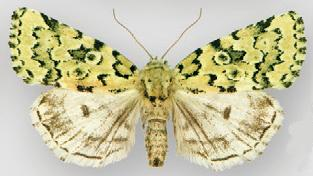
- Female

Scientific classification
- Domain: Eukaryota
- Kingdom: Animalia
- Phylum: Arthropoda
- Class: Insecta
- Order: Lepidoptera
- Superfamily: Noctuoidea
- Family: Noctuidae
- Genus: Bryolymnia
- Species: B. viridata

Binomial name
- Bryolymnia viridata (Harvey, 1876)

Synonyms
- Jaspidea viridata Harvey, 1876; Cryphia viridata (Harvey, 1876)

= Bryolymnia viridata =

Species of moth

Bryolymnia viridata is a moth of the family Noctuidae first described by Leon F. Harvey in 1876. It is found in the US in western California from Sonoma County north of San Francisco southward to San Diego County.

The wingspan is about 27 mm. Adults have been collected from late May to mid-October.
