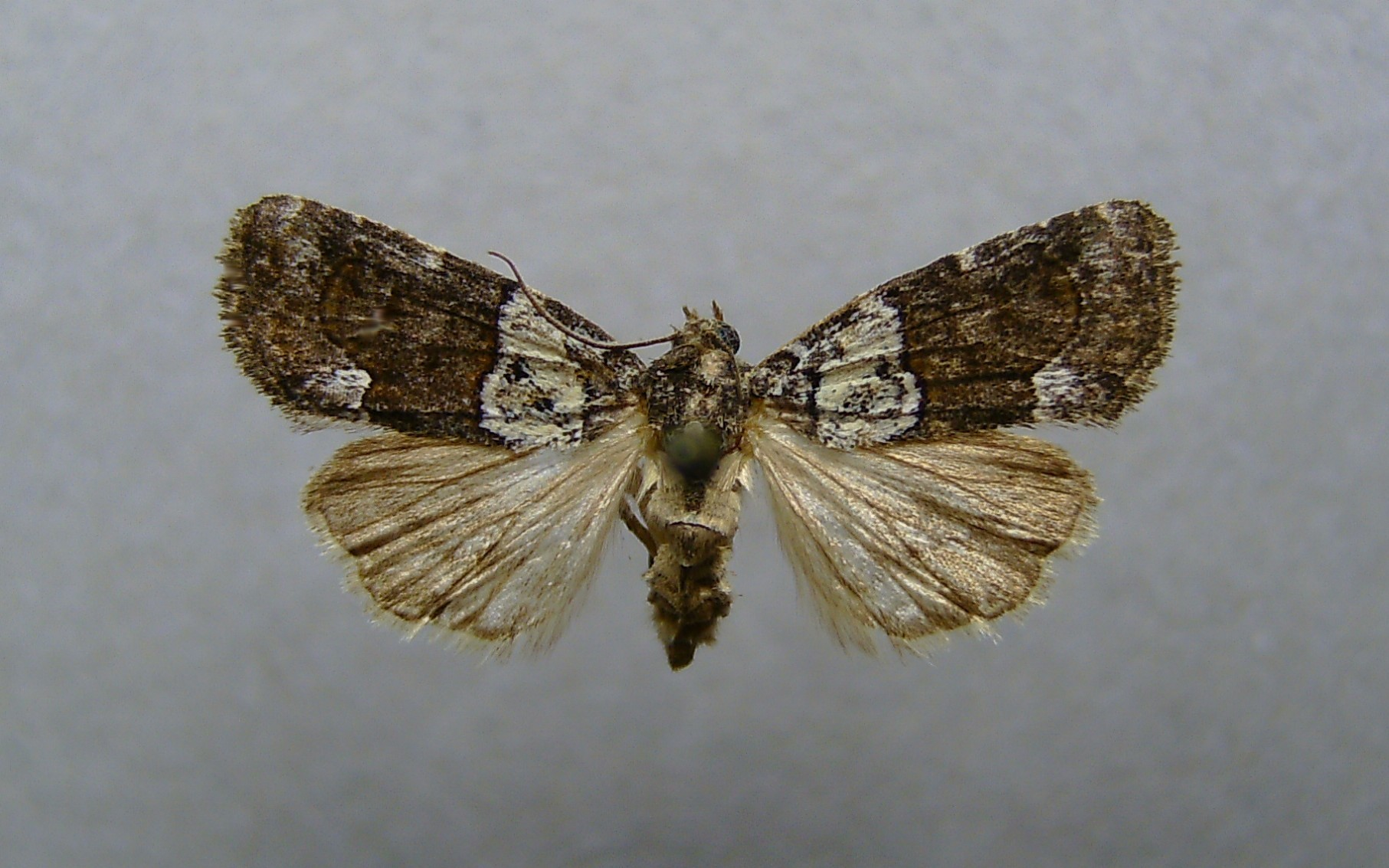

Scientific classification
- Kingdom: Animalia
- Phylum: Arthropoda
- Class: Insecta
- Order: Lepidoptera
- Superfamily: Noctuoidea
- Family: Noctuidae
- Genus: Cryphia
- Species: C. ereptricula

Binomial name
- Cryphia ereptricula Treitschke, 1825

Synonyms
- Bryophila ereptricula; Bryophila ereptripula

= Cryphia ereptricula =

Species of moth

Cryphia ereptricula is a moth of the family Noctuidae. It is found in most of central and southern Europe, from Sweden and Finland, south to Italy and Greece and from Germany east to Belarus. It has also been recorded from Spain.

The wingspan is 23–28 mm. Adults are on wing from July to August.

The larvae feed on lichen and algae.
