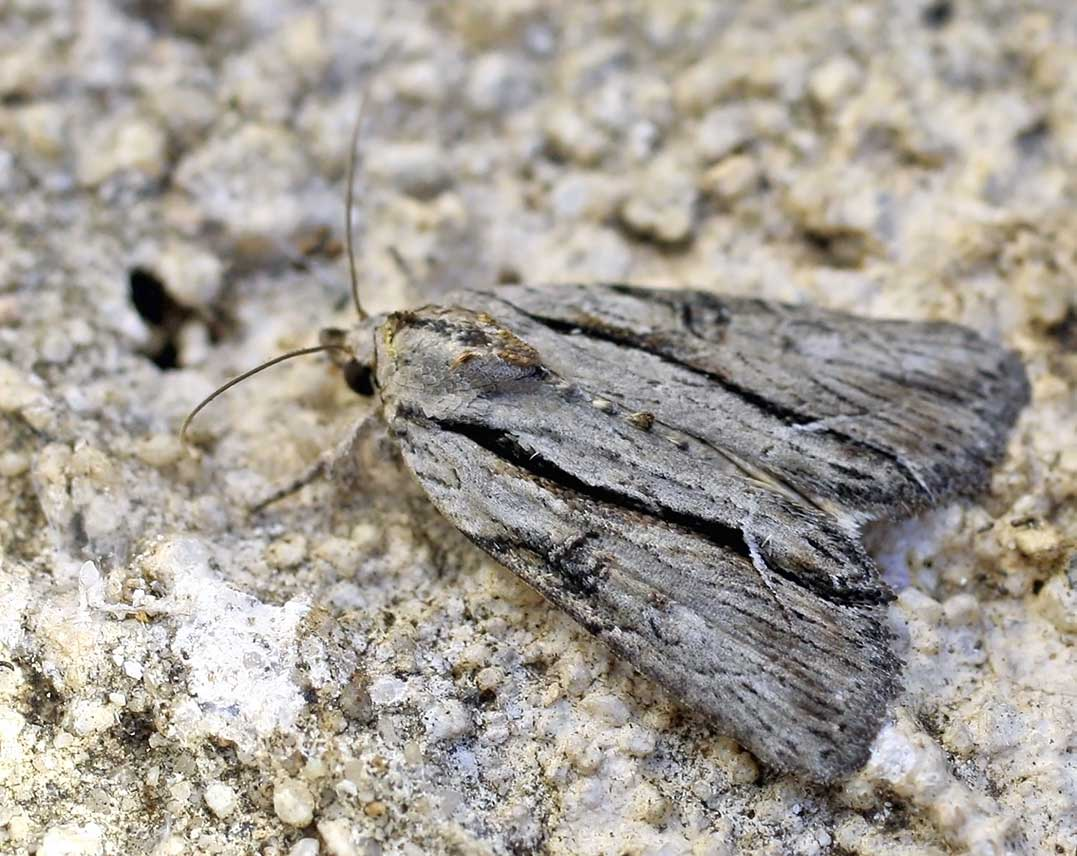

Scientific classification
- Domain: Eukaryota
- Kingdom: Animalia
- Phylum: Arthropoda
- Class: Insecta
- Order: Lepidoptera
- Superfamily: Noctuoidea
- Family: Noctuidae
- Genus: Cryphia
- Species: C. raptricula

Binomial name
- Cryphia raptricula (Denis & Schiffermüller, 1775)

Synonyms
- Noctua raptricula Denis & Schiffermüller, 1775; Bryophila raptricula; Phalaena (Noctua) divisa Esper, 1791; Phalaena (Noctua) divisa Esper, 1804; Phalaena (Noctua) palliola Borkhausen, 1792; Phalaena (Noctua) pomula Borkhausen, 1792; Noctua deceptricula Hübner, [1803]; Bryophila carbonis Freyer, 1849; Hadena felina Eversmann, 1852; Bryophila oxybiensis Millière, 1875; Bryophila raptricula var. eretina Calberla, 1888; Bryophila dolopis Hampson, 1908; Bryophila raptriculoides Turati, 1912; Catamecia bryophiloides Rothschild, 1914; Bryophila raptricula f. grisea Dannehl, 1929; Bryophila dolopis f. pallidior Draudt, 1931; Bryophila dolopis f. striata Draudt, 1931; Cryphia raptricula cretica Reisser, 1962

= Cryphia raptricula =

Species of moth

Cryphia raptricula, the marbled gray, is a moth of the family Noctuidae. The species was first described by Michael Denis and Ignaz Schiffermüller in 1775. It is found over the Palearctic from the Atlantic Ocean to Central Asia, the Russian Far East including Ussuri and the Altai Mountains. Southward, it reaches the northern parts of the Sahara desert. It is found in central and south-east Europe.

== Technical description and variation ==
M. raptricula Hbn. (= pomula Bkh.) (4b). Forewing elongate, grey with darker clouds; the lines obscure: inner outwardly oblique, twice curved: outer followed by a white crescent on submedian fold, beyond which is a black streak deflected through the fringe; stigmata inconspicuous, with dark edges; hindwing dull whitish, greyer towards margin. — The ab. carbonis Frr. (4b), as the name implies, is black. — ab. deceptricula Hbn. (4 c) has a pale brown horizontal streak from base of costa through cell to outer line and beyond, sometimes broken up into patches, and the inner margin darker. — oxybiensis Mill. (4c) is more uniformly grey than the type, while ab. striata Stgr. is distinguished by a black central streak: — lastly, ab. eretina Calb. (4c), much resembling the ab. deceptricula, is said to have the palpi yellow and porrect (extending forward), a statement which suggests, at least, a distinct species. Milliere, who considered his oxybiensis distinct, suspected its larva to feed on lichens growing on old olive-trees. — Larva blue grey, with two yellow- and white-spotted stripes. Feeds on Sticta pulmonacea. The wingspan is 29–36 mm. The length of the forewings is 12–14 mm.

== Biology ==
The moth flies from June to October depending on the location.

The larvae feed on various lichen, primarily Sticta pulmomacea.
