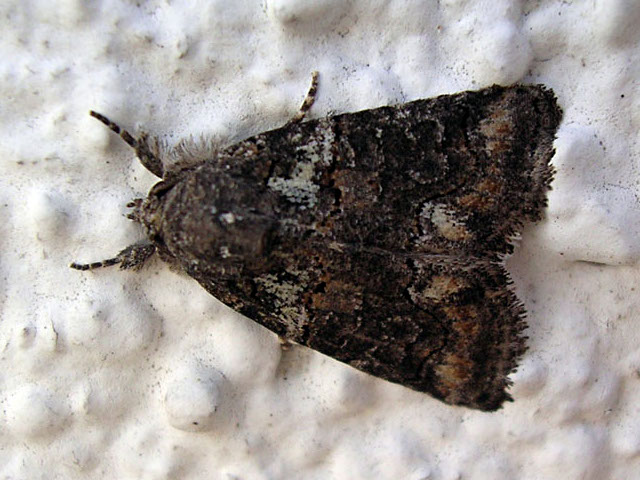

Scientific classification
- Domain: Eukaryota
- Kingdom: Animalia
- Phylum: Arthropoda
- Class: Insecta
- Order: Lepidoptera
- Superfamily: Noctuoidea
- Family: Noctuidae
- Genus: Bryophila
- Species: B. ravula

Binomial name
- Bryophila ravula (Hübner, [1813])

Synonyms
- Noctua ravula Hübner, [1813]; Cryphia ravula; Noctua lupula Hübner, [1813]; Bryophila troglodyta Freyer, 1832; Bryophila ravula var. grisescens Oberthür, 1918; Cryphia ravula ereptriculoides Boursin, 1952; Cryphia ravala ravulatra Aubert, 1953

= Bryophila ravula =

Species of moth

Bryophila ravula is a moth of the family Noctuidae. It is found in southern and central Europe.

The larvae probably feed on lichen.

== Subspecies ==
- Bryophila ravula ravula (Belgium and Germany to Spain, Sicily, the Republic of Macedonia and Bulgaria and from France to Ukraine)
- Bryophila ravula grisescens Oberthur, 1918 (Iberian Peninsula)
- Bryophila ravula ereptriculoides Boursin, 1952 (Iberian Peninsula)
