= Charles Boursin =

French entomologist (1901–1971)

- Born: 6 December 1901; Nantes, France
- Died: 27 December 1971 (aged 70); Paris, France
- Awards: Constant Prize of the Entomological Society of France

Academic work
- Discipline: entomology
- Institutions: Muséum national d'histoire naturelle National Museum of Natural History, France
- Main interests: Lepidoptera

Charles Boursin (6 December 1901 – 27 December 1971) was a French entomologist.

== Early life ==
Boursin was born into a comfortable bourgeois Catholic family in Nantes. Having had a German governess, he spoke German from his earliest days and remained "perfectly" bilingual in both during his lifetime. He also spoke Hungarian and Russian. Despite his formal humanist education he showed an early interest in the natural sciences.

== Career ==
On arriving in Paris from Nantes in 1920, he immediately made contact with Parisian entomological circles, and in 1922 was admitted as a member to the Societe Entomologique de France and helped in the creation of L'amateur de Papillons, and with his new colleagues and friends hunted Lepidoptera in Colmars-les_Alpes, Alpes-de-Haute-Provence, Alpes-Maritimes and elsewhere. At this time, welcomed by Professor Louis Bouvier, he also began to work as a volunteer at the entomological laboratories of Muséum national d'histoire naturelle, where he worked to classify the Noctuidae and many other insect groups. By 1935 he was listed as working at the museum's entomological laboratory, and in 1943 he became a paid assistant there. His linguistic capabilities meant that he was the museum's delegate to international colloquia (1927 Congres International de Zoologie in Budapest; 1938 Congres International d'Entomology in Berlin).

One of his major contributions to the taxonomy of Lepidoptera was to use their genital armature in their classification. He began to publish entomological works in 1923 and in 1933 was awarded the Constant Prize of the Entomological Society of France for his work on the Lepidoptera subfamily, Trifinae, of the family Noctuidae (Lepidoptera). In 1938 he joined the editorial committee of the journal L'Amateur de Papillons (now Alexanor), consisting of Philippe Henriot, Ferdinand Le Cerf, Simon Le Marchand, Henri Stempffer and Léon Lhomme. A close friendship with fellow member of the editorial committee (and assassinated minister in the Vichy government), Phillipe Henriot, together with his close friendships with German entomologists led to his dismissal on 5 September 1944 from the chair of entomology at the museum, followed on 24 October 1944 by his expulsion from the Societe Entomologique de France, and he never again published in L'Amateur de Papillons. Following this, he found work in December 1945 as a translator with the French army of occupation in Austria, and in Vienna was again able to pursue his entomological work, being welcomed into the laboratory of Witburg Metzky (at the time president of the Entomological Society of Vienna). He returned to Paris in the early fifties, continuing to be shunned by the French entomological community, living for the rest of his life in a continual state of financial embarrassment. Nonetheless he continued to work on the Trifinae, and was invited by many institutions to work on their collections - Museum Alexander Koenig, Dortmund Naturhistorisches Museum, Naturmuseum Senckenberg, Zoologische Staatssammlung (Munich), Naturhistorisches Museum (Vienna), and museums in Sweden and Switzerland. Just prior to his death, Alfred Balachowsky (director of the entomology section of MNHN) obtained a position for him at the museum, together with a grant from the CNRS.

He described many new species of Trifinae of which he was the world specialist, and in 1964 established a list of French Noctuid Trifinae. Prior to his death he had sold ("en viager") his library and his collection to the Museum of Karlsruhe (thereby giving him a continuing source of money until his death, while at the same time having use of both library and collection). In 1967 the collection consisted of 29,245 specimens of Trifinae (including 171 holotypes, 1990 paratypes, 3800 genital preparations and 12000 photos). At his death he had contributed some 200 scientific papers to the entomological literature.

== Selected publications ==
- — (1964). "Noctua orbona Hfn.(1766) et Noctua comes Hb.(1809-1813) (Lép. Noctuidae). Mise au point à la suite d'un article du Pr. F. Heydemann (Contributions à l'Etude des «Noctuidae Trifinae» 149)". Bulletin de la Société linnéenne de Lyon (in French). 33 (10): 412–417. doi:10.3406/linly.1964.5662. Wikidata Q99525144.
- — (1964). "Une nouvelle race de Luperina nickerlii Freyer d'Irlande (Lép. Noctuidae)". Bulletin de la Société linnéenne de Lyon (in French). 33 (5): 184–185. doi:10.3406/linly.1964.5696. Wikidata Q99525147.
- — (1953). "Über die systematische Stellung von "Hiptelia" apfelbecki Rbl. nebst Beschreibung einer neuen Gattung. (Beiträge zur Kenntnis der "Agrotidae-Trifinae" LVII/57" (PDF). Zeitschrift der Wiener Entomologischen Gesellschaft (in German). 38: 66–70. ISSN 0373-028X. Wikidata Q111366219.
- — (1923). "Observations sur Zygaena gallica Oberth. [Lep. Zygaenidae]" (PDF). Bulletin de la Société entomologique de France. 28 (4): 67–69. doi:10.3406/bsef.1923.27126. Wikidata Q108834504.
