= Toxocampa =

Scientific classification
- Kingdom: Animalia
- Phylum: Arthropoda
- Class: Insecta
- Order: Lepidoptera
- Superfamily: Noctuoidea
- Family: Erebidae
- Subfamily: Calpinae
- Genus: Toxocampa; Guenée, 1841

Genus of moths

Toxocampa is a genus of moths of the family Noctuidae. The genus was erected by Achille Guenée in 1841. Lepidoptera and Some Other Life Forms and The Global Lepidoptera Names Index describe this name as a synonym of Lygephila.

== Description ==
Its eyes are naked and without lashes. The proboscis is well developed. Palpi obliquely upturned, where the second joint reaching vertex of head and thickly and evenly scaled. Third joint short. Frons with a short tuft. Antennae minutely ciliated in male. Thorax with a slight crest behind collar. No tufts on metathorax or abdomen. Tibia spineless. Forewing with the outer margin much excurved at center. Cilia non-crenulate.

== Species ==
- Toxocampa angustipennis
- Toxocampa angustissima
- Toxocampa craccae
- Toxocampa cucullata
- Toxocampa decolor
- Toxocampa dorsigera
- Toxocampa enormis
- Toxocampa glycyrrhizae
- Toxocampa graciosissima
- Toxocampa ichinosawana
- Toxocampa lilacina
- Toxocampa limosa
- Toxocampa lubrica
- Toxocampa lupina
- Toxocampa lusoria
- Toxocampa maxima
- Toxocampa moellendorfi
- Toxocampa pallida
- Toxocampa pastinum
- Toxocampa recta
- Toxocampa stigmata
- Toxocampa viciae
- Toxocampa vulcanea
