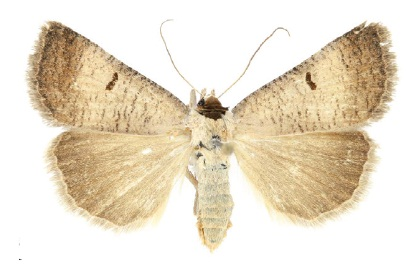
- Female
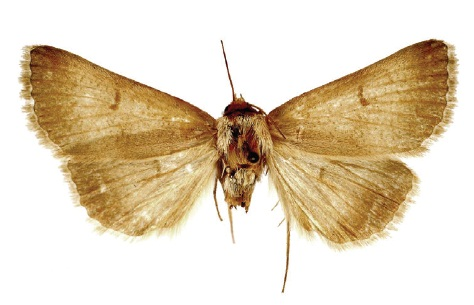
- Male

Scientific classification
- Kingdom: Animalia
- Phylum: Arthropoda
- Class: Insecta
- Order: Lepidoptera
- Superfamily: Noctuoidea
- Family: Erebidae
- Genus: Lygephila
- Species: L. fereidun

Binomial name
- Lygephila fereidun Wiltshire, 1961

= Lygephila fereidun =

Species of moth

Lygephila fereidun is a moth of the family Erebidae first described by Wiltshire in 1961. It is found in the Elburz Mountains of northern Iran.

The colour of the adults is pale straw and the wing pattern is close to Lygephila lusoria glycyrrhizae. Based on the currently known characters, L. fereidun is possibly an aberrant specimen of Lygephila pallida.
