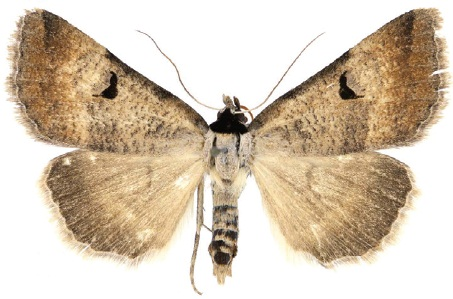
- Female
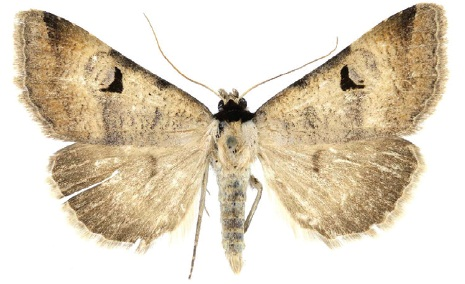
- Male

Scientific classification
- Domain: Eukaryota
- Kingdom: Animalia
- Phylum: Arthropoda
- Class: Insecta
- Order: Lepidoptera
- Superfamily: Noctuoidea
- Family: Erebidae
- Genus: Lygephila
- Species: L. colorata

Binomial name
- Lygephila colorata Babics & Ronkay, 2009

= Lygephila colorata =

Species of moth

Lygephila colorata is a moth of the family Erebidae first described by János Babics and László Aladár Ronkay in 2009. It is found in north-western Pakistan.

Adults differ from externally similar Lygephila amasina by the more elongated forewing with a pointed apex.
