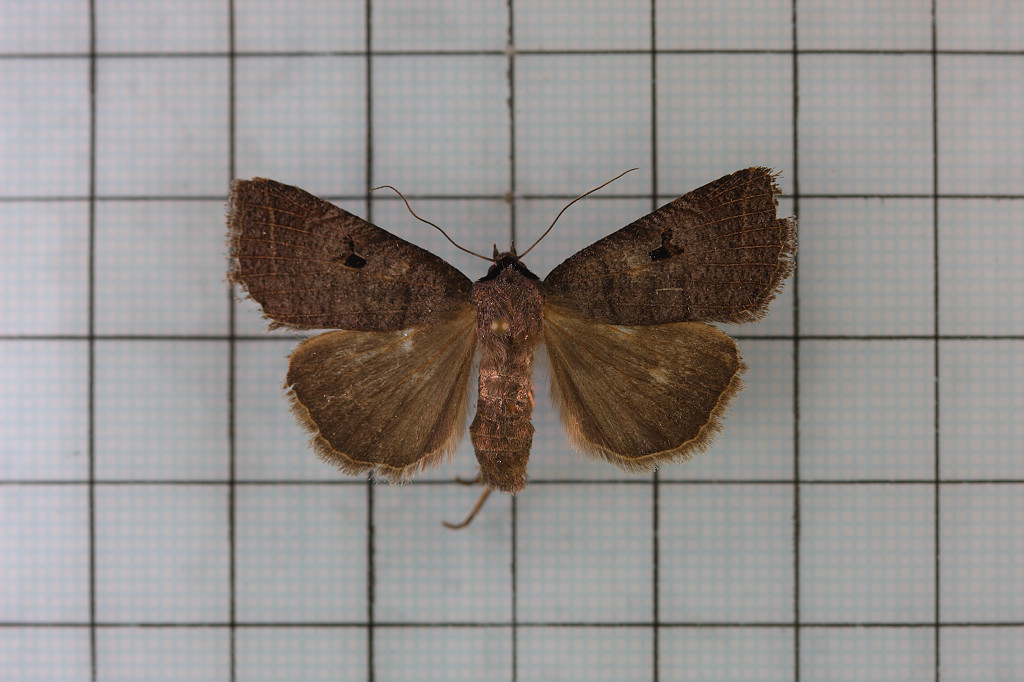

Scientific classification
- Domain: Eukaryota
- Kingdom: Animalia
- Phylum: Arthropoda
- Class: Insecta
- Order: Lepidoptera
- Superfamily: Noctuoidea
- Family: Erebidae
- Genus: Lygephila
- Species: L. kishidai

Binomial name
- Lygephila kishidai Kinoshita, 1989

= Lygephila kishidai =

Species of moth

Lygephila kishidai is a moth of the family Erebidae. It is found in Taiwan.

The length of the forewings is about 18 mm.
