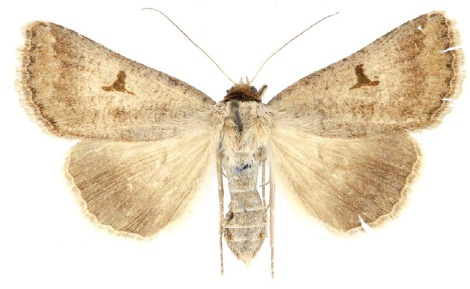
- Female
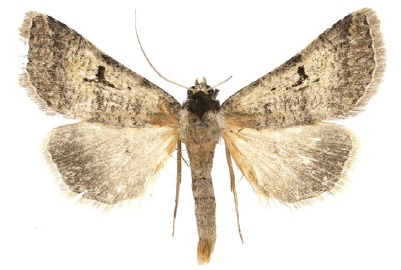
- Male

Scientific classification
- Kingdom: Animalia
- Phylum: Arthropoda
- Class: Insecta
- Order: Lepidoptera
- Superfamily: Noctuoidea
- Family: Erebidae
- Genus: Lygephila
- Species: L. subpicata

Binomial name
- Lygephila subpicata Wiltshire, 1971

Synonyms
- Lygephila lusoria subpicata Wiltshire, 1971

= Lygephila subpicata =

Species of moth

Lygephila subpicata is a moth of the family Erebidae first described by Wiltshire in 1971. It is found in northern and western Iran.

Adults differ from the sister species Lygephila pallida in the length and shape of the ampulla, and in vesica and aedeagus structure.
