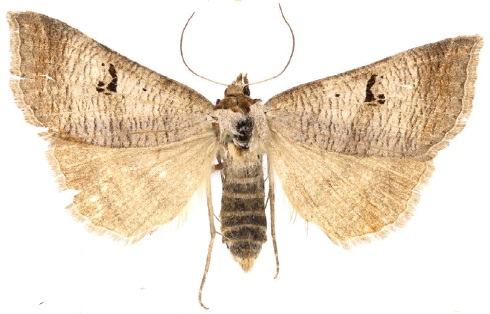
- Female
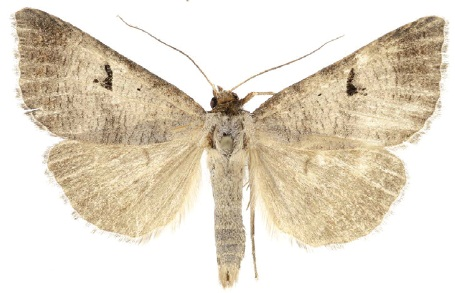
- Male

Scientific classification
- Domain: Eukaryota
- Kingdom: Animalia
- Phylum: Arthropoda
- Class: Insecta
- Order: Lepidoptera
- Superfamily: Noctuoidea
- Family: Erebidae
- Genus: Lygephila
- Species: L. alaica

Binomial name
- Lygephila alaica Remm, 1983

= Lygephila alaica =

Species of moth

Lygephila alaica is a moth of the family Erebidae first described by Hans Remm in 1983. It is found in Tajikistan and Uzbekistan.
