= Lygephila dorsigera =

Scientific classification
- Kingdom: Animalia
- Phylum: Arthropoda
- Class: Insecta
- Order: Lepidoptera
- Superfamily: Noctuoidea
- Family: Erebidae
- Genus: Lygephila
- Species: L. dorsigera

Binomial name
- Lygephila dorsigera Walker, 1865

Synonyms
- Asticta dorsigera Walker, 1865; Toxocampa dorsigera Walker, 1865

Species of moth

Lygephila dorsigera is a moth of the family Erebidae first described by Francis Walker in 1865. It is found in Sri Lanka and Taiwan.
