= Toxocampinae =

Scientific classification
- Kingdom: Animalia
- Phylum: Arthropoda
- Class: Insecta
- Order: Lepidoptera
- Superfamily: Noctuoidea
- Family: Erebidae
- Subfamily: Toxocampinae; Guenée, 1852

Subfamily of moths

The Toxocampinae are a subfamily of moths in the family Erebidae. Moths in the subfamily typically have a primitive form of genital claspers similar to those of some subfamilies of the Noctuidae.

== Taxonomy ==
Morphological analysis previously classified the subfamily as the tribe Toxocampini of the former subfamily Catocalinae within Erebidae. Phylogenetic analysis supports the subfamily as a clade within Erebidae but outside the Catocalinae (now called the Erebinae).

== Genera ==
- Anumeta
- Apopestes
- Autophila
- Lygephila
- Tathorhynchus
