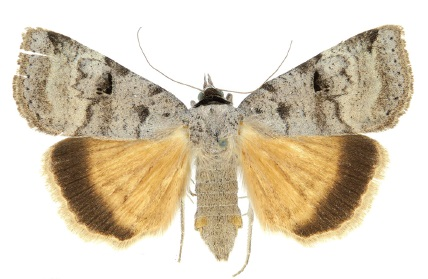
- Female
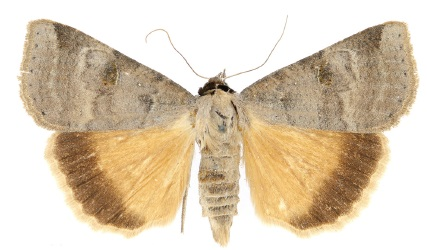
- Male

Scientific classification
- Domain: Eukaryota
- Kingdom: Animalia
- Phylum: Arthropoda
- Class: Insecta
- Order: Lepidoptera
- Superfamily: Noctuoidea
- Family: Erebidae
- Genus: Lygephila
- Species: L. kazachkaratavika

Binomial name
- Lygephila kazachkaratavika YuL Stshetkin & YuYu Stshetkin, 1994

Synonyms
- Lygephila lubrosa kazachkaratavika YuL Stshetkin & YuYu Stshetkin, 1994

= Lygephila kazachkaratavika =

Species of moth

Lygephila kazachkaratavika is a moth of the family Erebidae first described by YuL Stshetkin and YuYu Stshetkin in 1994. It is found in Kazakhstan and Kyrgyzstan.

The wingspan is 41–44 mm. The forewings are contrastingly marked and vary in colouration from mottled light greyish brown to uniform dark brown. The hindwings are ochreous with a distinct transverse line and a small discal spot.
