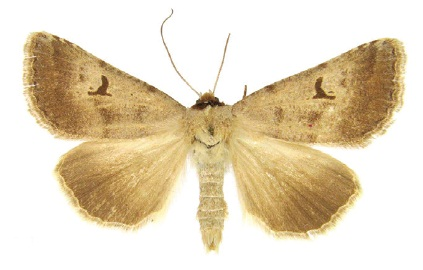

Scientific classification
- Domain: Eukaryota
- Kingdom: Animalia
- Phylum: Arthropoda
- Class: Insecta
- Order: Lepidoptera
- Superfamily: Noctuoidea
- Family: Erebidae
- Genus: Lygephila
- Species: L. moellendorffi

Binomial name
- Lygephila moellendorffi (Herz, 1904)

Synonyms
- Toxocampa moellendorffi Herz, 1904; Lygephila moellendorfii; Lygephila moellendorfi

= Lygephila moellendorffi =

Species of moth

Lygephila moellendorffi is a moth of the family Erebidae, genus Lygephila first described by Alfred Otto Herz in 1904. It is found in North Korea.

== Etymology ==
The species was named in honour of Paul von Moellendorff.
