= Autophila ligaminosa =

Scientific classification
- Domain: Eukaryota
- Kingdom: Animalia
- Phylum: Arthropoda
- Class: Insecta
- Order: Lepidoptera
- Superfamily: Noctuoidea
- Family: Erebidae
- Genus: Autophila
- Species: A. ligaminosa

Binomial name
- Autophila ligaminosa (Eversmann, 1851)

Synonyms
- Cheirophanes ligaminosa; Amphipyra ligaminosa

Species of moth

Autophila ligaminosa is a moth of the family Erebidae first described by Eduard Friedrich Eversmann in 1851. It is found from the Near East and Middle East to south-eastern Russia, the Balkans, Afghanistan, the United Arab Emirates and Oman.

There is one generation per year. Adults are on wing from May to July.

== Subspecies ==
- Autophila ligaminosa subligaminosa
- Autophila ligaminosa ankara
- Autophila ligaminosa rhodochroa
- Autophila ligaminosa amianta
