= Lygephila yoshimotoi =

Scientific classification
- Kingdom: Animalia
- Phylum: Arthropoda
- Clade: Pancrustacea
- Class: Insecta
- Order: Lepidoptera
- Superfamily: Noctuoidea
- Family: Erebidae
- Genus: Lygephila
- Species: L. yoshimotoi

Binomial name
- Lygephila yoshimotoi Kinoshita, 1989

Species of moth

Lygephila yoshimotoi Kinoshita, 1989

Lygephila yoshimotoi is a moth of the family Erebidae. It is found in Taiwan.

The length of the forewings is about 17 mm.
