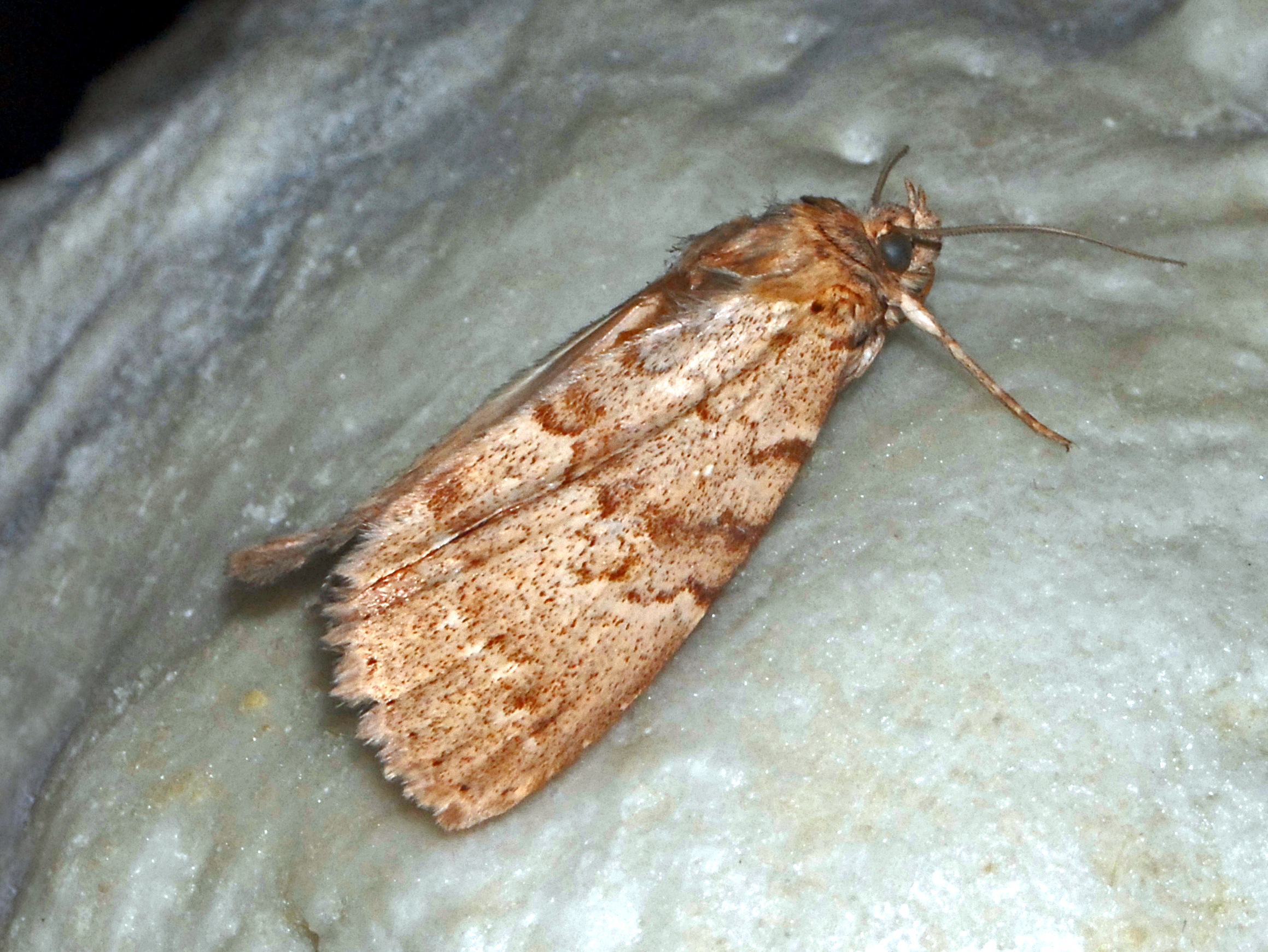
- Dorsal view

Scientific classification
- Kingdom: Animalia
- Phylum: Arthropoda
- Clade: Pancrustacea
- Class: Insecta
- Order: Lepidoptera
- Superfamily: Noctuoidea
- Family: Erebidae
- Genus: Apopestes
- Species: A. spectrum

Binomial name
- Apopestes spectrum (Esper, 1787)

Synonyms
- Noctua spectrum; Phalaena genistae; Phalaena socrus

= Apopestes spectrum =

Species of moth

Apopestes spectrum is a species of moth in the family Erebidae first described by Eugenius Johann Christoph Esper in 1787.

== Description ==
Apopestes spectrum has a wingspan of 74–82 mm. The forewings of this large moth are light brown, with dark brown markings. In the postdiscal area near the inner edge there is a dark spot. The hindwings have a pale brown color. The caterpillars are slender and yellow, with two black stripes and irregular black markings on each side. The head shows whitish and black dots. The chrysalis is reddish brown.

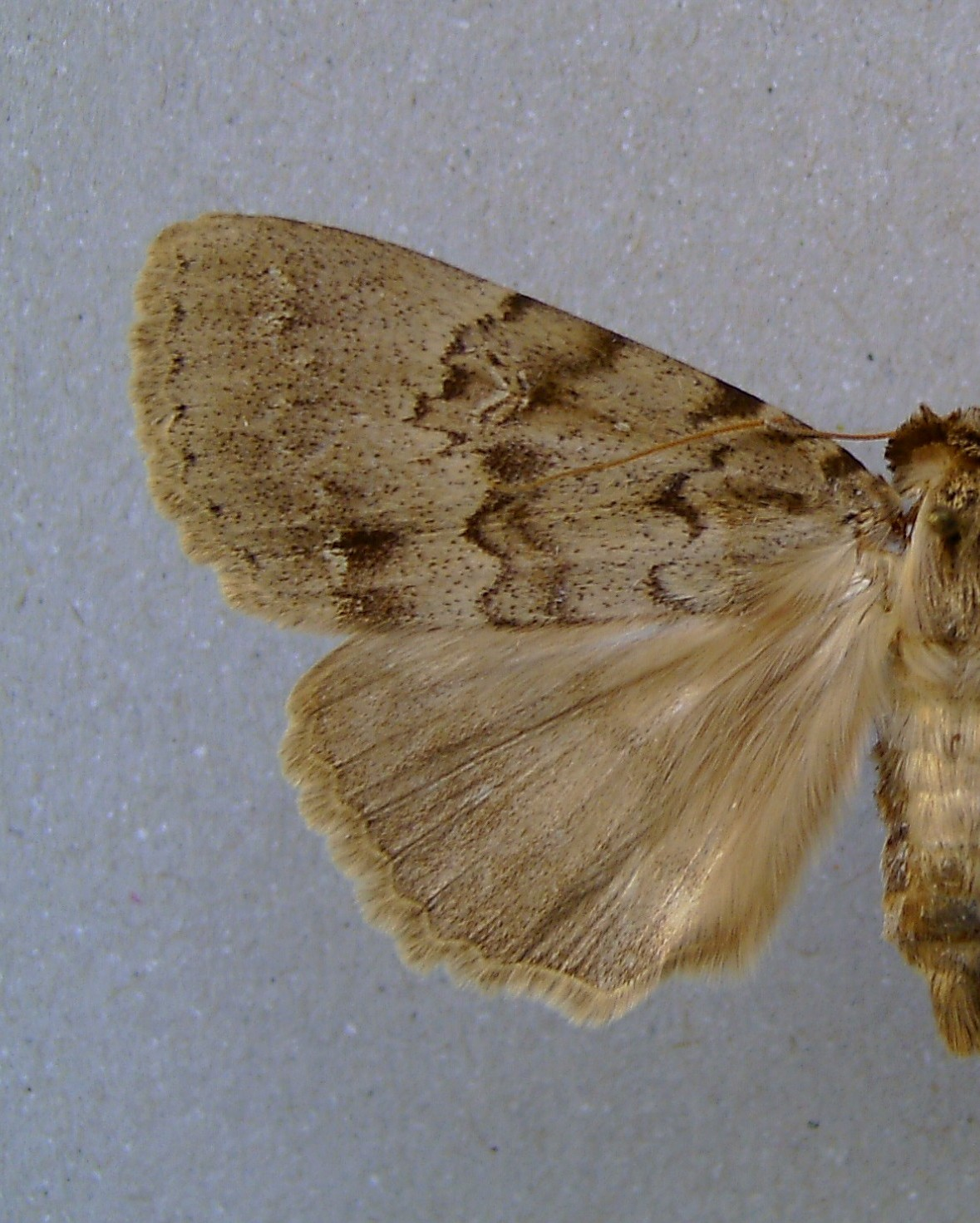
Dorsal view on wings

There is one generation per year (univoltine). Caterpillars can be found from late April to June. They feed on Papilionaceae species, including Genista, Sarothamnus, Spaltium, Glycyrrhiza and Retama raetam. The moths overwinter from July up to March of the following year.

== Distribution ==
This species has a Mediterranean distribution. It can be found in many European countries (Albania, Bosnia, Bulgaria, Croatia, France, Greece, Italy, Portugal, Slovenia, Spain, and Switzerland) and from Maghreb, to western Turkey, Lebanon, Israel and Jordan.

== Habitat ==
In the valleys of the southern Alps this moth lives in warm areas up to an elevation of about 800 meters.
