= Autophila cerealis =

Scientific classification
- Domain: Eukaryota
- Kingdom: Animalia
- Phylum: Arthropoda
- Class: Insecta
- Order: Lepidoptera
- Superfamily: Noctuoidea
- Family: Erebidae
- Genus: Autophila
- Species: A. cerealis

Binomial name
- Autophila cerealis (Staudinger, 1871)

Synonyms
- Spintherops cerealis; Autophila amseli

Species of moth

Autophila cerealis is a moth of the family Erebidae first described by Otto Staudinger in 1871. It is found in the Near East and Middle East, from Turkey and the Levant to Central Asia and the Arabian Peninsula.

There are two generations per year. Adults are on wing from October to June.

The larvae feed on Salvia species.
