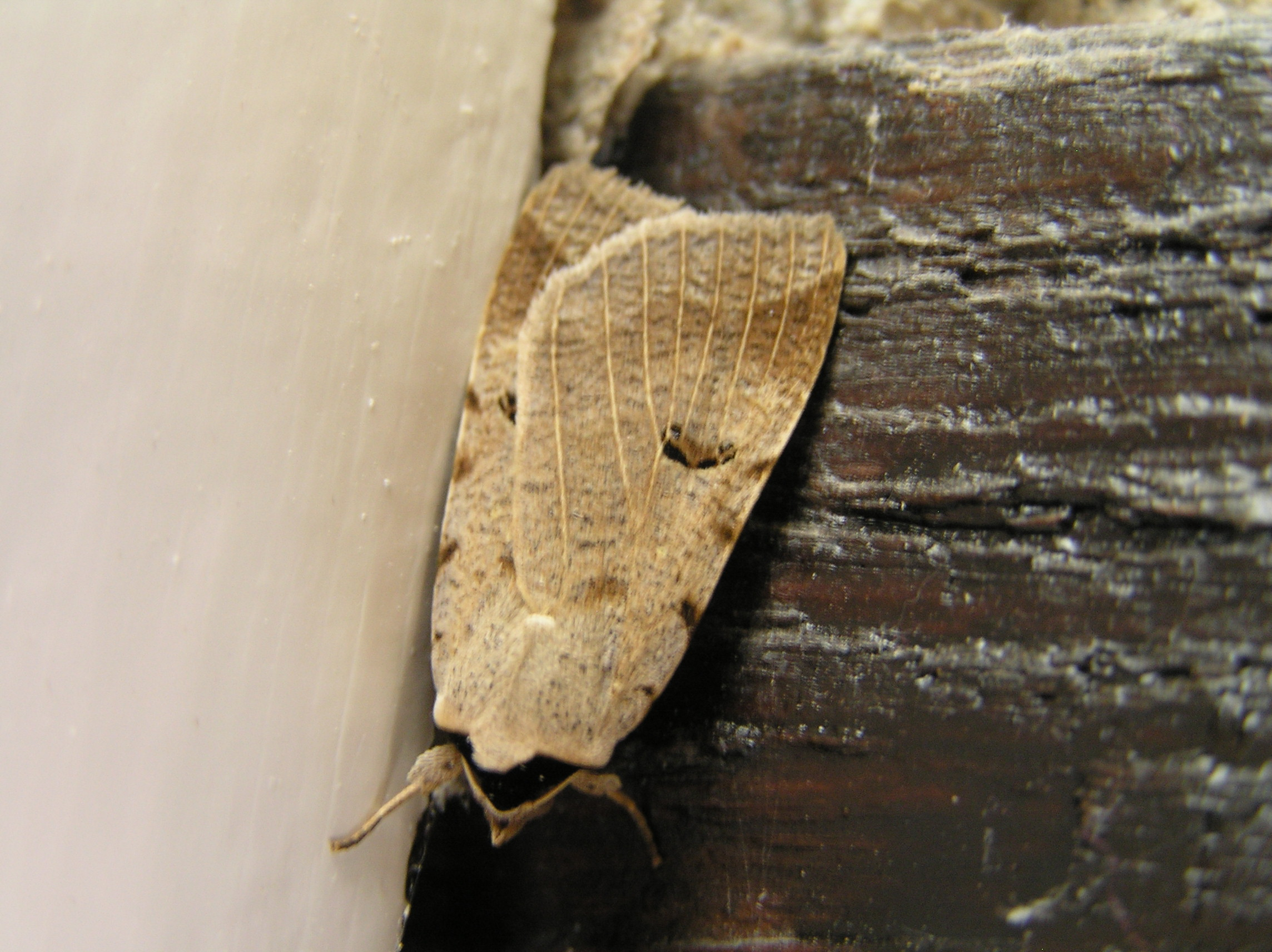

Scientific classification
- Kingdom: Animalia
- Phylum: Arthropoda
- Class: Insecta
- Order: Lepidoptera
- Superfamily: Noctuoidea
- Family: Erebidae
- Genus: Lygephila
- Species: L. craccae

Binomial name
- Lygephila craccae (Denis & Schiffermüller, 1775)

Synonyms
- Noctua craccae; Phalaena nigricollis; Ophiusa craccae; Toxocampa craccae; Lygephila herrerai

= Lygephila craccae =

Scarce blackneck

Species of moth

Lygephila craccae, the scarce blackneck, is a moth of the family Erebidae. It is found in temperate Europe and across the Palearctic to the Altai Mountains, Korea, Japan and China.

== Technical description and variation ==
O. craccae F. Larger than viciae. Forewing darker grey, with a slaty violet tinge, striated and dusted with darker; the veins pale; costal spots blackish; lines very faint, except the paler subterminal, and that often only shown by the darker shade preceding it; hindwing paler, sometimes with a yellowish tinge, with a smoky fuscous terminal border; — ab. immaculata Stgr., like caecula Stgr., the aberration of viciae, has no black edging to the reniform stigma and the costal spots paler; — subsp. laevigata subsp. nov. [Warren] from the South Tyrol, is large, with the forewing uniformly slate coloured, and without darker dusting or striation; in a female from Uralsk, received from M. Bartel, subsp. grisea subsp. nov. [Warren], the forewing has the costal spots prominently black, the inner and outer lines dark fuscous and distinct, the space between them and the terminal area both dark grey, contrasting strongly with the paler basal area and pale outward edging of the outer line; the reniform stigma has the inner edge finely black, but is filled up with the dark grey of the median area, its outer edge being represented by two or three black points only; the pale veins show up distinctly in the dark grey suffusion; the hindwing is wholly dark fuscous; the example is only as large as average viciae, and may be specifically distinct; two other forms appear to require a distinctive name; ab. brunnea ab. nov., instead of the typical grey ground colour, is brown, sometimes with a rufous tinge; while subsp. lutosa subsp. nov. [Warren] from the South of France, is luteous grey in the forewing and luteous ochreous in the hindwing. Larva pale yellowish grey; dorsal stripe broad, grey brown, divided by a fine dark brown line with pale edges;on the sides of segments 5, 6, 7, and 10 an oblique blackish streak; on segment 12 a triangular yellowish white blotch; a brown shading below the spiracles.

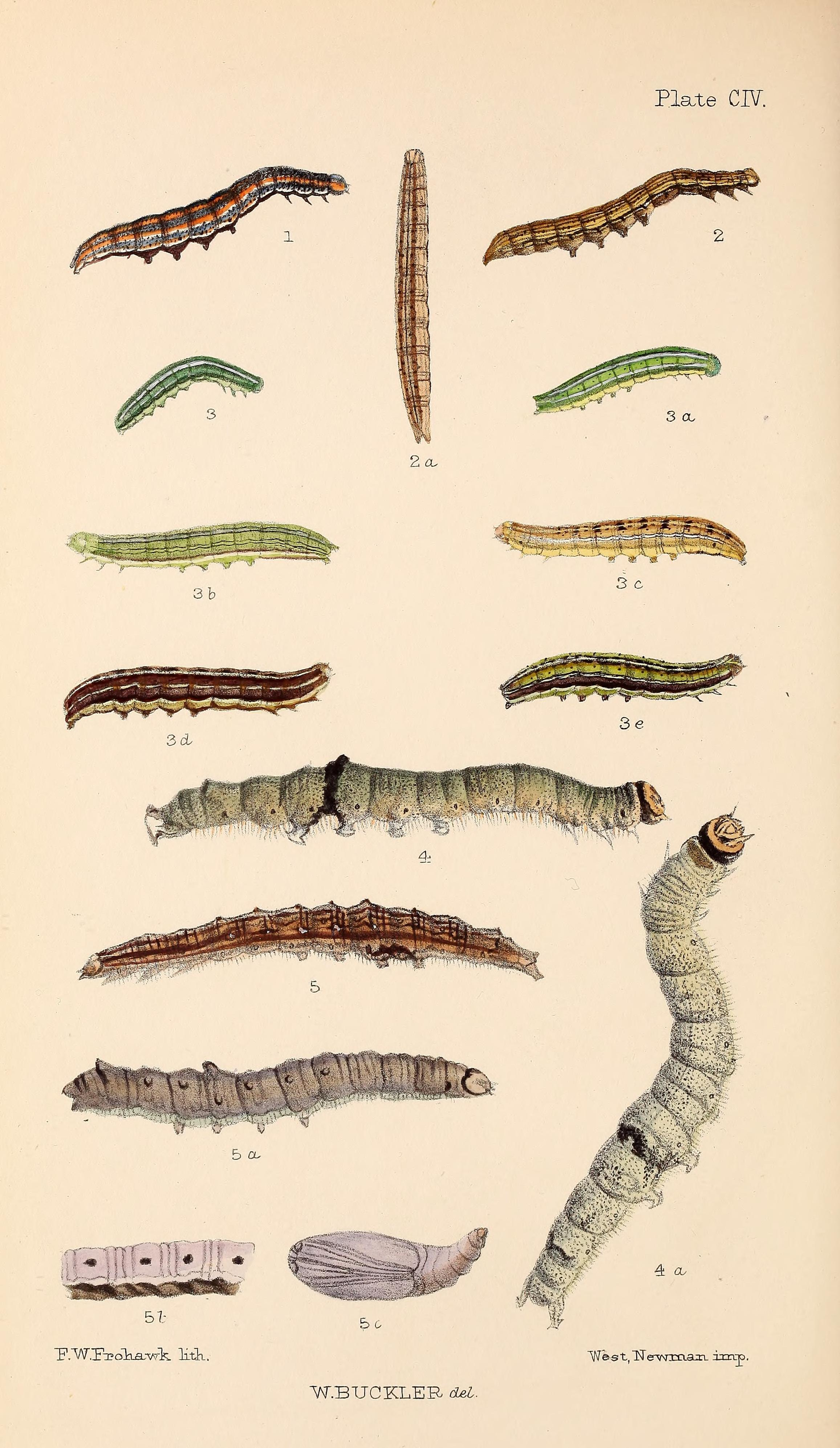
Figs.2, 2a larvae after last moult

== Subspecies ==
- Lygephila craccae craccae
- ?Lygephila craccae grisea
- ?Lygephila craccae laevigata
- Lygephila craccae riata
- ?Lygephila craccae centralasiae

== Biology ==
There is one generation per year depending on the location. Adults are on wing in early summer.

The larvae feed on Vicia, Coronilla, Astragalus and Lathyrus species.
