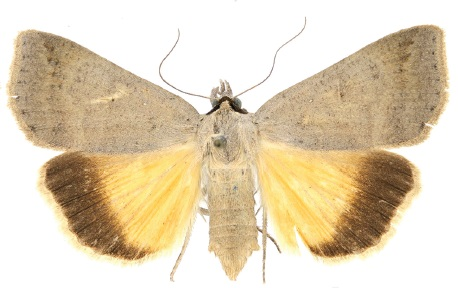
- Female Lygephila lubrosa lubrosa
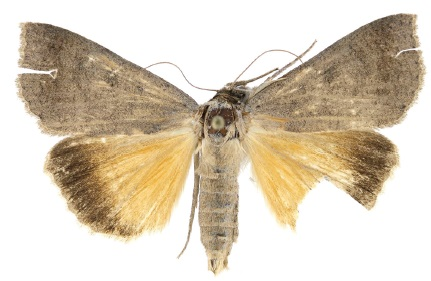
- Male Lygephila lubrosa lubrosa

Scientific classification
- Domain: Eukaryota
- Kingdom: Animalia
- Phylum: Arthropoda
- Class: Insecta
- Order: Lepidoptera
- Superfamily: Noctuoidea
- Family: Erebidae
- Genus: Lygephila
- Species: L. lubrosa

Binomial name
- Lygephila lubrosa (Staudinger, 1901)

Synonyms
- Toxocampa lubrica var. lubrosa Staudinger, 1901

= Lygephila lubrosa =

Species of moth

Lygephila lubrosa is a species of moth in the family Erebidae first described by Otto Staudinger in 1901. It is found in Kazakhstan and Tajikistan.

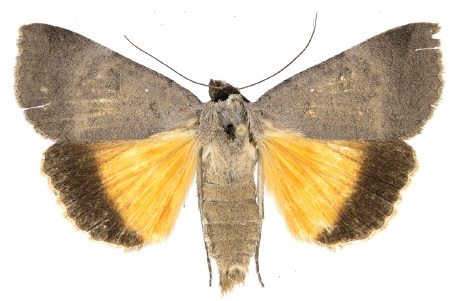
Lygephila lubrosa orbonaria

The wingspan is 42–46 mm for L. l. lubrosa and 34–43 mm for L. l. orbonaria. The forewings are almost unicolorous with a poorly developed wing pattern. The subbasal line is represented by groups of dark scales on the veins. The antemedial line is semicircular and the reniform stigma is small and indistinct. The orbicular stigma is small and dot-like and the postmedial and subterminal lines are distinct and the terminal line consists of a row of black dots on the veins. The hindwings are pale ochreous.

== Subspecies ==
- Lygephila lubrosa lubrosa (Kazakhstan: valley of the river Ili)
- Lygephila lubrosa orbonaria Stshetkin YuL & Stshetkin YuYu, 1994 (south-western Tajikistan: Pianj river valley)
