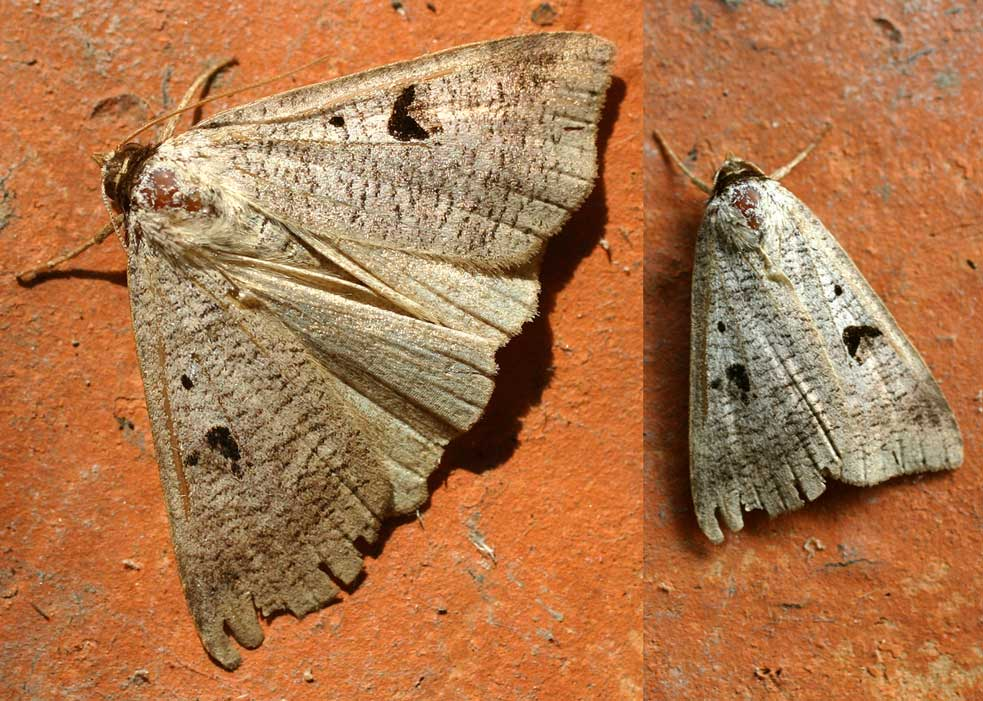

Scientific classification
- Domain: Eukaryota
- Kingdom: Animalia
- Phylum: Arthropoda
- Class: Insecta
- Order: Lepidoptera
- Superfamily: Noctuoidea
- Family: Erebidae
- Genus: Lygephila
- Species: L. pastinum

Binomial name
- Lygephila pastinum (Treitschke, 1826)

= Lygephila pastinum =

Blackneck

Species of moth

Lygephila pastinum, the blackneck, is a moth of the family Erebidae. The species was first described by Georg Friedrich Treitschke in 1826. It is found in Europe and across the Palearctic Siberia, the Russian Far East, Japan and China.

== Technical description and variation ==
O. pastinum Tr. (= lusoria Hbn. nec L.) . Forewing pale luteous grey covered with dark vermiculations; the costa and terminal area brownish grey; inner line outwardly curved, greyish brown, often obscure; outer line dark edged with pale, outcurved above, indented on submedian fold, followed by a diffuse dark shade; the subterminal line hardly distinct; orbicular stigma a black dot; reniform a black lunule, its lower end produced outwards and followed by two black points; hindwing pale brownish grey, with an indistinct outer pale line; the form astragali Rmb., from Spain, is more densely covered with dark striae on the forewing, of which the terminal spots are hardly visible; on the other hand, dilutior Stgr., from the Kentei Mts., has paler, less marked, forewings; ab. decolor ab. nov. (68 f) is much paler and without any brown tinge: nearly a score of this form were taken in July and August 1901—1903 at Tarasp in the Engadine by Mr. Rothschild and Mr. Haktert; they may be identical with ab. dilutior Stgr. from Kentei. Larva pale yellowish grey, dotted with black, with a row of yellow spots in the middle and a row of small yellow spots on each side of the back; laterally with a broad white grey-mottled black-dotted stripe above, and beneath an orange stripe dotted with white and edged below with yellow; also a black stripe above the feet. The wingspan is 37–42 mm. The length of the forewings is 18–21 mm.

== Biology ==
The moth flies in two generations from late March to mid August and from September and October.

The larvae feed on various herbaceous plants such as Vicia cracca and Lathyrus pratensis.

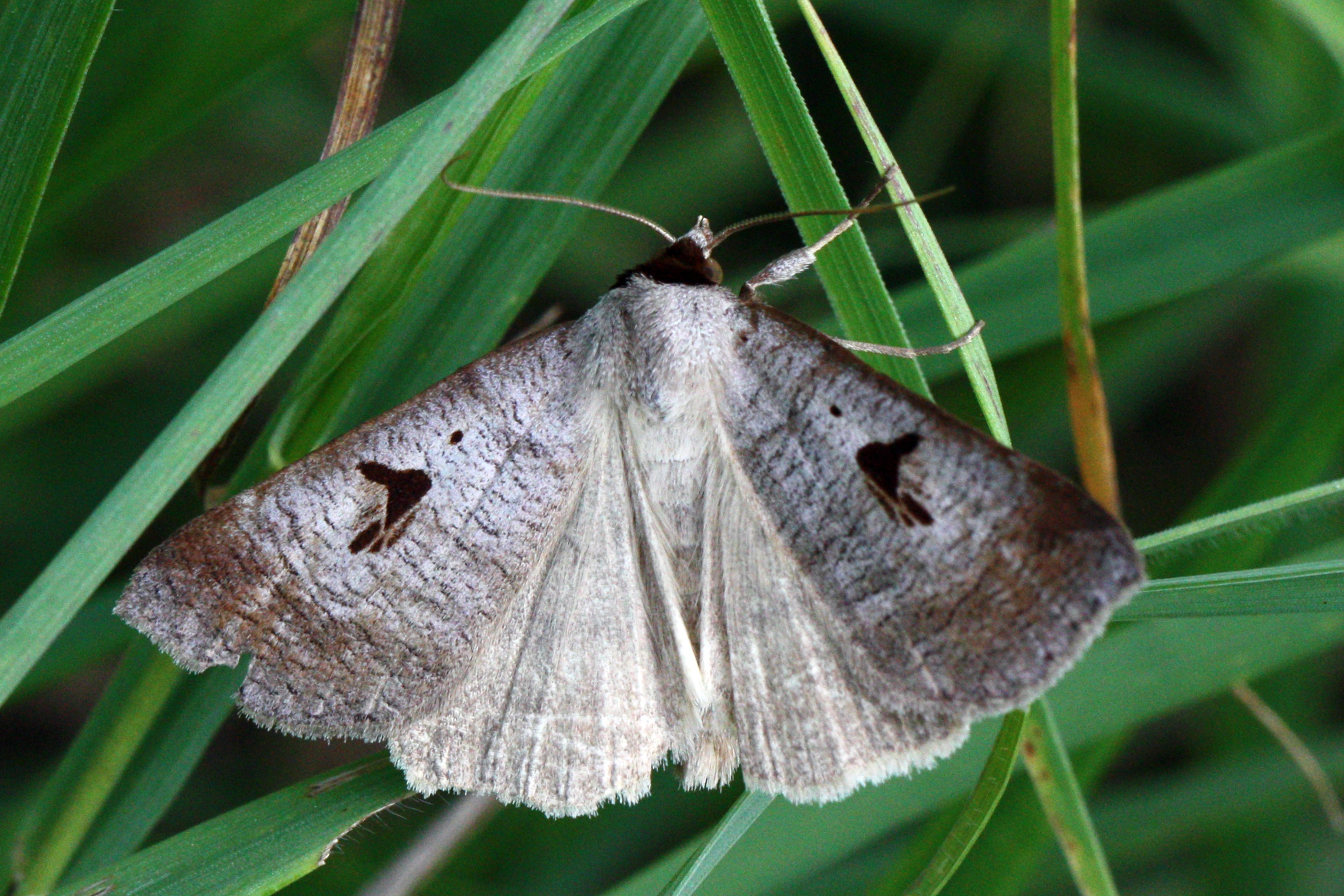

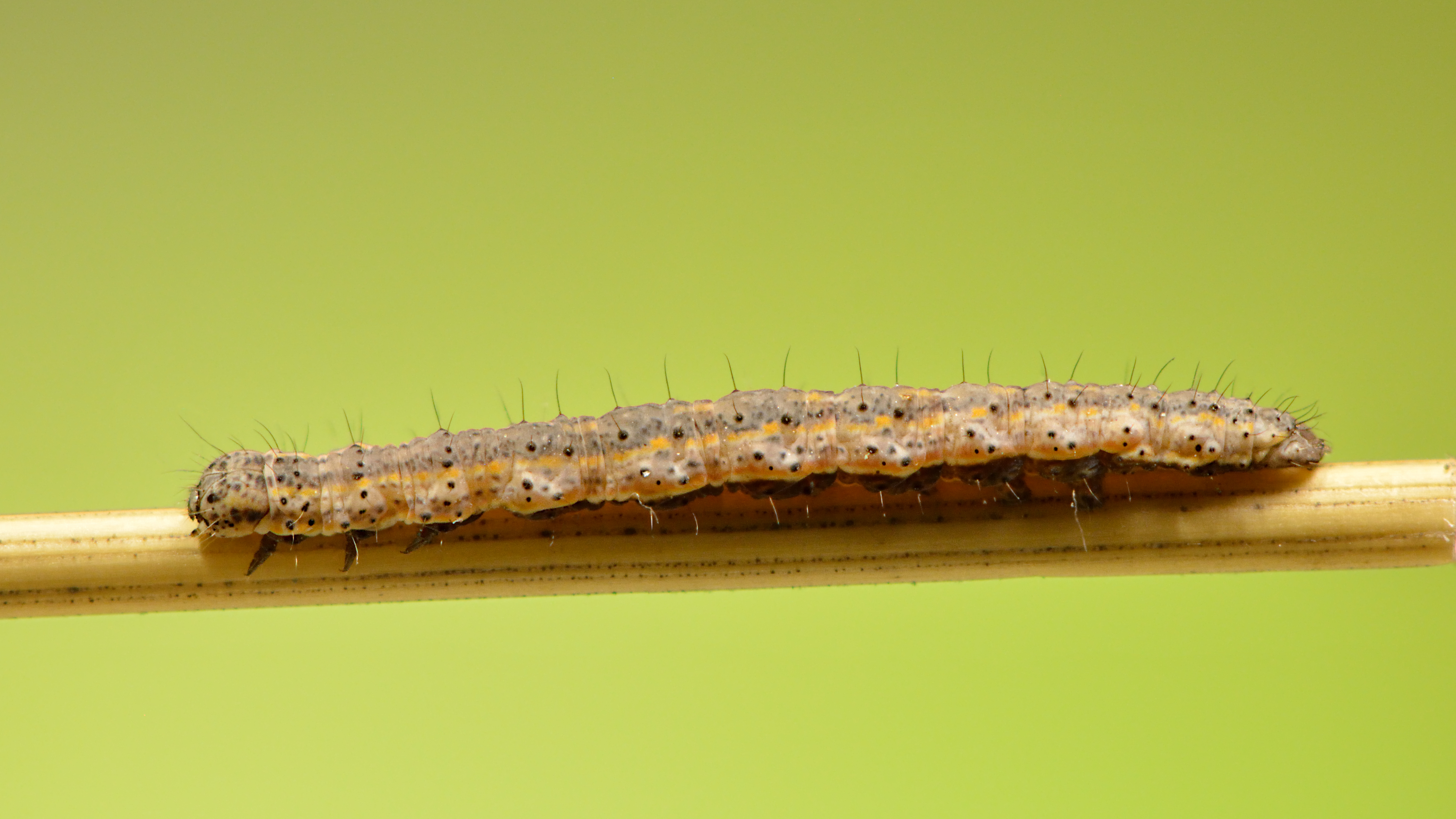
Caterpillar

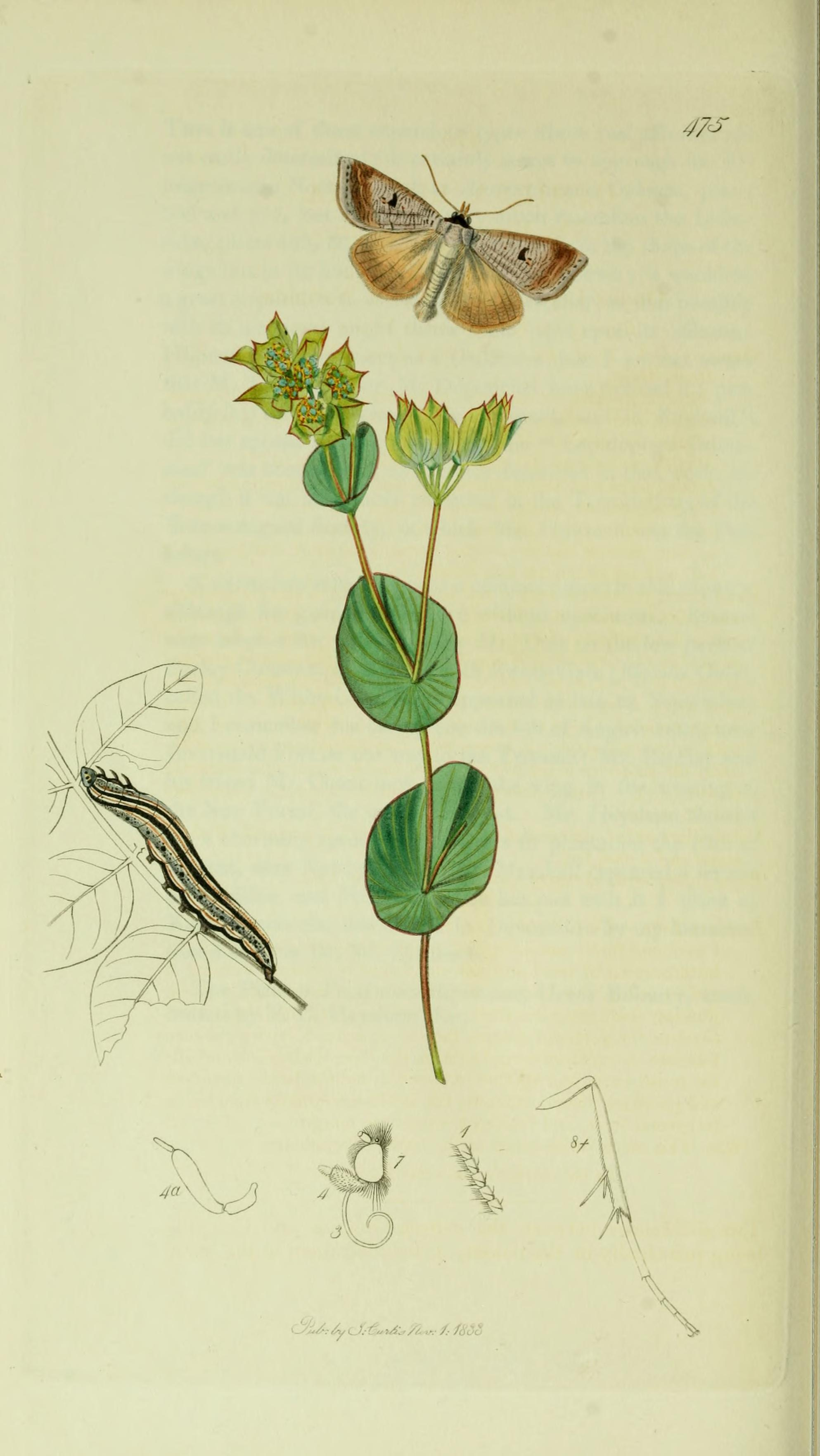
Illustration from John Curtis's British Entomology Volume 5

== Notes ==
1. The flight season refers to Belgium and the Netherlands. This may vary in other parts of the range.
