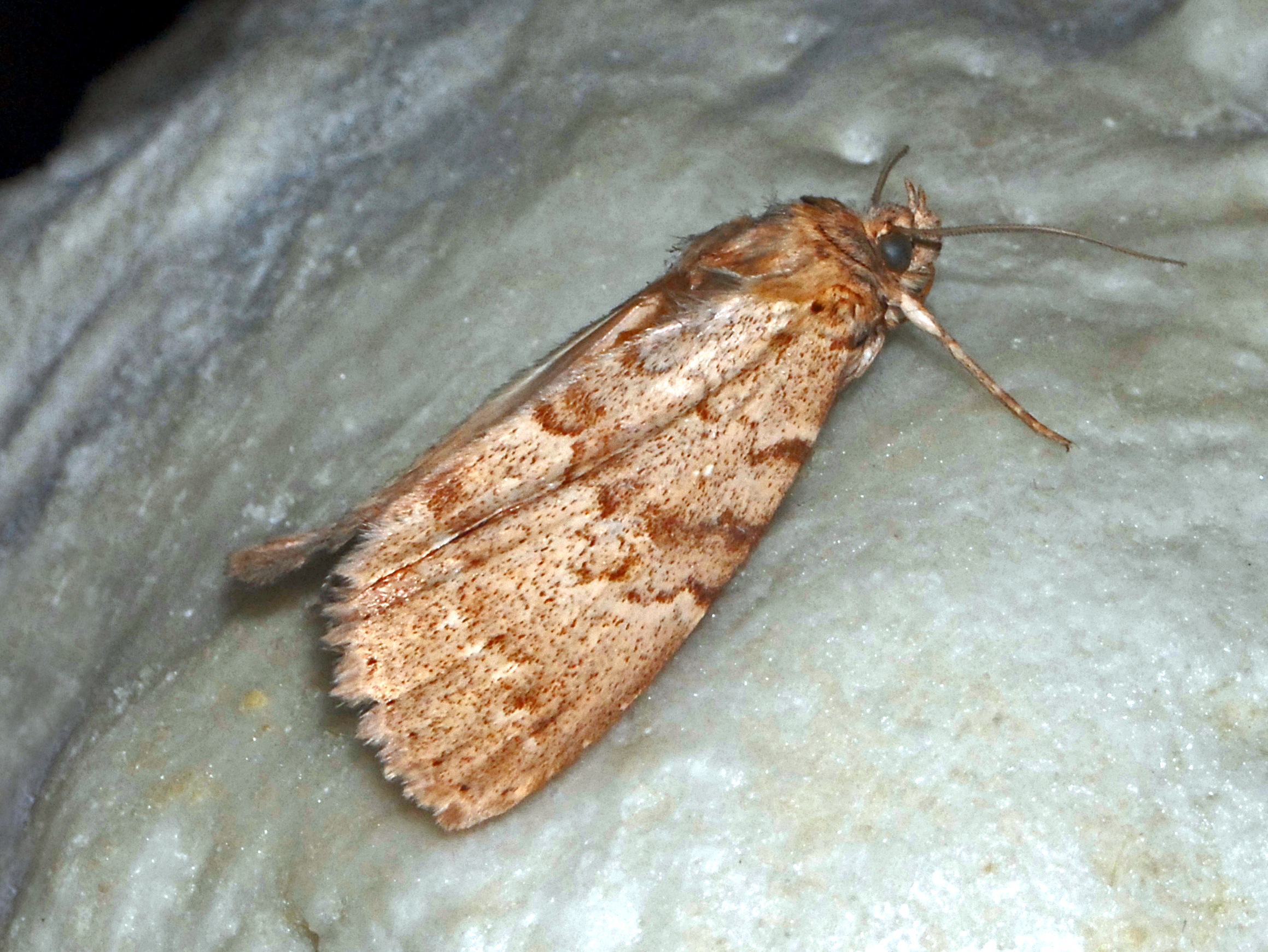

Scientific classification
- Kingdom: Animalia
- Phylum: Arthropoda
- Clade: Pancrustacea
- Class: Insecta
- Order: Lepidoptera
- Superfamily: Noctuoidea
- Family: Erebidae
- Subfamily: Toxocampinae
- Genus: Apopestes; Hübner, [1823]

Synonyms
- Spintherops Boisduval, 1840

= Apopestes =

Genus of insects

Apopestes is a genus of moths in the family Erebidae.

== Species ==
- Apopestes centralasiae Warren, 1913
- Apopestes curiosa
- Apopestes indica Moore, 1883
- Apopestes koreana Herz, 1904
- Apopestes noe Ronkay, 1990
- Apopestes phantasma Eversmann, 1843
- Apopestes spectrum Esper, 1787
