= Lygephila salax =

Scientific classification
- Kingdom: Animalia
- Phylum: Arthropoda
- Clade: Pancrustacea
- Class: Insecta
- Order: Lepidoptera
- Superfamily: Noctuoidea
- Family: Erebidae
- Genus: Lygephila
- Species: L. salax

Binomial name
- Lygephila salax (Guenée, 1852)

Synonyms
- Toxocampa salax Guenée, 1852; Graphiphora immitis Walker, 1857

Species of moth

Lygephila salax is a moth of the family Erebidae.

== Distribution ==
It is found in Africa, where it is known from South Africa, Sierra Leone, and Réunion.

Its wingspan is 32–36 mm.
