= Autophila limbata =

Scientific classification
- Domain: Eukaryota
- Kingdom: Animalia
- Phylum: Arthropoda
- Class: Insecta
- Order: Lepidoptera
- Superfamily: Noctuoidea
- Family: Erebidae
- Genus: Autophila
- Species: A. limbata

Binomial name
- Autophila limbata (Staudinger, 1871)

Synonyms
- Spintherops dilucita limbata

Species of moth

Autophila limbata is a moth of the family Noctuidae first described by Otto Staudinger in 1871. It is found in southern France, southern Italy, the Iberian Peninsula, Greece, the Crimea, the Near East, Iran, Transcaucasia and Turkmenistan.

There is one generation per year. Adults are on wing from May to July.

The larvae feed on Astragalus echinus and Onobrychis species.

== Subspecies ==
- Autophila limbata limbata
- Autophila limbata lydia
