= Autophila libanotica =

Scientific classification
- Domain: Eukaryota
- Kingdom: Animalia
- Phylum: Arthropoda
- Class: Insecta
- Order: Lepidoptera
- Superfamily: Noctuoidea
- Family: Erebidae
- Genus: Autophila
- Species: A. libanotica

Binomial name
- Autophila libanotica (Staudinger, 1901)

Synonyms
- Apopestes dilucida libanotica; Autophila osthelderi libnopsis

Species of moth

Autophila libanotica is a moth of the family Erebidae first described by Otto Staudinger in 1901. It is found from Turkey to Turkmenistan, Afghanistan, Pakistan Iran, northern Greece, Lebanon and Israel.

There is one generation per year. Adults are on wing from June to October.

== Subspecies ==
- Autophila libanotica libanotica
- Autophila libanotica osthelderi
