= Autophila anaphanes =

Scientific classification
- Domain: Eukaryota
- Kingdom: Animalia
- Phylum: Arthropoda
- Class: Insecta
- Order: Lepidoptera
- Superfamily: Noctuoidea
- Family: Erebidae
- Genus: Autophila
- Species: A. anaphanes

Binomial name
- Autophila anaphanes Boursin, 1940

Synonyms
- Cheirophanes anaphanes

Species of moth

Autophila anaphanes is a moth of the family Erebidae first described by Charles Boursin in 1940. It is found in the eastern part of the Mediterranean, including the Balkans, Cyprus, Turkey, Lebanon and Israel.

There is one generation per year. Adults are on wing from April to June.

The larvae feed on Genista and Ulex species.

== Subspecies ==
- Autophila anaphanes anaphanes
- Autophila anaphanes cypriaca
- Autophila anaphanes cretica (Crete)
