= Autophila pauli =

Scientific classification
- Domain: Eukaryota
- Kingdom: Animalia
- Phylum: Arthropoda
- Class: Insecta
- Order: Lepidoptera
- Superfamily: Noctuoidea
- Family: Erebidae
- Genus: Autophila
- Species: A. pauli

Binomial name
- Autophila pauli Boursin, 1940

Synonyms
- Cheirophanes pauli

Species of moth

Autophila pauli is a moth of the family Erebidae first described by Charles Boursin in 1940. It is found in arid areas of Jordan, Israel, Sinai, and Egypt.

There are probably two generations per year. Adults are on wing from January to August.
