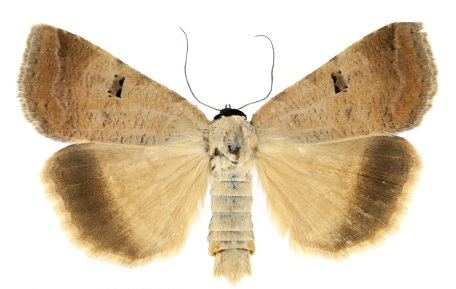
- Female
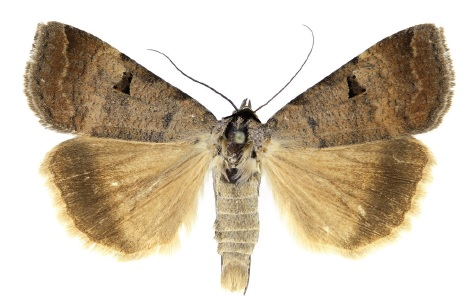
- Male

Scientific classification
- Domain: Eukaryota
- Kingdom: Animalia
- Phylum: Arthropoda
- Class: Insecta
- Order: Lepidoptera
- Superfamily: Noctuoidea
- Family: Erebidae
- Genus: Lygephila
- Species: L. lubrica

Binomial name
- Lygephila lubrica (Freyer, 1842)

Synonyms
- Ophiusa lubrica Freyer, 1846; Toxocampa lubrica var. sublubrica Staudinger, 1896

= Lygephila lubrica =

Species of moth

Lygephila lubrica is a moth of the family Erebidae first described by Christian Friedrich Freyer in 1842. It is found from the Zaporizhia region of Ukraine to the Rostov, Samara and Povolzhie regions to the Ural of Russia through Kazakhstan, the Russian Altai to northern Mongolia.

The wingspan is 37–50 mm. The forewings typically display a brownish-grey hue, occasionally appearing dark brown. The subbasal line may be faint, while the antemedial line is curved, comprising two elongated patches. The medial fascia are diffuse, often accompanied by two costal patches. The reniform stigma is triangular and dark brown, with satellite streak-like spots on the outer margin. The orbicular stigma has the form of a small white dot and the postmedial line is distinct. The subterminal line has a light fascia and the terminal line has the form of a black sinuous stripe. The hindwings vary from brown to greyish brown, with a distinct transverse line, as well as a narrow discal spot.
