= Autophila =

Scientific classification
- Kingdom: Animalia
- Phylum: Arthropoda
- Clade: Pancrustacea
- Class: Insecta
- Order: Lepidoptera
- Superfamily: Noctuoidea
- Family: Erebidae
- Subfamily: Toxocampinae
- Genus: Autophila; Hübner, [1823]

Synonyms
- Cheirophanes Boursin, 1955

Genus of moths

Autophila is a genus of moths in the family Erebidae.

== Species ==
- Autophila afghana Ronkay, 1986
- Autophila anaphanes Boursin, 1940
- Autophila asiatica (Staudinger, 1888)
- Autophila banghaasi Boursin, 1940
- Autophila berioi Bytinski-Salz, 1937
- Autophila cataphanes (Hübner, [1813])
- Autophila cerealis (Staudinger, 1871)
- Autophila chamaephanes Boursin, 1940
- Autophila cinnamonea Ronkay, 1989
- Autophila cryptica Ronkay, 1986
- Autophila cymaenotaenia Boursin, 1940
- Autophila deleta Benedek & Ronkay, 2001
- Autophila depressa (Püngeler, 1914)
- Autophila dilucida (Hübner, [1808])
- Autophila einsleri Amsel, 1935
- Autophila eremocharis Boursin, 1940
- Autophila eremochroa Boursin, 1940
- Autophila eurytaenia Boursin, 1963
- Autophila fuscolampra Hacker & Ronkay, 1990
- Autophila glebicolor (Ershov, 1874)
- Autophila gracilis (Staudinger, 1874)
- Autophila himalayica (Hampson, 1894)
- Autophila hirsuta (Staudinger, 1870)
- Autophila hirsutula (Alphéraky, 1893)
- Autophila horrida Boursin, 1955
- Autophila inconspicua (Butler, 1881)
- Autophila iranica Ronkay, 1989
- Autophila laetifica (Staudinger, 1888)
- Autophila lia (Püngeler, 1906)
- Autophila libanotica (Staudinger, 1901)
- Autophila ligaminosa (Eversmann, 1851)
- Autophila limbata (Staudinger, 1871)
- Autophila maculifera (Staudinger, 1888)
- Autophila magnifica Boursin, 1963
- Autophila maura (Staudinger, 1888)
- Autophila monstruosa Boursin, 1967
- Autophila myriospea Boursin, 1940
- Autophila osthelderi Boursin, 1940
- Autophila pauli Boursin, 1940
- Autophila plattneri Boursin, 1955
- Autophila rasilis (Püngeler, 1906)
- Autophila rosea (Staudinger, 1888)
- Autophila simplex (Staudinger, 1888)
- Autophila simulata Ronkay, 1986
- Autophila sinesafida Wiltshire, 1952
- Autophila subfusca (Christoph, 1893)
- Autophila tancrei Boursin, 1940
- Autophila tetrastigma Boursin, 1940
- Autophila umbrifera (Kollar, 1848)
- Autophila vartianae Ronkay, 1986
- Autophila vespertalis (Staudinger, 1896)
- Autophila xena Ronkay, 1986
- Autophila xenomima Ronkay, 1989
