= Autophila einsleri =

Scientific classification
- Domain: Eukaryota
- Kingdom: Animalia
- Phylum: Arthropoda
- Class: Insecta
- Order: Lepidoptera
- Superfamily: Noctuoidea
- Family: Erebidae
- Genus: Autophila
- Species: A. einsleri

Binomial name
- Autophila einsleri Amsel, 1935

Synonyms
- Autophila luxuriosa Zerny, 1933; Autophila elbursica Boursin, 1940; Autophila garmsira Wiltshire, 1952; Autophila hormuza Wiltshire, 1977; Autophila nigromarginata Schwingenshuss, 1939; Autophila cyprogena Boursin, 1940; Autophila taurica Boursin, 1940; Autophila luxuriosa arnyekolta Ronkay, Varga & Hreblay, 1998

Species of moth

Autophila einsleri is a moth of the family Erebidae first described by Hans Georg Amsel in 1935. It is found in Turkey, Jordan, Cyprus, the Caucasus, Syria, Iraq, Iran, Lebanon, Israel, Turkmenistan and Oman.

The wingspan is about 37 mm. There are two generations per year. Adults are on wing from May to July and October.

== Subspecies ==
- Autophila einsleri einsleri
- Autophila einsleri luxuriosa
