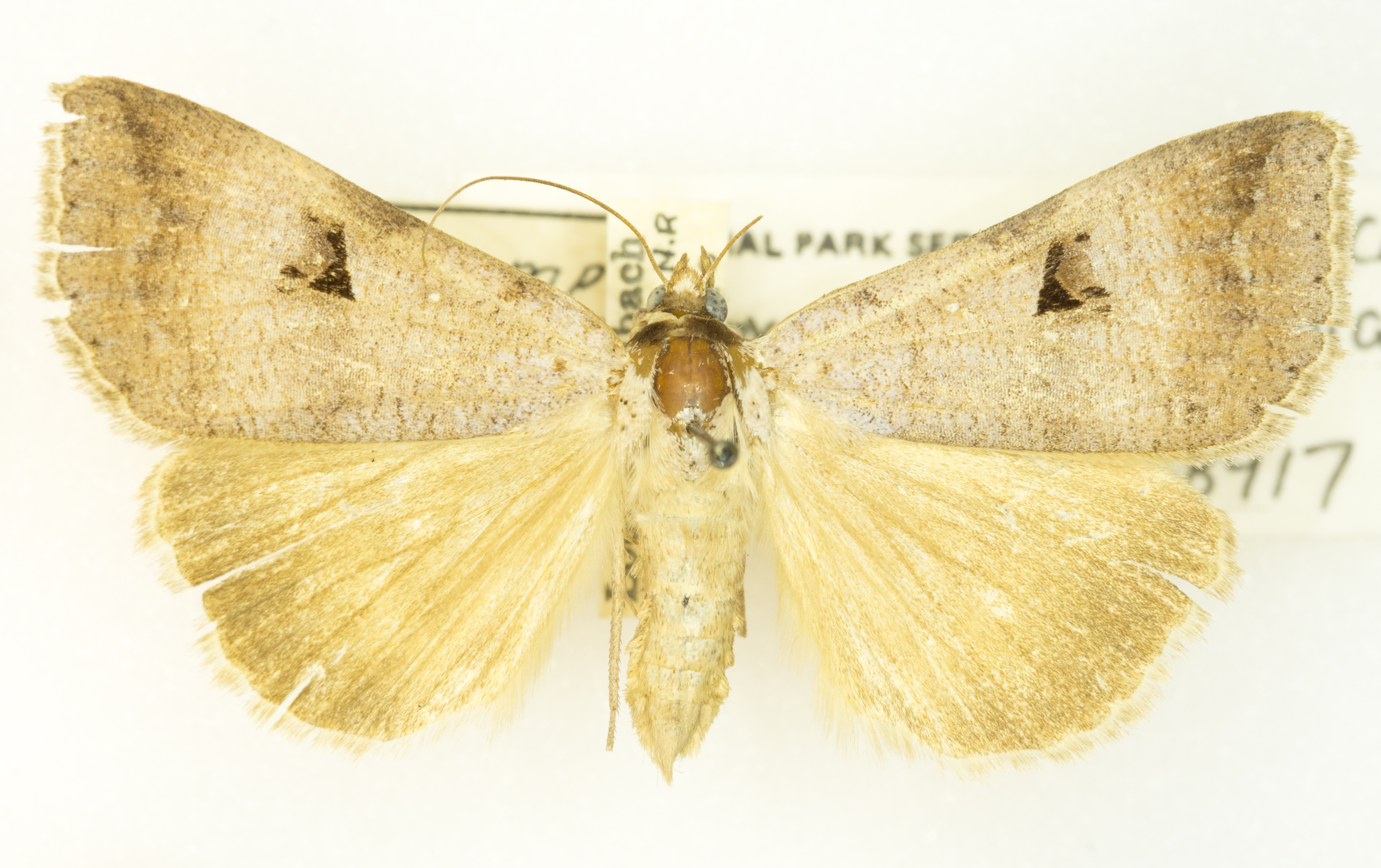

Scientific classification
- Kingdom: Animalia
- Phylum: Arthropoda
- Class: Insecta
- Order: Lepidoptera
- Superfamily: Noctuoidea
- Family: Erebidae
- Genus: Lygephila
- Species: L. victoria

Binomial name
- Lygephila victoria (Grote, 1874)

= Lygephila victoria =

Species of moth

Lygephila victoria is a species of moth in the family Erebidae. It is found in North America.
