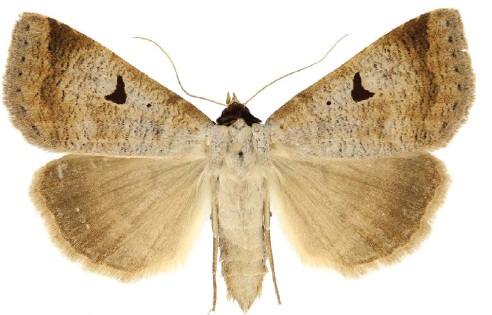
- Female Lygephila lusoria lusoria
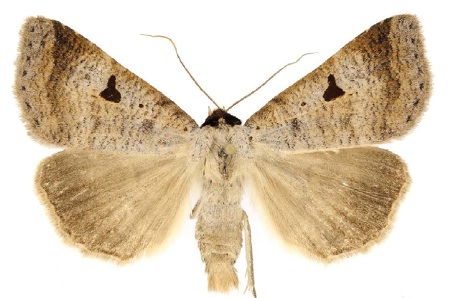
- Male Lygephila lusoria lusoria

Scientific classification
- Kingdom: Animalia
- Phylum: Arthropoda
- Class: Insecta
- Order: Lepidoptera
- Superfamily: Noctuoidea
- Family: Erebidae
- Genus: Lygephila
- Species: L. lusoria

Binomial name
- Lygephila lusoria (Linnaeus, 1758)

Synonyms
- Phalaena lusoria Linnaeus 1758; Ophiusa orobi Duponchel, 1842; Ophiusa sublutea Warren, 1913

= Lygephila lusoria =

Species of moth

Lygephila lusoria is a moth of the family Erebidae. The species was first described by Carl Linnaeus in his 1758 10th edition of Systema Naturae. It is found in southern Europe, the Near East and Middle East, European south-eastern Russia, the Caucasus, Turkey and Israel.

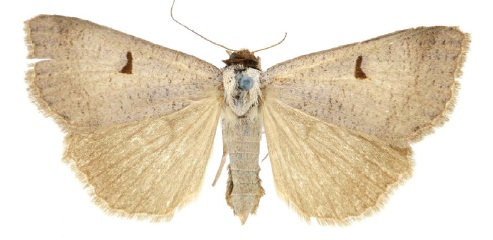
Female Lygephila lusoria glycyrrhizae

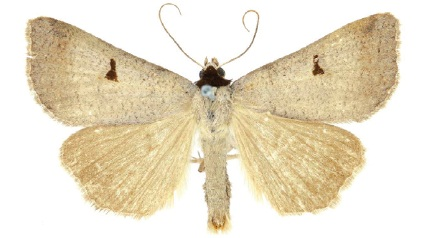
Male Lygephila lusoria glycyrrhizae

There are two generations per year depending on the location. Adults are on wing from May to September.

The larvae feed on Vicia and Astragalus species.

== Subspecies ==
- Lygephila lusoria lusoria
- Lygephila lusoria glycyrrhizae (Rambur, 1866) (Spain)

Lygephila amasina and Lygephila subpicata were previously treated as subspecies of Lygephila lusoria.
