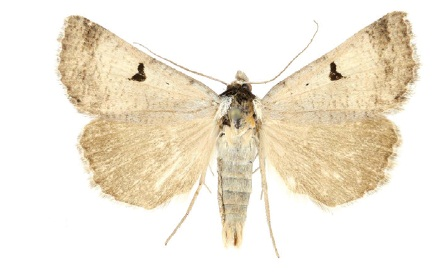

Scientific classification
- Domain: Eukaryota
- Kingdom: Animalia
- Phylum: Arthropoda
- Class: Insecta
- Order: Lepidoptera
- Superfamily: Noctuoidea
- Family: Erebidae
- Genus: Lygephila
- Species: L. minima

Binomial name
- Lygephila minima Pekarsky, 2013

= Lygephila minima =

Species of moth

Lygephila minima is a moth of the family Erebidae first described by Oleg Pekarsky in 2013. It is found in southern Russia (the Stavropol region) and Armenia.

The wingspan is about 33 mm. The forewings are beige with silver shining, irrorated (sprinkled) with a few blackish-brown scales. The hindwings are beige brown.

== Etymology ==
The species name refers to the small size of the species in contrast to the largest representative of the genus, Lygephila maxima.
