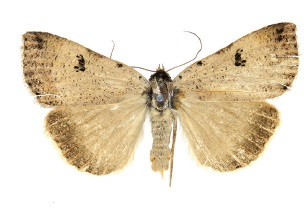

Scientific classification
- Domain: Eukaryota
- Kingdom: Animalia
- Phylum: Arthropoda
- Class: Insecta
- Order: Lepidoptera
- Superfamily: Noctuoidea
- Family: Erebidae
- Genus: Lygephila
- Species: L. lupina

Binomial name
- Lygephila lupina (Graeser, 1890)

Synonyms
- Toxocampa lupina Graeser, 1890; Eccrita mirabilis Bryk, 1948; Lygephila mirabilis

= Lygephila lupina =

Species of moth

Lygephila lupina is a moth of the family Erebidae first described by Ludwig Carl Friedrich Graeser in 1890. It is found in the Russian Far East, China and Korea.

The wingspan is 44–49 mm. The forewings are brownish grey with sparse dark brown irroration (speckles). The hindwings are brownish.
