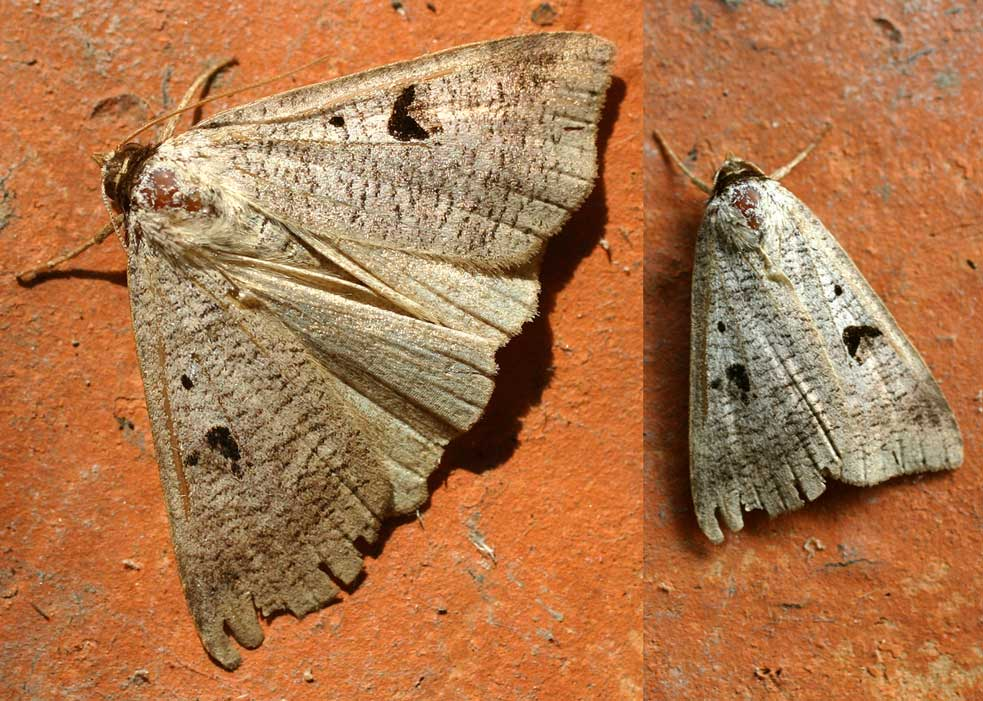
- Blackneck (Lygephila pastinum)

Scientific classification
- Domain: Eukaryota
- Kingdom: Animalia
- Phylum: Arthropoda
- Class: Insecta
- Order: Lepidoptera
- Superfamily: Noctuoidea
- Family: Erebidae
- Subfamily: Toxocampinae
- Genus: Lygephila; Billberg, 1820

Synonyms
- Asticta Hübner, [1823]; Toxocampa Guenée, 1841; Eccrita Lederer, 1857; Craccaphila Berio, 1996; Sinocampa Kononenko & Fibiger, 2008; Katyusha Kemal & Koçak, 2009

= Lygephila =

Genus of moths

Lygephila is a genus of moths in the family Erebidae. The genus was erected by Gustaf Johan Billberg in 1820.

== Species ==
- Lygephila alaica Remm, 1983
- Lygephila alikanga Strand, 1920
- Lygephila amasina (Staudinger, 1878)
- Lygephila angustipennis Warren, 1913
- Lygephila angustissima Draudt, 1950
- Lygephila bischofi Hacker & Fibiger, 2006
- Lygephila caeca Staudinger, 1896
- Lygephila camerounica Hayes, 1980
- Lygephila colorata Babics & Ronkay, 2009
- Lygephila craccae (Denis & Schiffermüller, 1775) – scarce blackneck
- Lygephila dorsigera Walker, 1865
- Lygephila dubatolovi Fibiger, Kononenko & Nilsson, 2008
- Lygephila exsiccata Lederer, 1855
- Lygephila fereidun Wiltshire, 1961
- Lygephila fonti Yela & Calle, 1990
- Lygephila glycyrrhizae Staudinger, 1871
- Lygephila homogyna Hampson, 1902
- Lygephila kazachkaratavika Stshetkin YuL & Stshetkin YuYu, 1994
- Lygephila kishidai Kinoshita, 1989
- Lygephila leucobasis Bethune-Baker, 1911
- Lygephila longicoecum Kononenko & Fibiger, 2008
- Lygephila lubrica Freyer, 1846
- Lygephila lubrosa (Staudinger, 1901)
  - Lygephila lubrosa orbonaria Stshetkin YuL & Stshetkin YuYu, 1994 [1997]
- Lygephila ludrica Hübner, 1790
- Lygephila lupina Graeser, 1890
- Lygephila lusoria Linnaeus, 1758
- Lygephila maxima Bremer, 1861
- Lygephila minima Pekarsky, 2013
- Lygephila moellendorfi Herz, 1904
- Lygephila nigra Viette, 1954
- Lygephila nigricostata Graeser, 1890
- Lygephila ogatai Kinoshita & Sasaki, 1989
- Lygephila pallida Bang-Haas, 1907
- Lygephila pastinum Treitschke, 1826 – blackneck
- Lygephila plumbea Distant, 1898
- Lygephila procax Hübner, 1813
- Lygephila recta Bremer, 1864
- Lygephila salax (Guenée, 1852)
- Lygephila schachti Behounek & Hacker, 1986
- Lygephila stueningi Kononenko & Fibiger, 2008
- Lygephila subpicata Wiltshire, 1971
- Lygephila subrecta Sugi, 1982
- Lygephila troberti Guenée, 1852
- Lygephila viciae Hübner, [1822]
- Lygephila vicioides Hampson, 1926
- Lygephila victoria Grote, 1874
- Lygephila violaceogrisea Draudt, 1950
- Lygephila vulcanea Butler, 1881
- Lygephila yoshimotoi Kinoshita, 1989

== Former species ==
- Lygephila mirabilis Bryk, 1948
