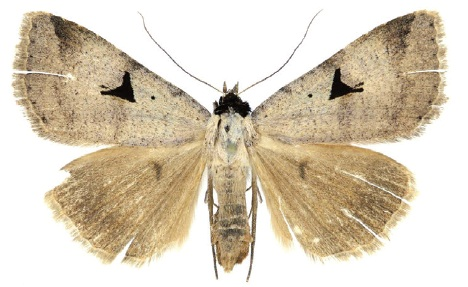
- Female
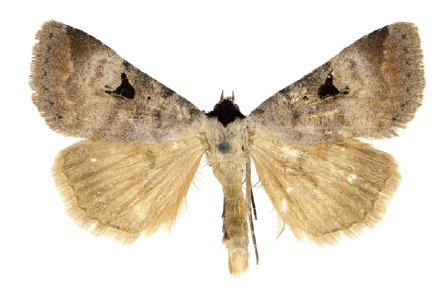
- Male

Scientific classification
- Domain: Eukaryota
- Kingdom: Animalia
- Phylum: Arthropoda
- Class: Insecta
- Order: Lepidoptera
- Superfamily: Noctuoidea
- Family: Erebidae
- Genus: Lygephila
- Species: L. amasina

Binomial name
- Lygephila amasina (Staudinger, 1878)

Synonyms
- Toxocampa amasina Staudinger 1878; Lygephila lusoria (Linnaeus 1758)

= Lygephila amasina =

Species of moth

Lygephila amasina is a moth of the family Erebidae first described by Otto Staudinger in 1878. It is found in Turkey, Lebanon and Israel.

Adults can be distinguished from similar Lygephila lusoria lusoria by the more contrasting wing pattern and the somewhat longer inner corner of the reniform stigmata.
