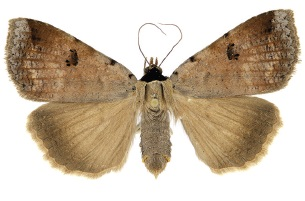
- Female

Scientific classification
- Domain: Eukaryota
- Kingdom: Animalia
- Phylum: Arthropoda
- Class: Insecta
- Order: Lepidoptera
- Superfamily: Noctuoidea
- Family: Erebidae
- Genus: Lygephila
- Species: L. vulcanea

Binomial name
- Lygephila vulcanea (Butler, 1881)

Synonyms
- Toxocampa vulcanea Butler, 1881

= Lygephila vulcanea =

Species of moth

Lygephila vulcanea is a moth of the family Erebidae first described by Arthur Gardiner Butler in 1881. It is found in Russia and Japan.
