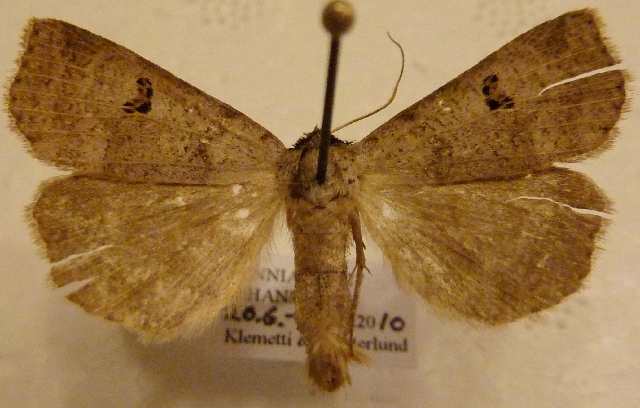

Scientific classification
- Domain: Eukaryota
- Kingdom: Animalia
- Phylum: Arthropoda
- Class: Insecta
- Order: Lepidoptera
- Superfamily: Noctuoidea
- Family: Erebidae
- Genus: Lygephila
- Species: L. viciae

Binomial name
- Lygephila viciae (Hübner, 1822)

Synonyms
- Noctua viciae Hübner, 1822; Ophiusa viciae coronillae Herrich-Schäffer, 1855; Toxocampa stigmata Wileman, 1911

= Lygephila viciae =

Species of moth

Lygephila viciae is a moth of the family Erebidae. It is found in most of Europe.

The wingspan is 35–36 mm. There are two generations per year depending on the location. Adults are on wing from May to September.

The larvae feed on Astragalus, Coronilla, Lathyrus, Polygonum and Melilotus species.
