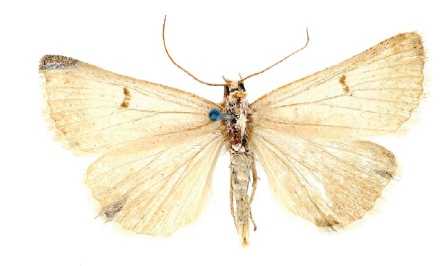
- Male

Scientific classification
- Kingdom: Animalia
- Phylum: Arthropoda
- Class: Insecta
- Order: Lepidoptera
- Superfamily: Noctuoidea
- Family: Erebidae
- Genus: Lygephila
- Species: L. pallida

Binomial name
- Lygephila pallida (A. Bang-Haas, 1907)

Synonyms
- Toxocampa pallida Bang-Haas, 1907

= Lygephila pallida =

Species of moth

Lygephila pallida is a moth of the family Erebidae first described by Andreas Bang-Haas in 1907. It is found in central and eastern Turkey.
