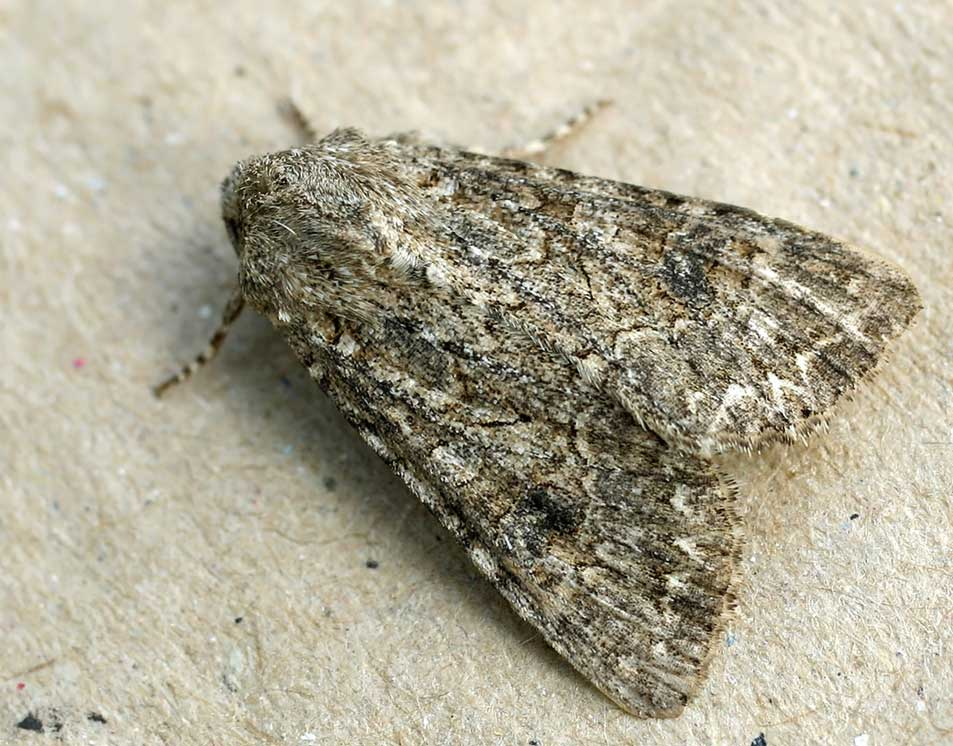
- Hadula trifolii

Scientific classification
- Domain: Eukaryota
- Kingdom: Animalia
- Phylum: Arthropoda
- Class: Insecta
- Order: Lepidoptera
- Superfamily: Noctuoidea
- Family: Noctuidae
- Tribe: Hadenini
- Subtribe: Discestrina
- Genus: Hadula; Staudinger, 1889

= Hadula =

Genus of moths

Hadula is a genus of moths of the family Noctuidae.

== Species ==
- Hadula agrotiformis (Hampson, 1896)
- Hadula anthracina (Hacker, 1996)
- Hadula arenaria (Hampson, 1905)
- Hadula armata (Staudinger, 1888)
- Hadula atlantis (Schwingenschuss, 1955)
- Hadula baksana Schintlmeister & Poltawski, 1986
- Hadula basilewskyi (Berio, 1972)
- Hadula bergeri (Berio, 1972)
- Hadula brassicina (Draudt, 1934)
- Hadula chiklika (Moore, 1878)
- Hadula chimaera (Rothschild, 1920)
- Hadula colletti (Sparre-Schneider, 1876)
- Hadula crotchi (Grote, 1880)
- Hadula deserticola (Hampson, 1905)
- Hadula dianthi (Tauscher, 1809)
- Hadula engedina Hacker, 1998
- Hadula eremistis (Püngeler, 1904)
- Hadula eversmanni (Staudinger, 1900)
- Hadula explicata (Sukhareva, 1976)
- Hadula furca (Eversmann, 1852)
- Hadula furcula (Staudinger, 1889)
- Hadula gandhara Hacker, 1998
- Hadula gigantea (Rebel, 1909)
- Hadula gobideserti (Varga, 1973)
- Hadula gredosi (Laever, 1977)
- Hadula halodeserti Varga, 1973
- Hadula halolimna (Gyulai & Varga, 1998)
- Hadula hampsoni Hacker, 1998
- Hadula hoplites (Staudinger, 1901)
- Hadula hreblayi Hacker, 1998
- Hadula imperspicua Hacker, 1998
- Hadula inexpecta (Yoshimoto, 1995)
- Hadula insolita Staudinger, 1889
- Hadula insperata Gyulai & Hacker, 1998
- Hadula isoloma (Püngeler, 1904)
- Hadula latemarginata (Wiltshire, 1976)
- Hadula melanopa – Broad-Bordered White Underwing (Thunberg, 1791)
- Hadula mendax (Staudinger, 1879)
- Hadula mendica (Staudinger, 1895)
- Hadula militzae (Kozhantschikov, 1947)
- Hadula nekrasovi Gyulai & Varga, 1998
- Hadula nigrolunata (Packard, 1867) (mostly placed in the genus Anarta)
- Hadula nupponenorum Hacker & Fibiger, 2002
- Hadula ochrea (Warren, 1909)
- Hadula odontites (Boisduval, 1829)
- Hadula orbona Bang-Haas, 1912
- Hadula osmana Hacker, 1998
- Hadula parvula Hacker, 1998
- Hadula perdentata (Hampson, 1894)
- Hadula ptochica (Püngeler, 1900)
- Hadula pugnax (Hübner, [1824])
- Hadula quercii (Berio, 1941)
- Hadula sabulorum (Alphéraky, 1882)
- Hadula schawyra (Bang-Haas, 1927)
- Hadula schneideri (Staudinger, 1900)
- Hadula sodae (Boisduval, 1829)
- Hadula stigmosa (Christoph, 1887)
- Hadula trifolii – The Nutmeg (Hufnagel, 1766)
- Hadula triphaenopsis (Oberthür, 1893)
- Hadula ultramontana Gyulai & Hacker, 1998
- Hadula vaciva (Püngeler, 1906)
- Hadula vargai (Hreblay & Ronkay, 1998)
- Hadula vassilinini (O. Bang-Haas, 1927)

== Former species ==
- Hadula alta is now Anarta alta (Barnes & Benjamin, 1942)
- Hadula castrae is now Anarta castrae (Barnes & McDunnough, 1912)
- Hadula chartaria is now Anarta chartaria (Grote, 1873)
- Hadula chunka (Smith, 1910) is now a synonym of Anarta crotchii (Grote, 1880)
- Hadula farnhami is now Anarta farnhami (Grote, 1873)
- Hadula fulgora is now Anarta fulgora (Barnes & McDunnough, 1918)
- Hadula hamata is now Anarta hamata (McDunnough, 1930)
- Hadula mutata is now Anarta mutata (Dod, 1913)
- Hadula oaklandiae is now Anarta oaklandiae (McDunnough, 1937)
- Hadula obesula is now Anarta obesula (Smith, 1904)
- Hadula oregonica is now Anarta oregonica (Grote, 1881)
- Hadula projecta is now Anarta projecta (McDunnough, 1938)
- Hadula subalbida is now Anarta subalbida (Barnes & Benjamin, 1924)
