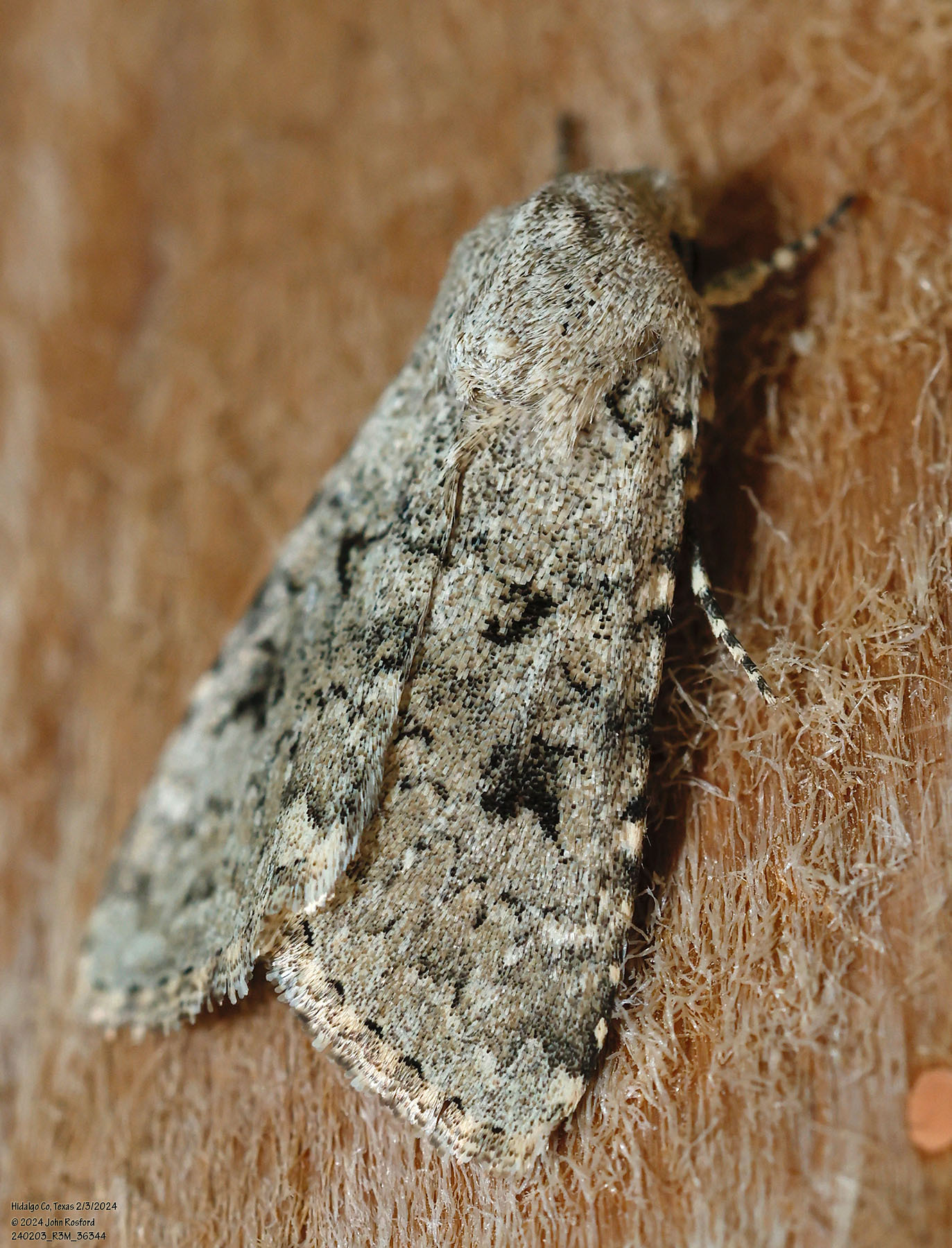

Scientific classification
- Kingdom: Animalia
- Phylum: Arthropoda
- Clade: Pancrustacea
- Class: Insecta
- Order: Lepidoptera
- Superfamily: Noctuoidea
- Family: Noctuidae
- Subtribe: Discestrina
- Genus: Anarta
- Species: A. florida

Binomial name
- Anarta florida (Smith, 1900)

Synonyms
- Mamestra florida Smith, 1900; Discestra florida (Smith, 1900)

= Anarta florida =

Species of moth

Anarta florida is a species of cutworm or dart moth in the family Noctuidae. It was originally described by John Bernhard Smith in 1900 and named Mamestra florida.
