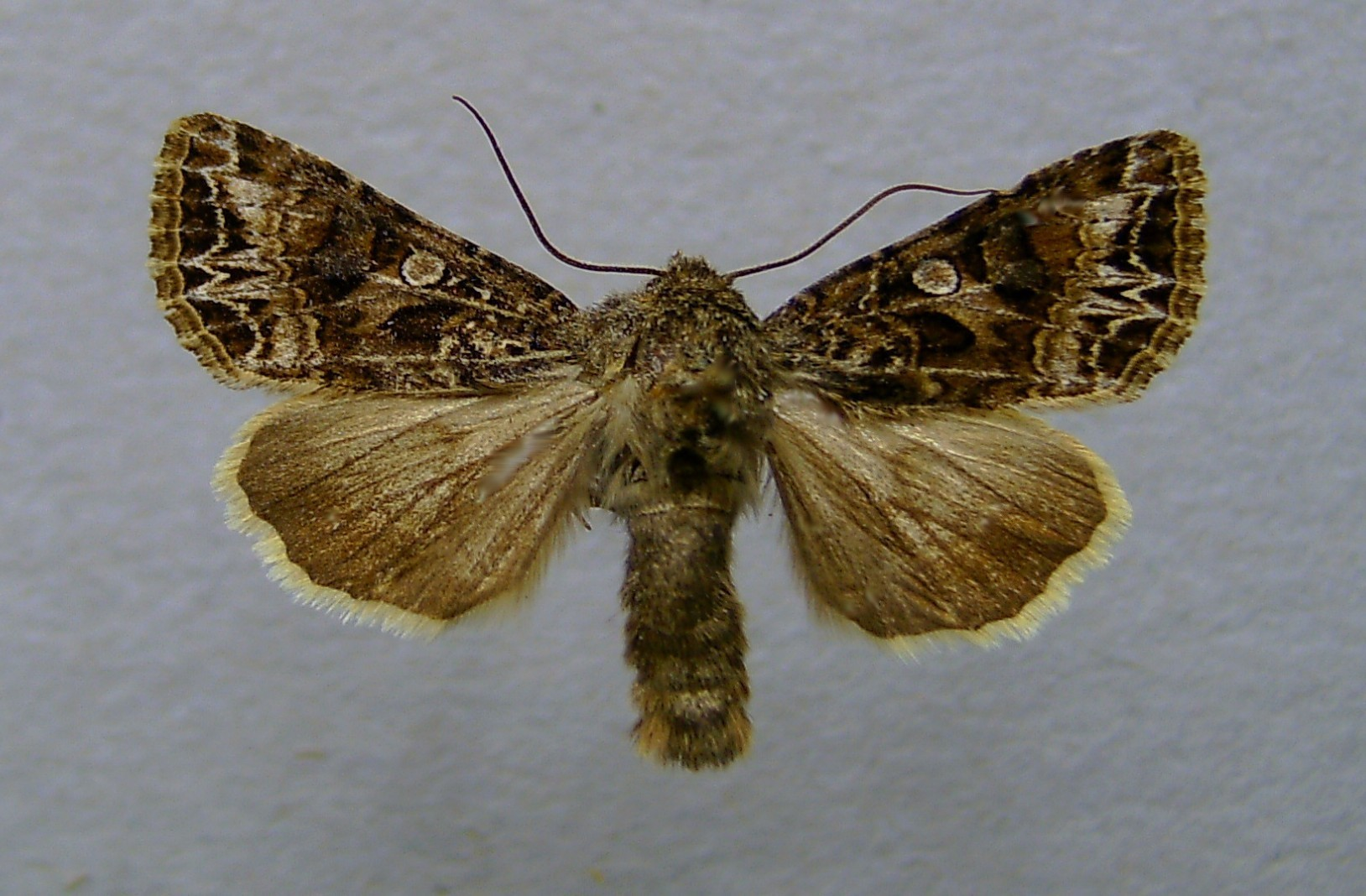

Scientific classification
- Domain: Eukaryota
- Kingdom: Animalia
- Phylum: Arthropoda
- Class: Insecta
- Order: Lepidoptera
- Superfamily: Noctuoidea
- Family: Noctuidae
- Genus: Hadula
- Species: H. odontites

Binomial name
- Hadula odontites (Boisduval, 1829)

Synonyms
- Hadena odontites Boisduval, 1829; Hadula nana Hufnagel, 1766; Hadula microdon Guenée, 1852; Mamestra maromorsa var. dalmatina Schwingenschuss, 1926; Discestra microdon

= Hadula odontites =

Species of moth

Hadula odontites is a moth of the family Noctuidae. It is found from the Iberian Peninsula through central and southern Europa, east up to Ukraine. In the south it is found in the Mediterranean Sea area and Asia Minor, northern Iran, southern Russia, up to Mongolia.

The wingspan is 30–36 mm. Adults are on wing from April to June and from July to September in two generations. On higher altitudes there is only one generation.

The larvae feed on the leaves of Hippocrepis comosa. Adults feed on the nectar of Thymus, Origanum vulgare and Lotus corniculatus.

== Subspecies ==
- Hadula odontites odontites
- Hadula odontites boisduvali
- Hadula odontites turkestana
