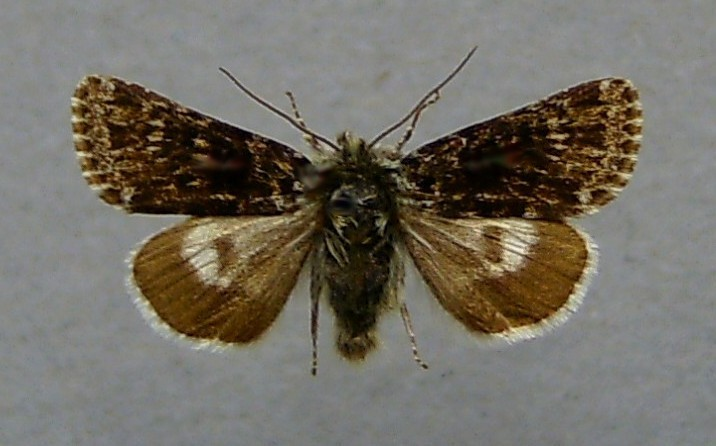

Scientific classification
- Domain: Eukaryota
- Kingdom: Animalia
- Phylum: Arthropoda
- Class: Insecta
- Order: Lepidoptera
- Superfamily: Noctuoidea
- Family: Noctuidae
- Genus: Hadula
- Species: H. melanopa

Binomial name
- Hadula melanopa (Thunberg, 1791)

Synonyms
- Anarta melanopa; Noctua melanopa Thunberg, 1791; Noctua alpicola Quenzel, 1802; Anarta wistroemi Lampa, 1885; Pyralis rupestralis Hübner, 1799; Noctua vidua Hübner, 1808; Noctua tristis Hübner, 1809; Noctua rupestris Hübner, 1819; Anarta koizumidakeana Matsumura, 1927

= Hadula melanopa =

Broad-bordered white underwing

Species of moth

Hadula melanopa, the broad-bordered white underwing, is a moth of the family Noctuidae. The species was first described by Carl Peter Thunberg in 1791. Subspecies H. m. melanopa is found in northern Scandinavia; subspecies H. m. rupestralis is found in the Alps, the Balkan Mountains and the Apennine Mountains; subspecies H. m. brunnea is found in mountainous areas of Great Britain and subspecies H. m. koizumidakeana is found in Japan.

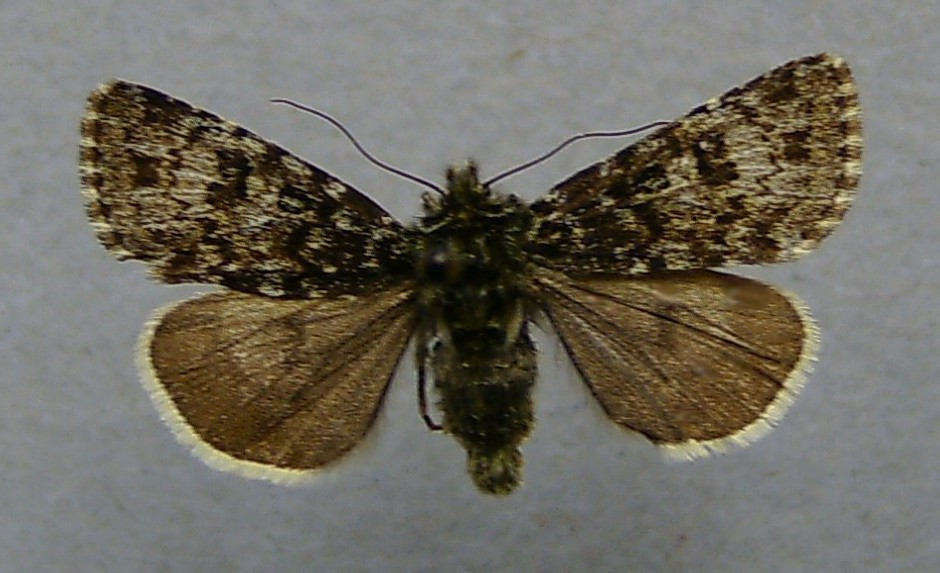
Alpine form, H. m. rupestralis

== Description ==
The wingspan of subspecies H. m. melanopa is 20–26 mm and subspecies H. m. brunnea has a wingspan of 25–29 mm. Forewing pale or dark grey with blacker markings, when fresh with a bluish grey powdering; the 3 stigmata black or black edged; outer line alone well-defined, lunulate-dentate; submarginal line preceded by blackish marks, which on costa and beyond cell coalesce and form blotches; fringe mottled black and white; hindwing white, with broad black terminal border; a large black cellspot; base and inner margin smoky fuscous; ab. wistroemi Lampa from Sweden and the Shetland islands, has the forewings darker, more mixed with brownish or yellow, the underside with a broad black border like that of hindwing; — in rupestralis Hbn. (= tristis Hbn., rupestris Hbn.) the white of the hindwing is obscured by dark smoky fuscous; this form is restricted to the Alps and the mountains of central Italy; vidua Hbn. is intermediate, the hindwing having a greyish white patch only beyond the reniform. It may be noted that in typical melanopa the underside of both wings is white, but becomes clouded and darkened in proportion to the darkening of the upperside.— Larva rosy purple; dorsal line ochreous edged with dark, and marked with red spots; subdorsal line yellowish, black edged, with row of black marks above and below it; the spiracular line pale yellow marked with red.

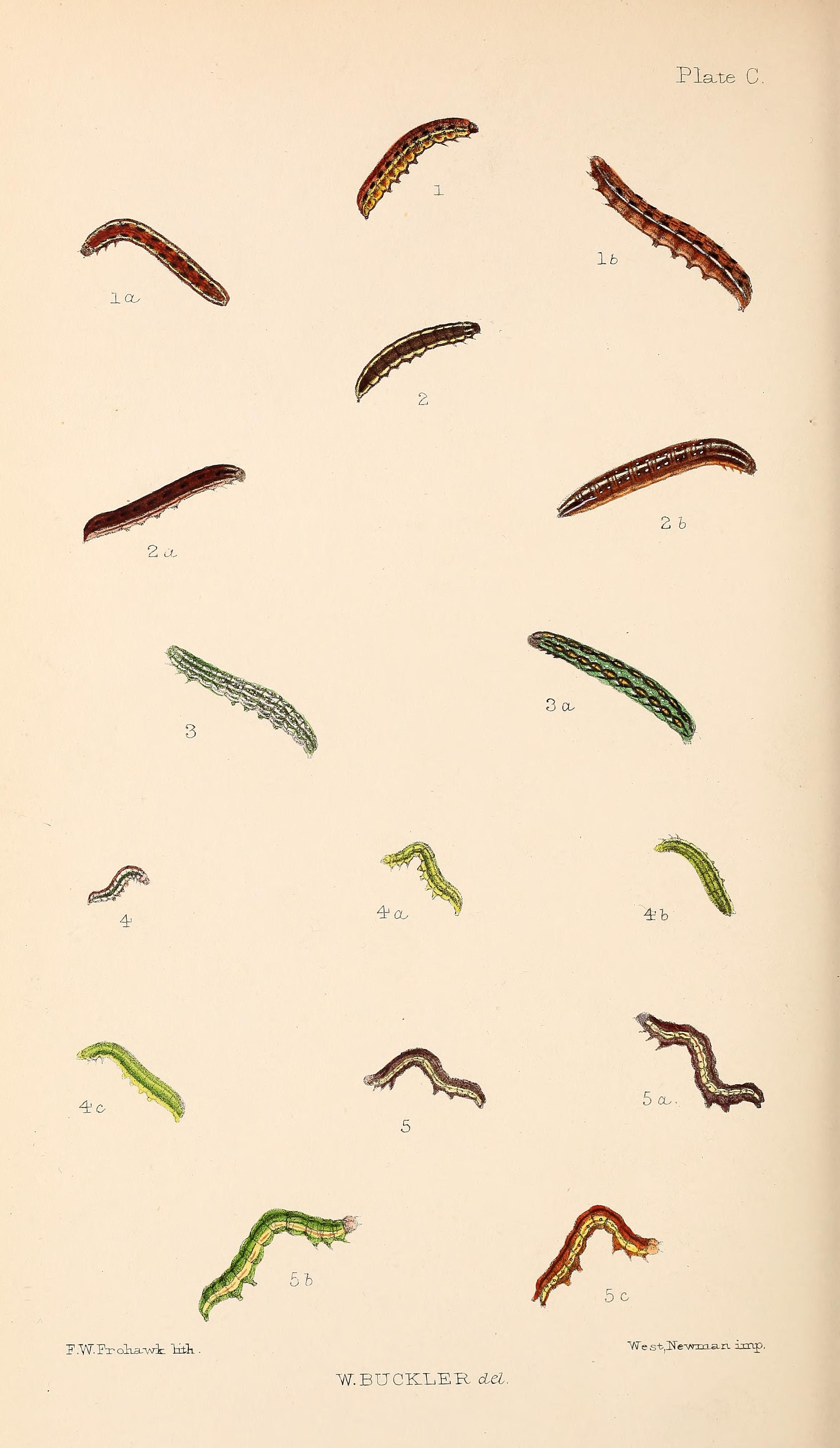
1, 1a, 1b larvae in various stages of growth

== Biology ==
Adults are on wing from June to August in one generation.

The larvae feed on various plants, including Empetrum, Vaccinium, Dryas octopetala and low growing Salix species.

== Subspecies ==
- Hadula melanopa melanopa (Scandinavia)
- Hadula melanopa rupestralis (Alps, Balkan and Apennine Mountains)
- Hadula melanopa brunnea (Great Britain)
- Hadula melanopa koizumidakeana (Japan)
