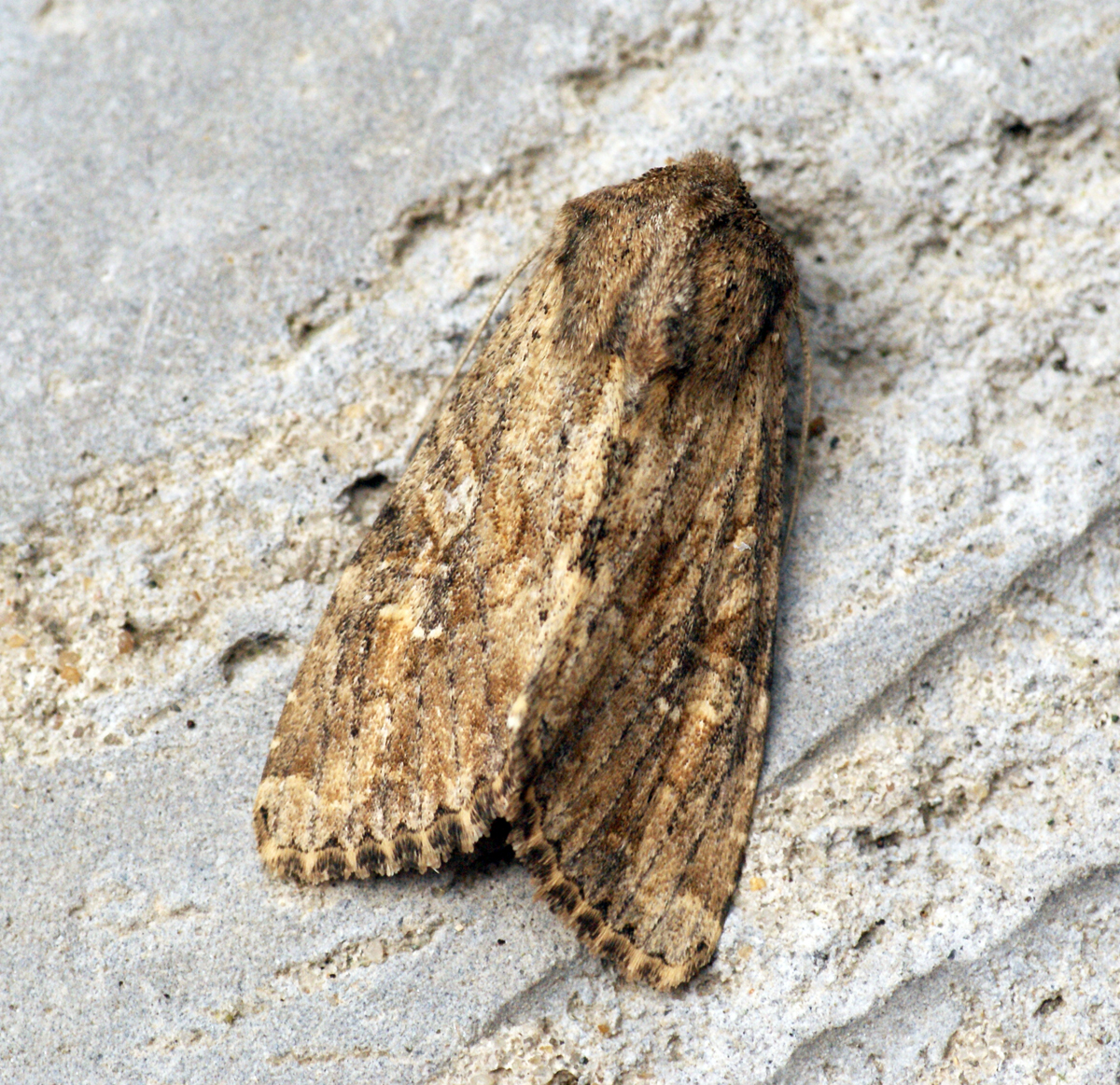

Scientific classification
- Kingdom: Animalia
- Phylum: Arthropoda
- Clade: Pancrustacea
- Class: Insecta
- Order: Lepidoptera
- Superfamily: Noctuoidea
- Family: Noctuidae
- Genus: Hadula
- Species: H. trifolii

Binomial name
- Hadula trifolii (Hufnagel, 1766)

Synonyms
- Discestra trifolii; Anarta trifolii

= Nutmeg (moth) =

Nutmeg moth

Species of moth

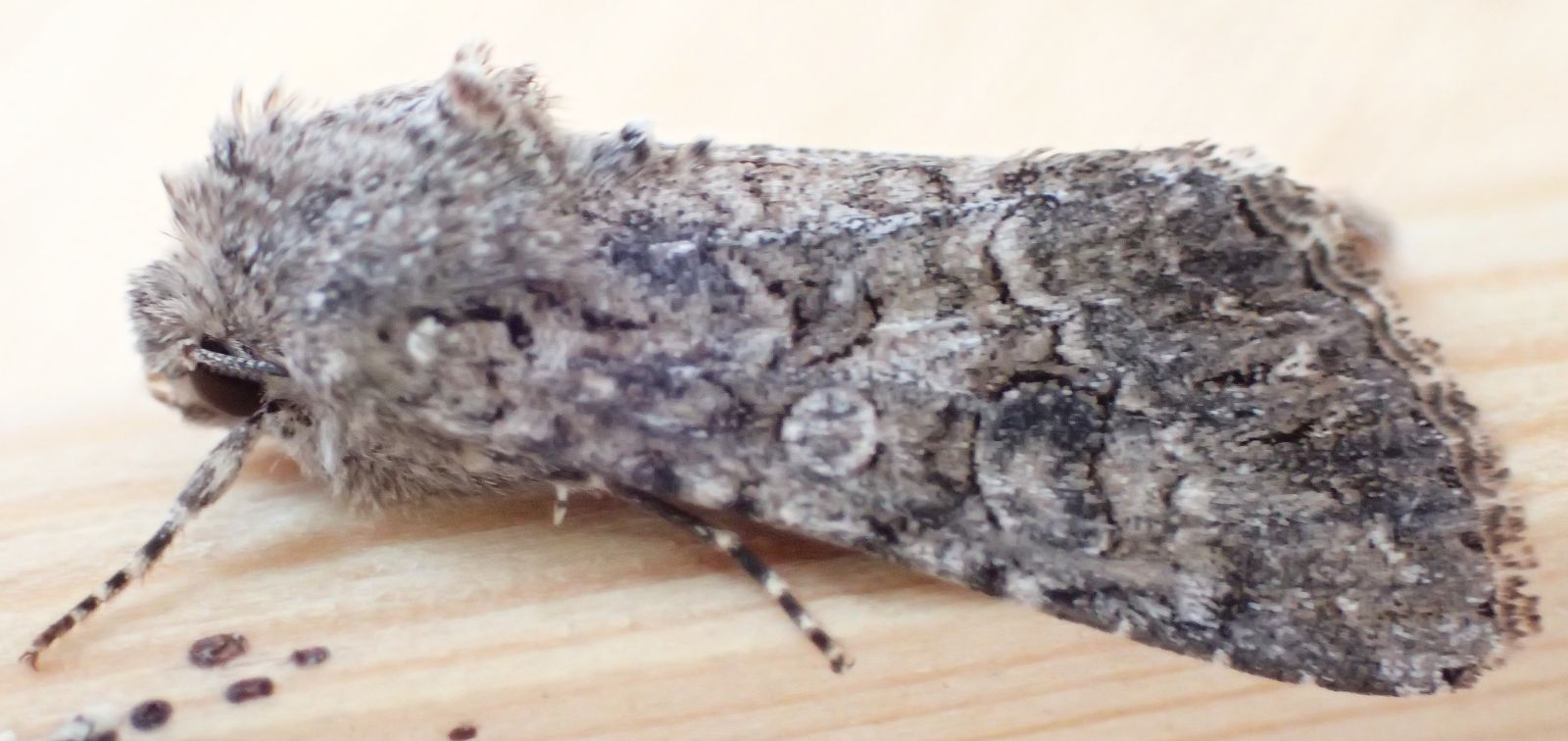

The nutmeg (Hadula trifolii or Anarta trifolii), also known as the clover cutworm, is a moth of the family Noctuidae.

== Distribution ==
It is found in the Western Palearctic (western Europe, Tunisia, Iran), Niger, and Quebec in North America. In the north of its European range it is a summer migrant, not being able to survive the cold winters.

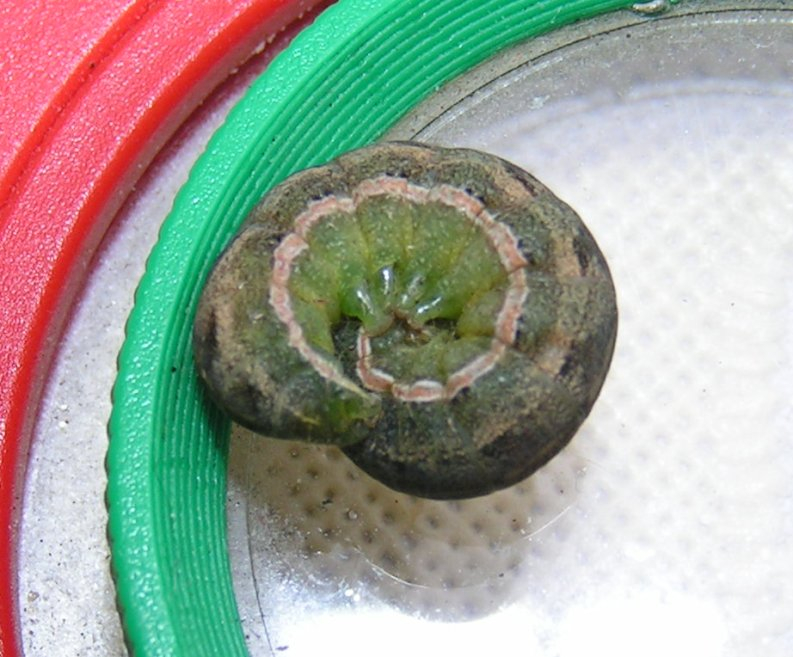
Larva

== Description ==
This is a small to medium (wingspan 33–39 mm) species with cryptically coloured forewings, varying from light to dark brown, sometimes with a reddish tinge. The most characteristic feature is a distinctively W-shaped, white subterminal line. This feature is seen on some other noctuids, but usually much larger species. The hindwings are grey or buff, darker towards the termen, and marked with dark veins.

== Description in Seitz ==
Forewing grey, dark speckled:costa black-spotted: claviform stigma small: orbicular round, pale, sometimes whitish: reniform large, the lower lobe dark grey, all three finely black-edged; veins towards termen finely black; hindwing dull whitish, with abroad border and the veins fuscous. — saucia Esp. is the form showing a tendency to an ochreous tint; - in ab. farkasii Tr. the forewing is more variegated, light and dark, the larger pale orbicular stigma and a pale patch obliquely below it forming a prominent streak; — indistincta Tutt has a uniform dull appearance, without speckling; — albifusa Walk. [now subspecies A. t. albifusa (Walker, 1857) Nova Scotia], described originally from a N. American specimen, but probably a rare general aberration, has occurred at Portland, on the chalky South coast of England: it is grey with a yellowish gloss, with a pale band as in farkasii, joined by a second pale oblique band from apex. - Larva varying from green to brown, thickly dark-dotted; dorsal line fine, pale, subdorsal lines broader, all black-edged; spiracular stripe broad, yellow varied with reddish.

== Biology ==
One or two broods are produced each year, and adults can be seen at any time from May to September. This species flies at night and is attracted to light as well as to sugar and nectar-rich flowers.

Flight from June to first half of July. Second generation from latter half of July to September.

The larvae feed on a wide range of plants (see list below). The species overwinters as pupae.

== Recorded food plants ==
- Allium
- Amaranthus – amaranth
- Apium – celery
- Arachis – peanut
- Asparagus – asparagus
- Atriplex
- Beta – beet
- Brassica
- Cannabis
- Chenopodium – goosefoot
- Cytisus – broom
- Glycine – soybean
- Gossypium – cotton plant
- Halogeton
- Hibiscus
- Lactuca – lettuce
- Linum – flax
- Lycopersicon – tomato
- Medicago – alfalfa
- Nicotiana – tobacco
- Petroselinum – parsley
- Phaseolus – common bean
- Pisum
- Populus – poplar
- Portulaca – purslane
- Raphanus – radish
- Rheum – rhubarb
- Ricinus – castor bean
- Salsola
- Scorzonera
- Sonchus – sow-thistle
- Spinacia – spinach
- Taraxacum – dandelion
- Trifolium – clover
- Ulmus – elm

See reference.
