= Anarta antica =

Scientific classification
- Domain: Eukaryota
- Kingdom: Animalia
- Phylum: Arthropoda
- Class: Insecta
- Order: Lepidoptera
- Superfamily: Noctuoidea
- Family: Noctuidae
- Subtribe: Discestrina
- Genus: Anarta
- Species: A. antica

Binomial name
- Anarta antica (Smith, 1891)

Species of moth

Anarta antica is a species of cutworm or dart moth in the family Noctuidae.

The MONA or Hodges number for Anarta antica is 10258.
