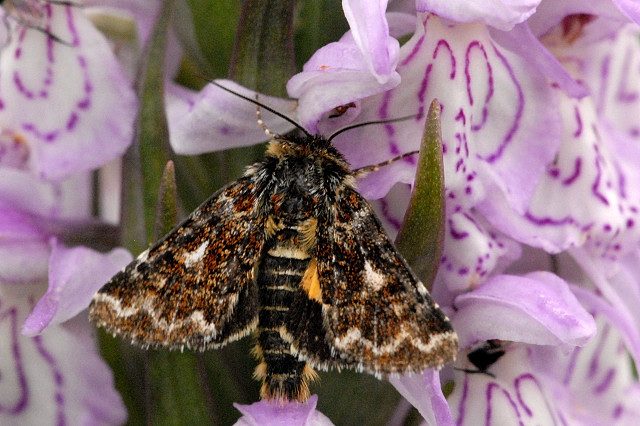

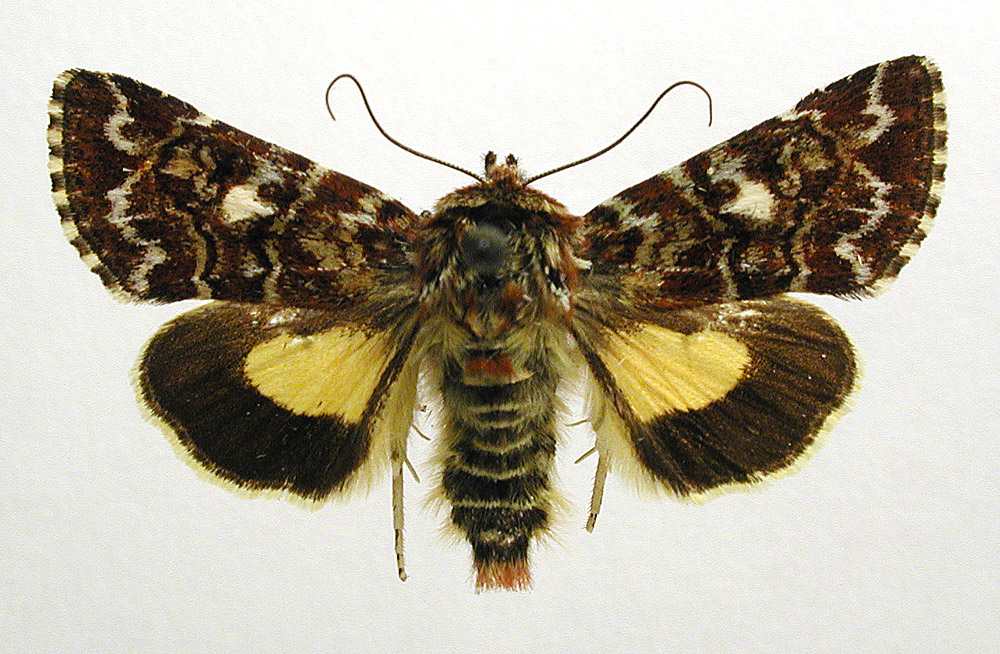

Scientific classification
- Kingdom: Animalia
- Phylum: Arthropoda
- Class: Insecta
- Order: Lepidoptera
- Superfamily: Noctuoidea
- Family: Noctuidae
- Genus: Anarta
- Species: A. myrtilli

Binomial name
- Anarta myrtilli (Linnaeus, 1761)

Synonyms
- Phalaena myrtilli; Phalaena ericae; Anarta rufescens

= Anarta myrtilli =

Species of moth

Anarta myrtilli, the beautiful yellow underwing, is a moth in the family Noctuidae. The species was first described by Carl Linnaeus in 1761. It is found in most of Europe including Scandinavia, Britain, France, Germany, Switzerland, Spain, Portugal, Italy, and Russia.

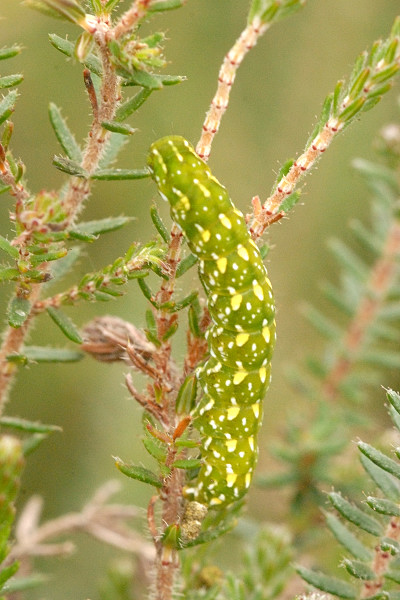
Caterpillar

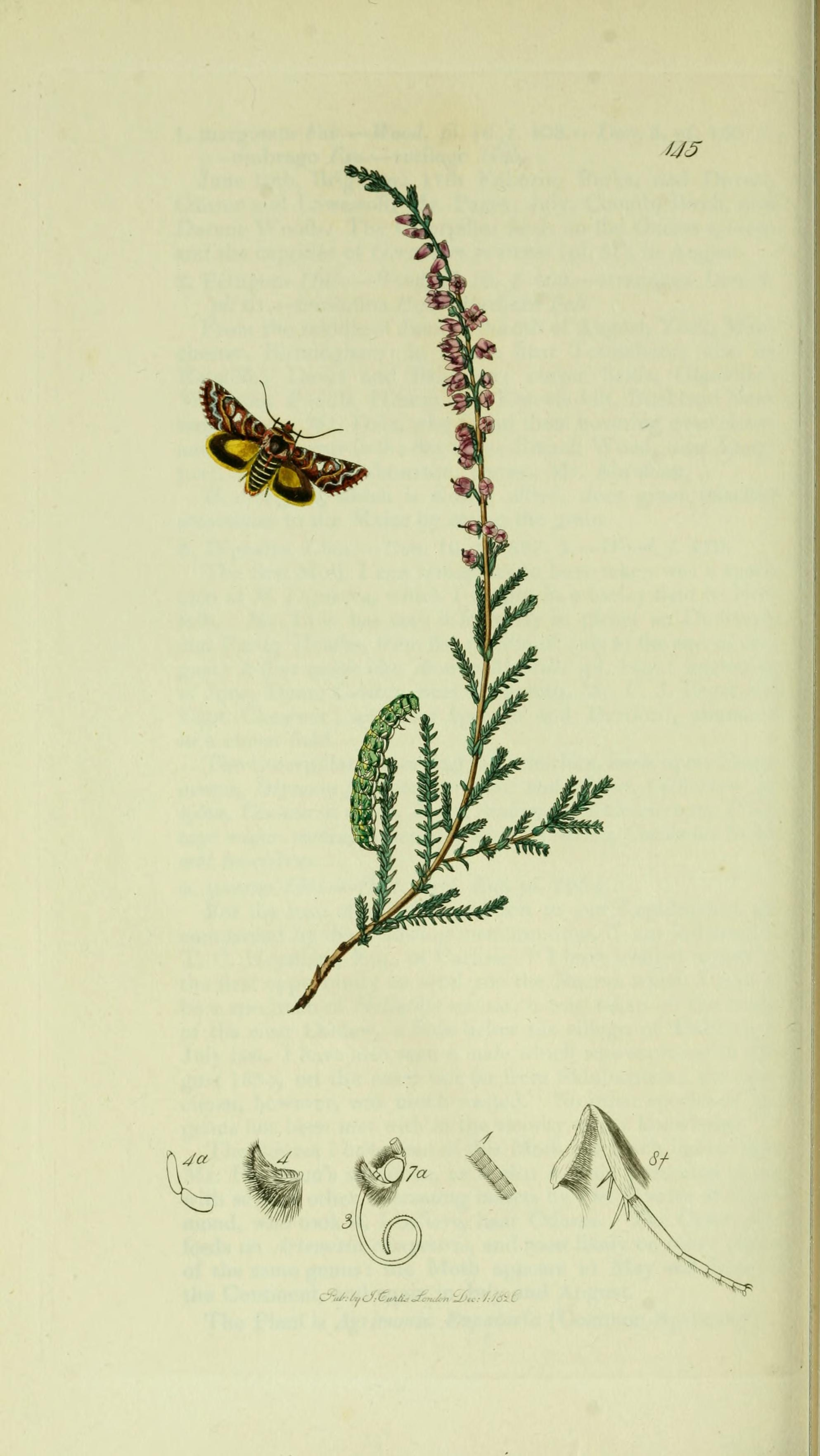
Illustration from John Curtis's British Entomology Volume 5

The wingspan is 20–22 mm. Forewing dull dark fuscous purple, with the lines slightly paler; the stigmata obscure; a subtriangular whitish blotch on base of vein 2; hindwing orange with broad black terminal border; the costa and inner margin narrowly black and the base of wing often smoky blackish; this, the type form, occurring in Sweden, the north of England and Scotland, and other northern localities is very different from the usual bright red form, which is the ab. rufescens Tutt. In this the forewing is a mixture of bright red, and olive brown or olive yellow; the transverse lines being more or less strongly whitish, the stigmata red brown with pale rings, and the white spot on vein 2 distinct; ab. peralbata ab. nov. [Warren] is an extreme form of this, in which the white lines are strongly developed, and the central area is milk white from costa to inner margin, including the white blotch on vein 2; in the hindwing the yellow is ampler, the black of the costal, and inner margins and the basal suffusion being reduced; - ab.albivena Haw., described from East Anglian specimens, has the forewing suffused with olive brown, wing remaining normal; while in alpina Ractzer not only is the forewing olive brown, but the hindwing shows only a dull yellowish median band crossed by black veins; and again in olivacea Fuchs the yellow of the hindwing is suffused with olive brown, while the coloration of the forewing remains of the normal bright red; in ab. nigrescens ab. nov. [Warren] occurring at Hyères in the south of France, the usual red fusion is almost entirely replaced by black; lastly, in subsp. citrina subsp. nov. [Warren] from Sintra, Portugal, the whole forewing is suffused with blackish, leaving only the white blotch on vein 2 conspicuous, and the orange of the hindwing, both above and below, is pale lemon yellow; as the insect is decidedly larger than average typical myrtilli, it may prove a distinct species; at present I have seen only one - taken in the spring of 1909 by Mr N. C. Rothschild, and now in the Tring Museum.

Adults are on wing between May and August depending on the location. There are probably two generations per year.

The larvae feed on Calluna vulgaris and Erica tetralix.
