= Anarta edwardsii =

Scientific classification
- Kingdom: Animalia
- Phylum: Arthropoda
- Class: Insecta
- Order: Lepidoptera
- Superfamily: Noctuoidea
- Family: Noctuidae
- Subtribe: Discestrina
- Genus: Anarta
- Species: A. edwardsii

Binomial name
- Anarta edwardsii (Smith, 1888)

Synonyms
- Trichoclea edwardsii Smith, 1888

Species of moth

Anarta edwardsii is a species of cutworm or dart moth in the family Noctuidae.

The MONA or Hodges number for Anarta edwardsii is 10255.
