= Anarta arenbergeri =

Scientific classification
- Kingdom: Animalia
- Phylum: Arthropoda
- Class: Insecta
- Order: Lepidoptera
- Superfamily: Noctuoidea
- Family: Noctuidae
- Genus: Anarta
- Species: A. arenbergeri

Binomial name
- Anarta arenbergeri (Pinker, 1974)

Species of moth

Anarta arenbergeri is a species of moth of the family Noctuidae. It has only been recorded from Turkey and Israel. It is said that this species lives in arid and semi-arid regions in the Central Negev.

Adults are on wing from May to July and again in September. There are probably two generations per year.
