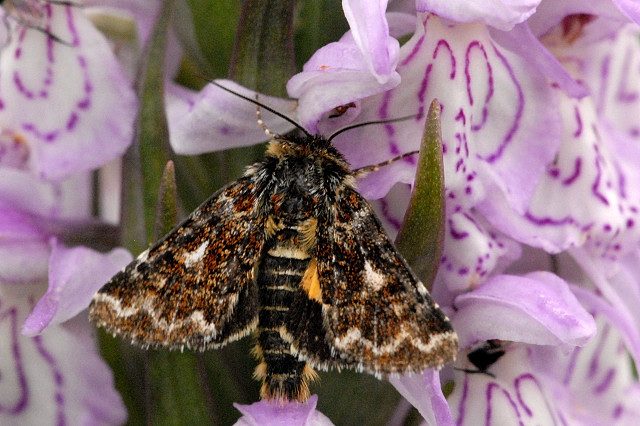
- Anarta myrtilli

Scientific classification
- Domain: Eukaryota
- Kingdom: Animalia
- Phylum: Arthropoda
- Class: Insecta
- Order: Lepidoptera
- Superfamily: Noctuoidea
- Family: Noctuidae
- Tribe: Hadenini
- Subtribe: Discestrina
- Genus: Anarta; Ochsenheimer, 1816

Synonyms
- Discestra; Trichoclea

= Anarta (moth) =

Genus of moths

Anarta is a genus of moths in the family Noctuidae.

== Species ==
- Anarta alta (Barnes & Benjamin, 1942)
- Anarta antica Smith, 1891
- Anarta arenbergeri
- Anarta chartaria (Grote, 1873)
- Anarta columbica (McDunnough, 1930)
- Anarta crotchii (Grote, 1880) (syn: Hadula chunka (Smith, 1910))
- Anarta decepta Grote, 1883 (syn: Anarta postica Smith, 1891)
- Anarta deserticola (Hampson, 1905)
- Anarta edwardsii Smith, 1888
- Anarta engedina
- Anarta farnhami (Grote, 1873)
- Anarta florida (Smith, 1900)
- Anarta fulgora (Barnes & McDunnough, 1918)
- Anarta fusculenta (Smith, 1891)
- Anarta hamata (McDunnough, 1930)
- Anarta inconcinna Smith, 1888 (=Anarta castrae (Barnes & McDunnough, 1912), Anarta ultra (Barnes & Benjamin, 1924), Anarta montanica (McDunnough, 1930))
- Anarta magna Barnes & Benjamin, 1924
- Anarta mausi Püngeler, 1904
- Anarta melaxantha Kollar, 1849
- Anarta mendax
- Anarta mendica
- Anarta mimuli Behr, 1885
- Anarta mutata (Dod, 1913)
- Anarta myrtilli – beautiful yellow underwing (Linnaeus, 1761)
- Anarta nigrolunata Packard, 1867 (sometimes placed in the genus Hadula)
- Anarta oaklandiae (McDunnough, 1937)
- Anarta obesula (Smith, 1904) (=Anarta subalbida (Barnes & Benjamin, 1924))
- Anarta oregonica (Grote, 1881)
- Anarta perpusilla Boisduval, 1829
- Anarta projecta (McDunnough, 1938)
- Anarta sabulorum
- Anarta stigmosa
- Anarta sierrae Barnes & McDunnough, 1916
