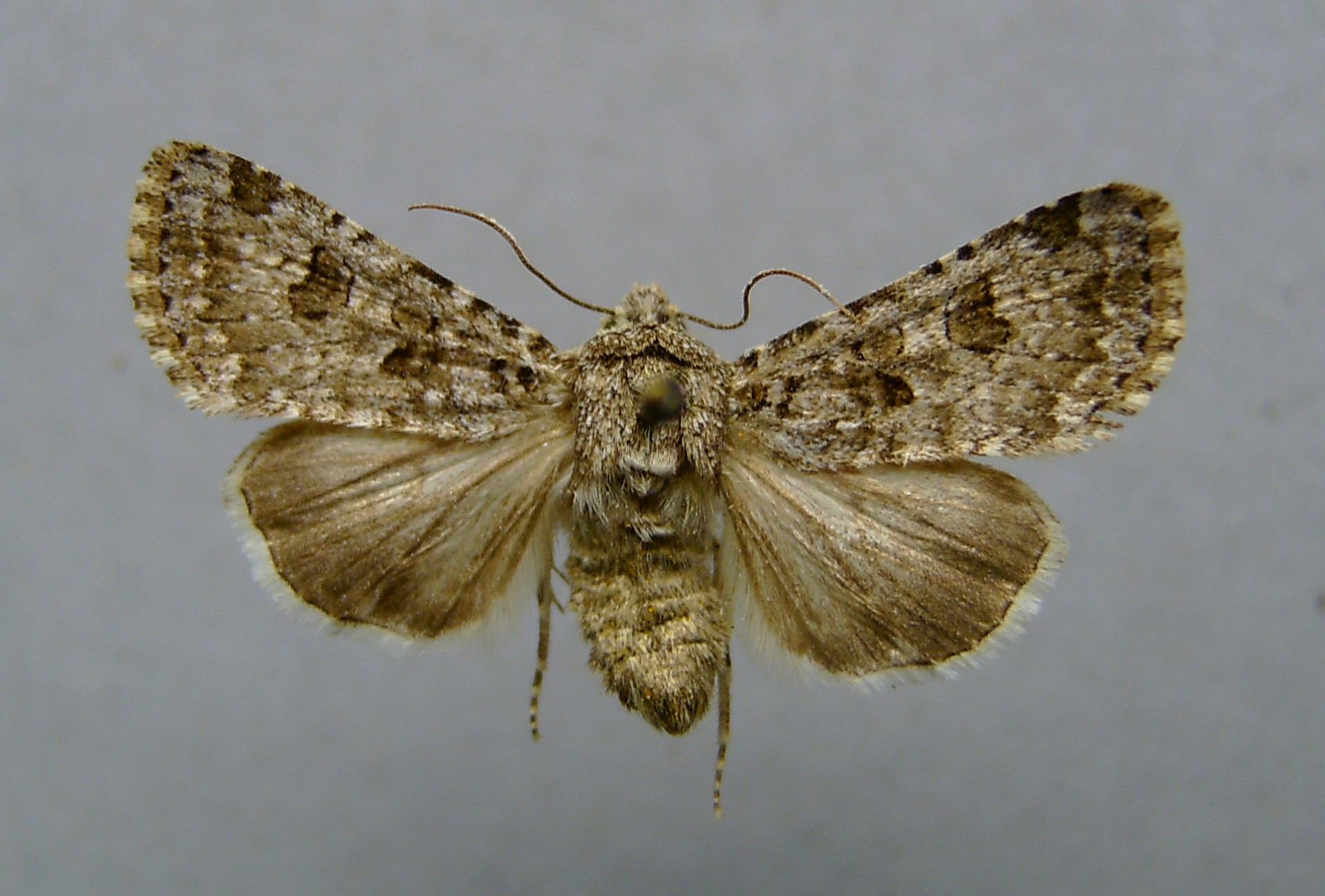

Scientific classification
- Domain: Eukaryota
- Kingdom: Animalia
- Phylum: Arthropoda
- Class: Insecta
- Order: Lepidoptera
- Superfamily: Noctuoidea
- Family: Noctuidae
- Genus: Anarta
- Species: A. stigmosa

Binomial name
- Anarta stigmosa (Christoph, 1887)

Synonyms
- Mamestra stigmosa Christoph, 1887; Discestra stigmosa; Calocestra stigmosa

= Anarta stigmosa =

Species of moth

Anarta stigmosa is a species of moth of the family Noctuidae. It is found from South-eastern Europe, Turkey, Israel and Iran to central Asia, southern Siberia, China and Mongolia.

Adults are on wing from April to May in Israel and from May to July and from August to October in Italy in two generations.

The larvae feed on various species of Atriplex, Salsola and Chenopodium and probably other halophilous shrubs.

== Subspecies ==
- Anarta stigmosa stigmosa
- Anarta stigmosa atlantica (France, Corsica, Italy)
