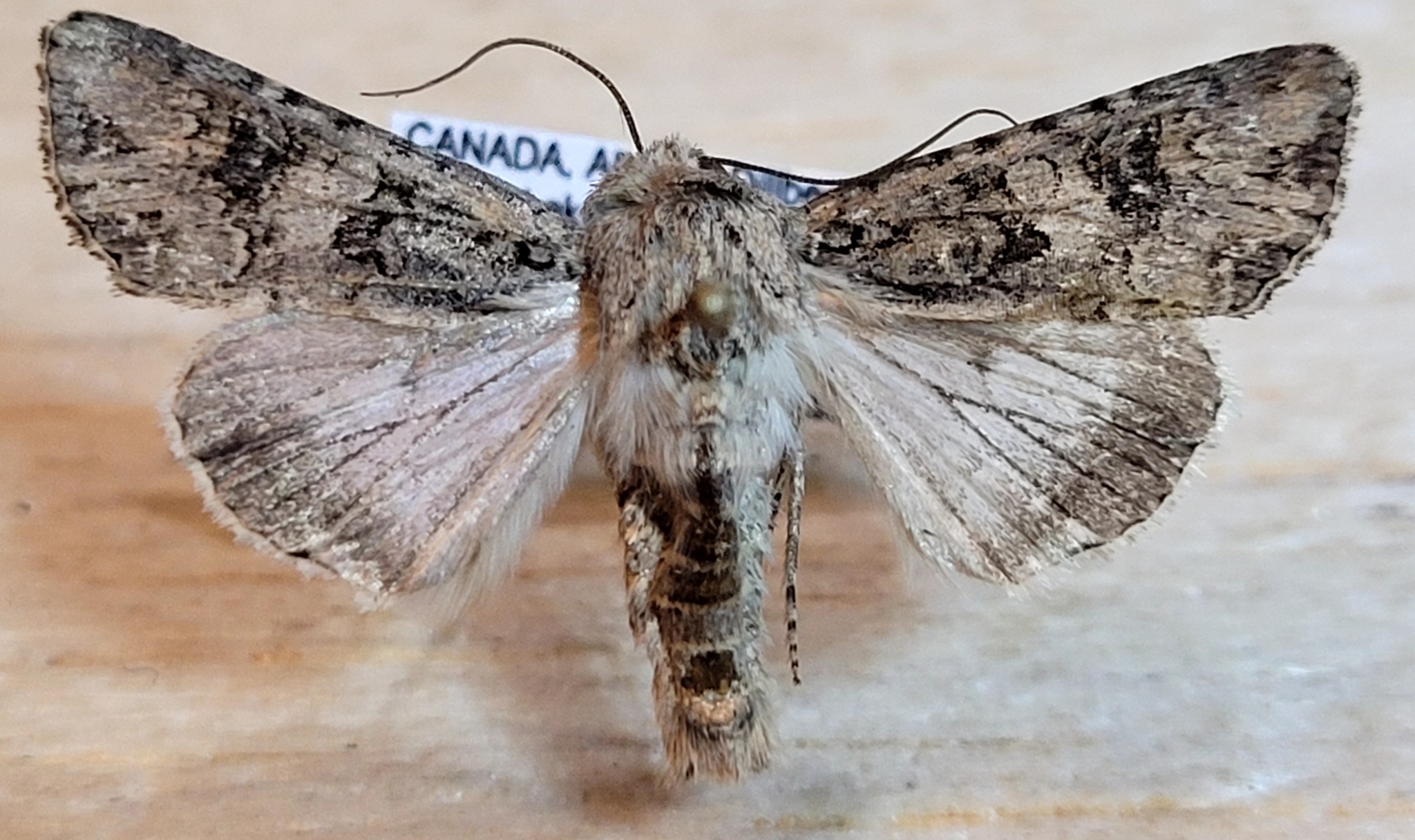

Scientific classification
- Domain: Eukaryota
- Kingdom: Animalia
- Phylum: Arthropoda
- Class: Insecta
- Order: Lepidoptera
- Superfamily: Noctuoidea
- Family: Noctuidae
- Genus: Anarta
- Species: A. obesula

Binomial name
- Anarta obesula (Smith, 1904)

Synonyms
- Anarta subalbida (Barnes & Benjamin, 1924)

= Anarta obesula =

Species of moth

Anarta obesula is a species of cutworm or dart moth in the family Noctuidae first described by Smith in 1904. It is found in North America.
