= Anarta oregonica =

Scientific classification
- Kingdom: Animalia
- Phylum: Arthropoda
- Class: Insecta
- Order: Lepidoptera
- Superfamily: Noctuoidea
- Family: Noctuidae
- Genus: Anarta
- Species: A. oregonica

Binomial name
- Anarta oregonica (Grote, 1881)

Species of moth

Anarta oregonica is a species of cutworm or dart moth in the family Noctuidae.

The MONA or Hodges number for Anarta oregonica is 10228.
