= Anarta sabulorum =

Scientific classification
- Domain: Eukaryota
- Kingdom: Animalia
- Phylum: Arthropoda
- Class: Insecta
- Order: Lepidoptera
- Superfamily: Noctuoidea
- Family: Noctuidae
- Genus: Anarta
- Species: A. sabulorum

Binomial name
- Anarta sabulorum (Alphéraky, 1882)

Synonyms
- Hadula sabulorum (Alphéraky, 1882); Mamestra sabulorum Alphéraky, 1882; Hadula leucheima Boursin, 1963; Scotogramma segnis Püngeler, 1906; Mamestra pulverata Bang-Haas, 1907; Polia cinnamomeogrisea Rotschild, 1913

Species of moth

Anarta sabulorum is a species of moth of the family Noctuidae. It is found in North Africa, the Near East and Middle East, Central Asia, Western China and Mongolia.

Adults are on wing from January to April. There is one generation per year.

== Subspecies ==
- Anarta sabulorum sabulorum
- Anarta sabulorum distincta
- Anarta sabulorum rhodina (Xinjiang)
- Anarta sabulorum segnis
- Anarta sabulorum pulverata (Malta)
