= Anarta chartaria =

Scientific classification
- Kingdom: Animalia
- Phylum: Arthropoda
- Class: Insecta
- Order: Lepidoptera
- Superfamily: Noctuoidea
- Family: Noctuidae
- Genus: Anarta
- Species: A. chartaria

Binomial name
- Anarta chartaria (Grote, 1873)

Species of moth

Anarta chartaria is a species of cutworm or dart moth in the family Noctuidae.

The MONA or Hodges number for Anarta chartaria is 10222.
