= Anarta fulgora =

Scientific classification
- Domain: Eukaryota
- Kingdom: Animalia
- Phylum: Arthropoda
- Class: Insecta
- Order: Lepidoptera
- Superfamily: Noctuoidea
- Family: Noctuidae
- Genus: Anarta
- Species: A. fulgora

Binomial name
- Anarta fulgora (Barnes & McDunnough, 1918)

Species of moth

Anarta fulgora is a species of cutworm or dart moth in the family Noctuidae first described by William Barnes and James Halliday McDunnough in 1918. It is found in North America.

The MONA or Hodges number for Anarta fulgora is 10225.
