= Anarta alta =

Scientific classification
- Domain: Eukaryota
- Kingdom: Animalia
- Phylum: Arthropoda
- Class: Insecta
- Order: Lepidoptera
- Superfamily: Noctuoidea
- Family: Noctuidae
- Genus: Anarta
- Species: A. alta

Binomial name
- Anarta alta (Barnes & Benjamin, 1924)

Species of moth

Anarta alta is a species of cutworm or dart moth in the family Noctuidae first described by William Barnes and Foster Hendrickson Benjamin in 1924. It is found in North America.

The MONA or Hodges number for Anarta alta is 10229.
