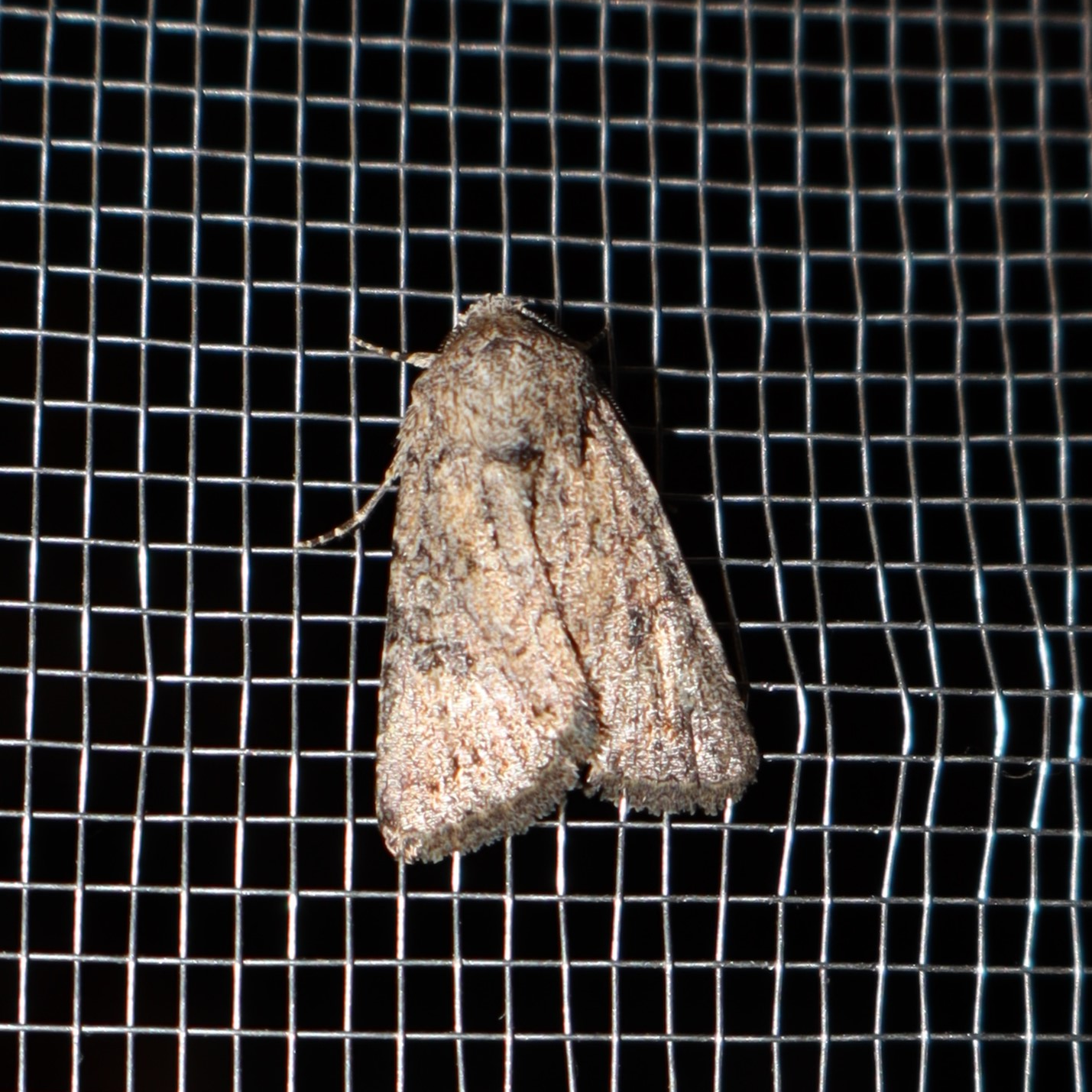

Scientific classification
- Kingdom: Animalia
- Phylum: Arthropoda
- Class: Insecta
- Order: Lepidoptera
- Superfamily: Noctuoidea
- Family: Noctuidae
- Subtribe: Discestrina
- Genus: Anarta
- Species: A. mutata

Binomial name
- Anarta mutata (Dod, 1913)

= Anarta mutata =

Species of moth

Anarta mutata, or the mutant, is a species of cutworm or dart moth in the family Noctuidae.

The MONA or Hodges number for Anarta mutata is 10224.
