= Anarta mendax =

Scientific classification
- Domain: Eukaryota
- Kingdom: Animalia
- Phylum: Arthropoda
- Class: Insecta
- Order: Lepidoptera
- Superfamily: Noctuoidea
- Family: Noctuidae
- Genus: Anarta
- Species: A. mendax

Binomial name
- Anarta mendax (Staudinger, 1879)

Synonyms
- Hadula mendax (Staudinger, 1879); Calocestra mendax Staudinger, 1879

Species of moth

Anarta mendax is a species of moth of the family Noctuidae. It is found in the south-eastern Balkans, Turkey, Israel, Lebanon and Transcaucasia.

Adults are on wing from April to May. There is one generation per year.

== Subspecies ==
- Anarta mendax mendax
- Anarta mendax occidentalis
- Anarta mendax phoenicica
