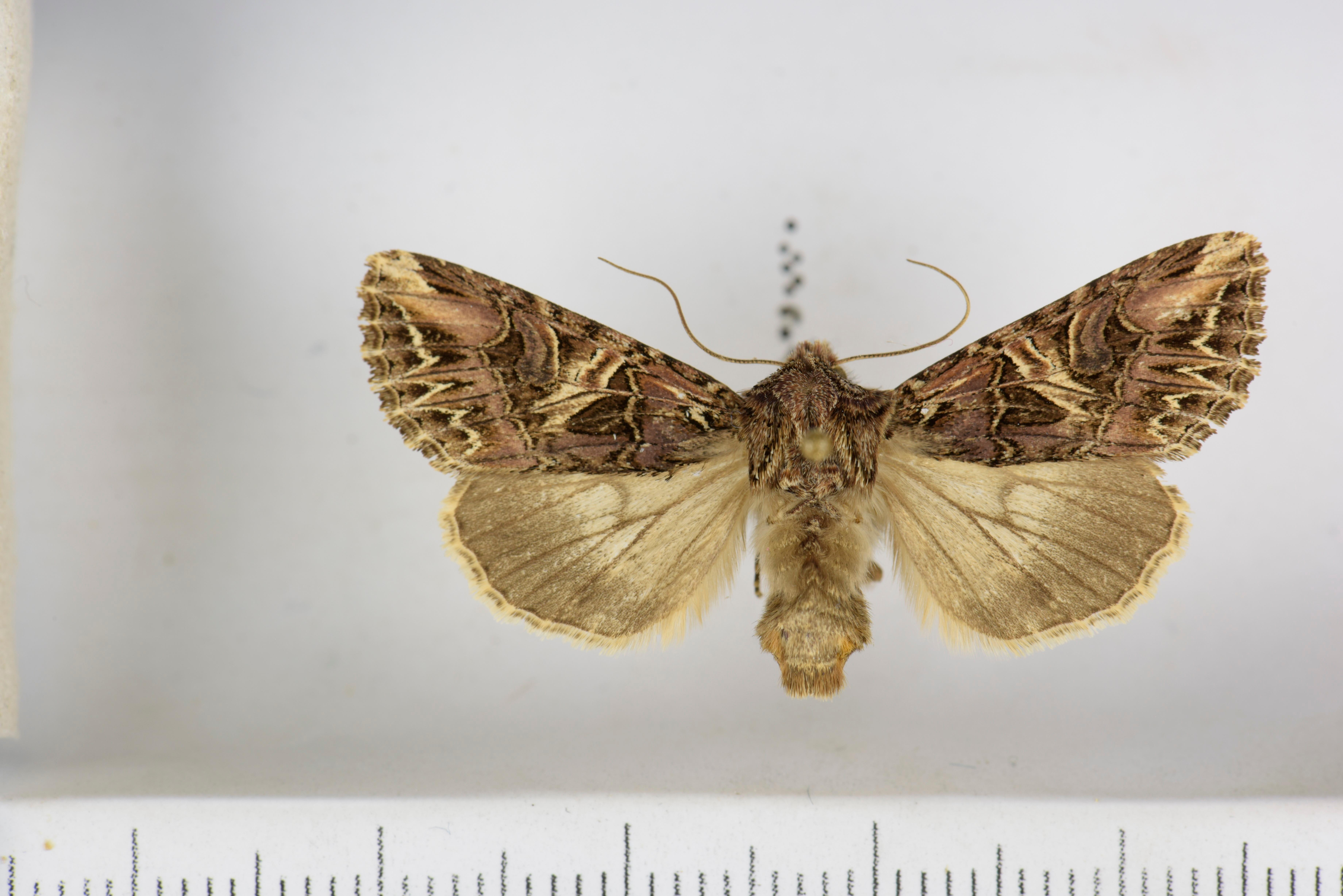

Scientific classification
- Kingdom: Animalia
- Phylum: Arthropoda
- Class: Insecta
- Order: Lepidoptera
- Superfamily: Noctuoidea
- Family: Noctuidae
- Subtribe: Discestrina
- Genus: Anarta
- Species: A. farnhami

Binomial name
- Anarta farnhami (Grote, 1873)

= Anarta farnhami =

Species of moth

Anarta farnhami is a species of cutworm or dart moth in the family Noctuidae. It is found in North America.

The MONA or Hodges number for Anarta farnhami is 10232.

== Subspecies ==
These two subspecies belong to the species Anarta farnhami:

- Anarta farnhami farnhami
- Anarta farnhami palaearctica (Hacker, 1998)
