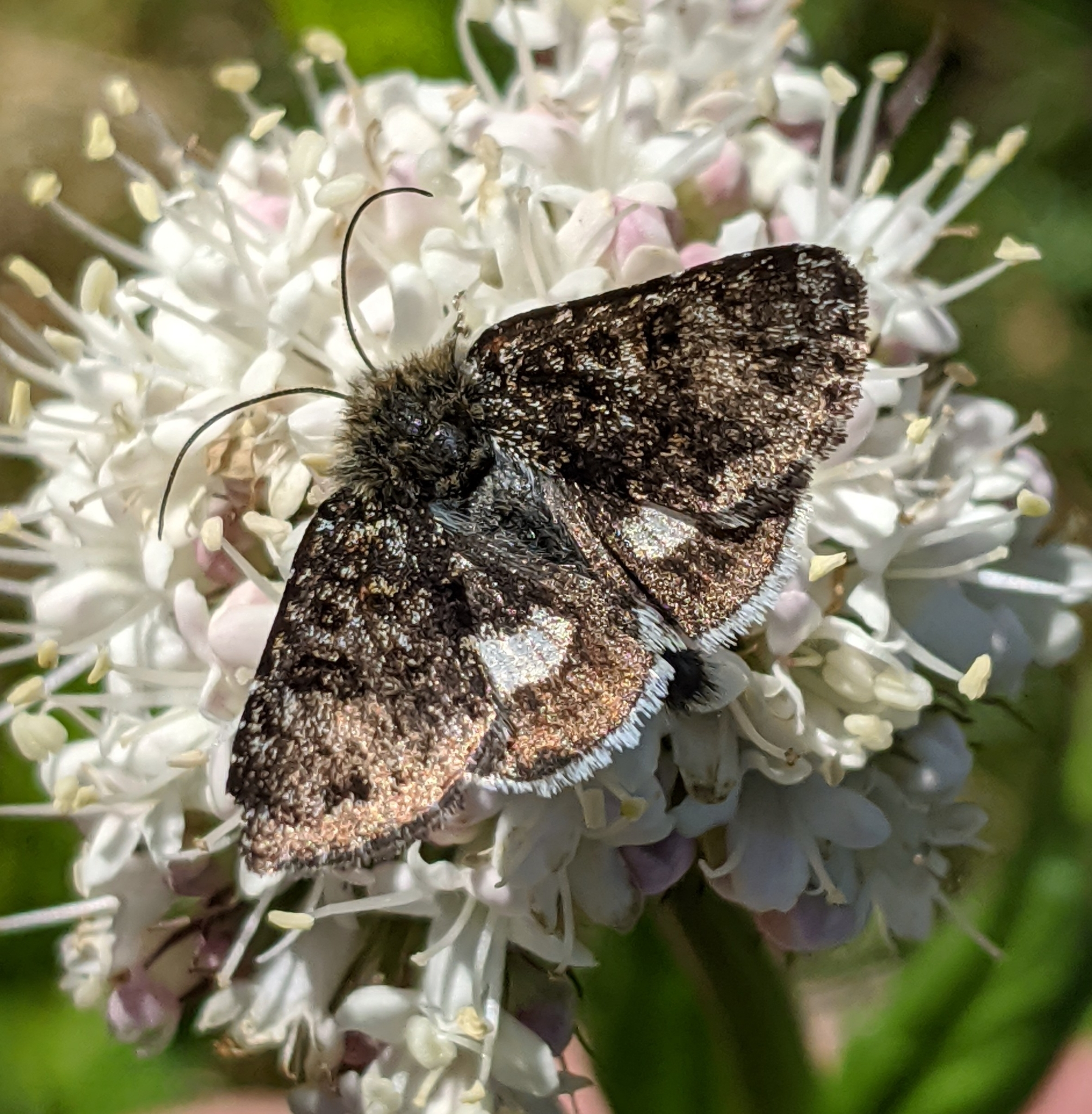
- Anarta nigrolunata, Canada

Scientific classification
- Kingdom: Animalia
- Phylum: Arthropoda
- Clade: Pancrustacea
- Class: Insecta
- Order: Lepidoptera
- Superfamily: Noctuoidea
- Family: Noctuidae
- Genus: Anarta
- Species: A. nigrolunata

Binomial name
- Anarta nigrolunata Packard, 1867

Synonyms
- Hadula nigrolunata

= Anarta nigrolunata =

Species of moth

Anarta nigrolunata is a moth in the family Noctuidae first described by Alpheus Spring Packard in 1867. It is found in the Arctic and alpine regions of the United States and Canada.

Anarta melanopa was considered a synonym of Hadula nigrolunata, but J. Donald Lafontaine and James T. Troubridge state that there are "numerous consistent differences that warrant recognizing them as separate species".
