= Anarta inconcinna =

Scientific classification
- Domain: Eukaryota
- Kingdom: Animalia
- Phylum: Arthropoda
- Class: Insecta
- Order: Lepidoptera
- Superfamily: Noctuoidea
- Family: Noctuidae
- Genus: Anarta
- Species: A. inconcinna

Binomial name
- Anarta inconcinna (Smith, 1888)

Synonyms
- Anarta castrae (Barnes & McDunnough, 1912); Anarta montanica (McDunnough, 1930); Anarta ultra (Barnes & Benjamin, 1924); Scotogramma inconcinna Smith, 1888

Species of moth

Anarta inconcinna is a species of cutworm or dart moth in the family Noctuidae. It was first described by Smith in 1888 and it is found in North America.
