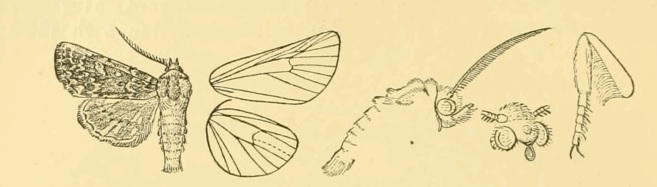

Scientific classification
- Domain: Eukaryota
- Kingdom: Animalia
- Phylum: Arthropoda
- Class: Insecta
- Order: Lepidoptera
- Superfamily: Noctuoidea
- Family: Noctuidae
- Genus: Anarta
- Species: A. deserticola

Binomial name
- Anarta deserticola (Hampson, 1905)

Synonyms
- Aglosesstra deserticola Hampson, 1905; Discestra deserticola; Hadula deserticola; Hadula mariaeludovicae Lucas, 1914; Derthisa affinis Rothschild, 1914

= Anarta deserticola =

Species of moth

Anarta deserticola is a moth of the family Noctuidae. It was described by George Hampson in 1905. It is found along the coast of North Africa (from Egypt to Morocco) and on Malta.

The wingspan is about 36 mm. Adults are on wing from October to November.
