= Anarta engedina =

Scientific classification
- Domain: Eukaryota
- Kingdom: Animalia
- Phylum: Arthropoda
- Class: Insecta
- Order: Lepidoptera
- Superfamily: Noctuoidea
- Family: Noctuidae
- Genus: Anarta
- Species: A. engedina

Binomial name
- Anarta engedina (Hacker, 1998)

Synonyms
- Hadula engedina Hacker, 1998

Species of moth

Anarta engedina is a species of moth of the family Noctuidae. It is probably endemic to the Levant (it has only been recorded from Israel). It is found in the arid region of 'En Gedi and in the semi-arid region in the upper elevations of the Judean Desert near Alon and Kfar Gedi.

Adults are on wing from January to March. There is one generation per year.
