= Anarta mendica =

Scientific classification
- Kingdom: Animalia
- Phylum: Arthropoda
- Class: Insecta
- Order: Lepidoptera
- Superfamily: Noctuoidea
- Family: Noctuidae
- Genus: Anarta
- Species: A. mendica

Binomial name
- Anarta mendica (Staudinger, 1879)

Synonyms
- Hadula mendica (Staudinger, 1895); Mamestra mendica Staudinger, 1895; Discestra mendica

Species of moth

Anarta mendica is a species of moth of the family Noctuidae. It is found in Turkey, Armenia, Azerbaijan, Israel and Lebanon.

Adults are on wing from April to June. There is one generation per year.

== Subspecies ==
- Anarta mendica mendica
- Anarta mendica mendosa
