= Thargelia gigantea =

Scientific classification
- Domain: Eukaryota
- Kingdom: Animalia
- Phylum: Arthropoda
- Class: Insecta
- Order: Lepidoptera
- Superfamily: Noctuoidea
- Family: Noctuidae
- Genus: Thargiela
- Species: T. gigantea

Binomial name
- Thargelia gigantea Rebel, 1909

Synonyms
- Hadula gigantea (Rebel, 1909); Odontelia griseola Rothschild, 1913; Odontelia grazianii Krüger, 1933

Species of moth

Thargelia gigantea is a species of moth of the family Noctuidae. It is found from Morocco to Algeria, Libya, Israel and the Sinai in Egypt.

Adults are on wing from January to April. There is one generation per year.
