= Anarta crotchii =

Scientific classification
- Kingdom: Animalia
- Phylum: Arthropoda
- Class: Insecta
- Order: Lepidoptera
- Superfamily: Noctuoidea
- Family: Noctuidae
- Genus: Anarta
- Species: A. crotchii

Binomial name
- Anarta crotchii (Grote, 1880)

Synonyms
- Anarta chunka (Smith, 1910)

Species of moth

Anarta crotchii is a species of cutworm or dart moth in the family of Noctuidae.

The MONA or Hodges number for Anarta crotchii is 10233.
