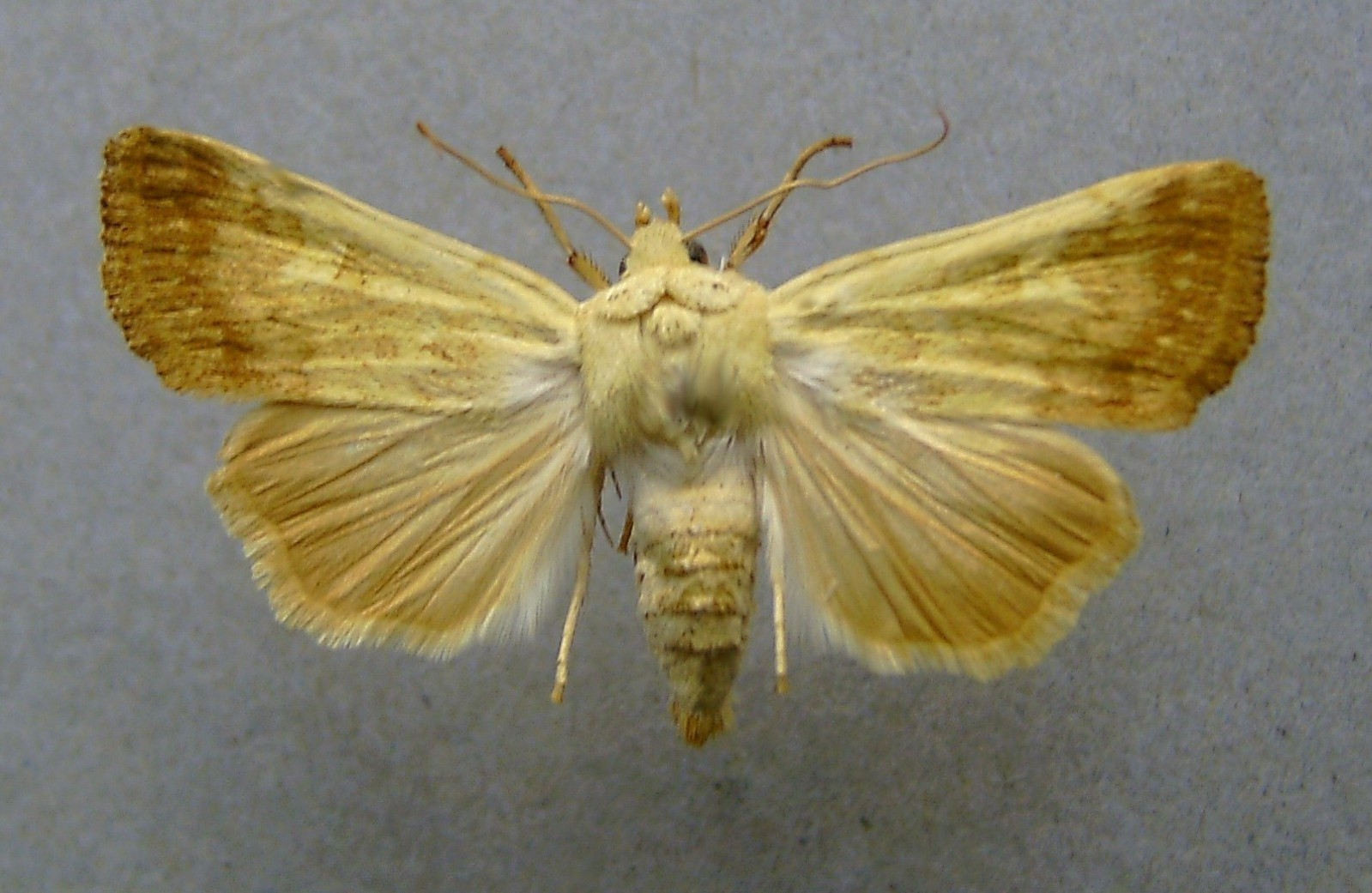
- Yigoga flavina

Scientific classification
- Domain: Eukaryota
- Kingdom: Animalia
- Phylum: Arthropoda
- Class: Insecta
- Order: Lepidoptera
- Superfamily: Noctuoidea
- Family: Noctuidae
- Subfamily: Noctuinae
- Genus: Yigoga; Nye, 1975

= Yigoga =

Genus of moths

Yigoga is a genus of moths of the family Noctuidae, it was placed as a synonym of Dichagyris by Lafontain & Fibiger in 2003.

== Selected former species ==
- Yigoga celsicola (Bellier, 1859)
- Yigoga fidelis (de Joannis, 1903)
- Yigoga flavina (Herrich-Schäffer, 1852)
- Yigoga forcipula (Denis & Schiffermüller, 1775)
- Yigoga gracilis (Wagner, 1929)
- Yigoga insula Fibiger, 1997
- Yigoga iranicola Koçak, 1980
- Yigoga libanicola (Corti & Draudt, 1933)
- Yigoga lutescens (Eversmann, 1844)
- Yigoga nachadira (Brandt, 1941)
- Yigoga nigrescens (Höfner, 1888)
- Yigoga orientis (Alphéraky, 1882)
- Yigoga romanovi (Christoph, 1885)
- Yigoga serraticornis (Staudinger, 1897)
- Yigoga signifera (Denis & Schiffermüller, 1775)
- Yigoga soror Fibiger, 1997
- Yigoga truculenta (Lederer, 1853)
