= Stenosomides =

Scientific classification
- Domain: Eukaryota
- Kingdom: Animalia
- Phylum: Arthropoda
- Class: Insecta
- Order: Lepidoptera
- Superfamily: Noctuoidea
- Family: Noctuidae
- Subfamily: Noctuinae
- Genus: Stenosomides; Strand, 1942

Genus of moths

Stenosomides was a formerly recognized genus of moths of the family Noctuidae; it is now considered a subgenus of Dichagyris.

== Selected former species ==
- Stenosomides mansoura (Chrétien, 1911)
- Stenosomides spissilinea (Staudinger, 1896)
- Stenosomides sureyae (Draudt, 1938)
