= Hadena clara =

Scientific classification
- Domain: Eukaryota
- Kingdom: Animalia
- Phylum: Arthropoda
- Class: Insecta
- Order: Lepidoptera
- Superfamily: Noctuoidea
- Family: Noctuidae
- Genus: Hadena
- Species: H. clara

Binomial name
- Hadena clara (Staudinger, 1901)

Synonyms
- Dianthoecia caesia var. clara Staudinger, 1901; Dianthoecia hyrcana Draudt, 1933; Harmodia caesia transiens Draudt, 1936; Harmodia gladys Wiltshire, 1947

Species of moth

Hadena clara is a species of moth of the family Noctuidae. It is found in Morocco, southern Europe, Turkey, Armenia, Azerbaijan, the Caucasus region, Israel, Lebanon, Syria and Iran.

== Description ==
Warren states E. clara Stgr. Forewing ochreous whitish, dusted with dark; the lines fairly distinct; the stigmata obscure; hindwing ochreous white, the termen tinged with fuscous. Turkestan; — ab. celebrata Alph. [now Dichagyris celebrata ] is a dark form with the markings plainer, while ab. verecunda Pung. (7e) [now Dichagyris verecunda] is altogether paler and marked only by two dark costal spots.

== Subspecies ==
- Hadena clara macedonica (Macedonia)
- Hadena clara gladys (northern Iran)
- Hadena clara weissi (Caucasus)
- Hadena clara alpina (France)
- Hadena clara dujardini (France)
- Hadena clara nevadensis (Spain)
- Hadena clara atlantis (Morocco)

== Biology ==
Adults are on wing from May to June. There is one generation per year.

The larvae probably feed on capsules of Caryophyllaceae species.
