= Albocosta =

Scientific classification
- Domain: Eukaryota
- Kingdom: Animalia
- Phylum: Arthropoda
- Class: Insecta
- Order: Lepidoptera
- Superfamily: Noctuoidea
- Family: Noctuidae
- Subfamily: Noctuinae
- Genus: Albocosta; Fibiger & Lafontaine, 1997

Genus of moths

Albocosta is a genus of moths in the family Noctuidae.

== Species ==
- Albocosta dulcis (Alphéraky, 1892)
- Albocosta ellapsa (Corti, 1927)
- Albocosta juldussi (Alphéraky, 1882)
- Albocosta lasciva (Staudinger, 1888)
- Albocosta musiva (Hübner, [1803])
- Albocosta musivula (Staudinger, 1895)
- Albocosta obliqua (Corti & Draudt, 1933)
- Albocosta refulgens (Warren, 1909)
- Albocosta stentzi (Lederer, 1853)
- Albocosta triangularis (Moore, 1867)
- Albocosta ulrici (Corti & Draudt, 1933)
