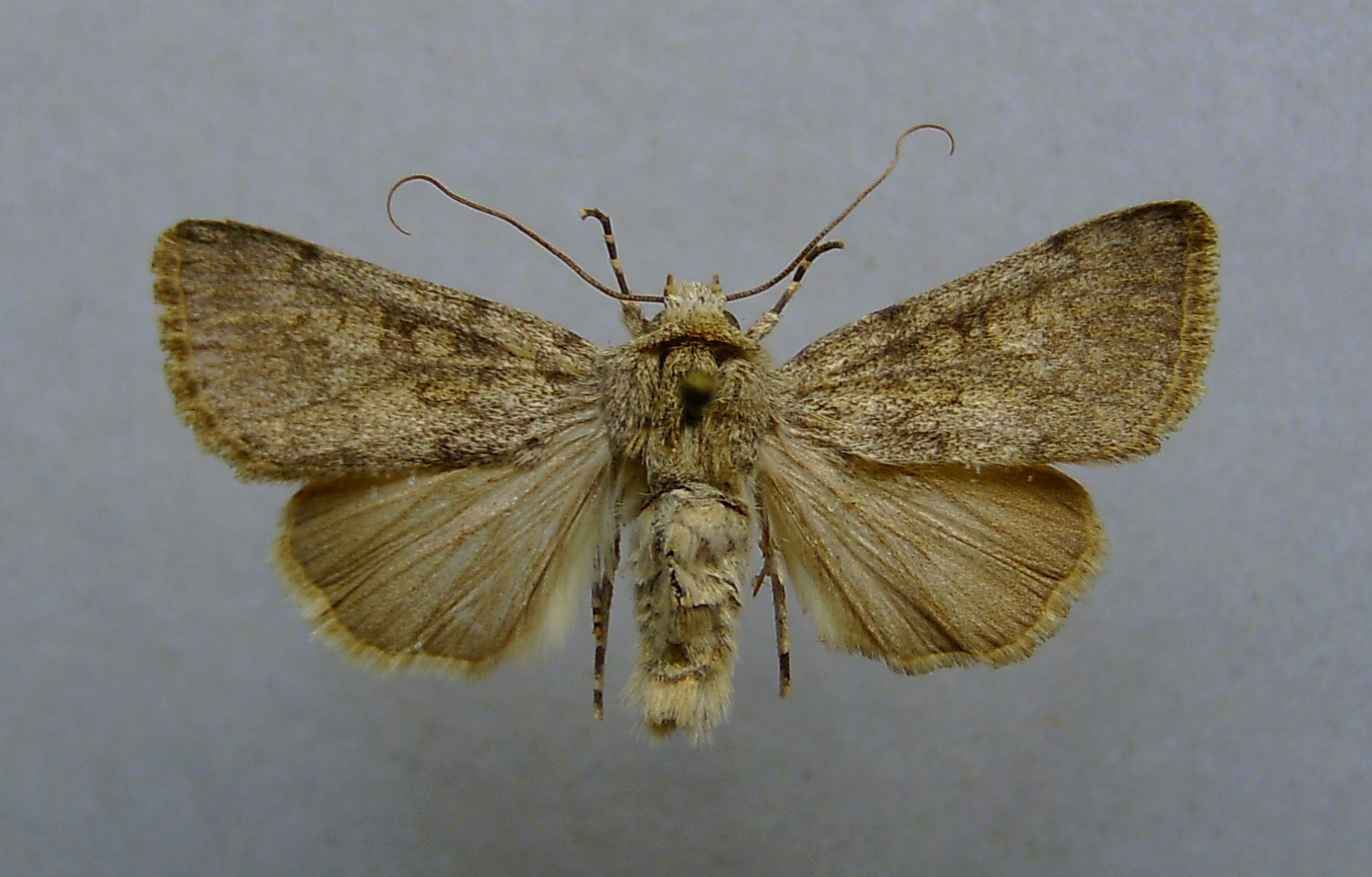

Scientific classification
- Domain: Eukaryota
- Kingdom: Animalia
- Phylum: Arthropoda
- Class: Insecta
- Order: Lepidoptera
- Superfamily: Noctuoidea
- Family: Noctuidae
- Genus: Dichagyris
- Species: D. renigera

Binomial name
- Dichagyris renigera (Hübner, 1808)

Synonyms
- Noctua renigera Hübner, [1808]; Ochropleura renigera; Lycophotia renigera var. contermina Corti, 1930; Agrotis renigera caerulescens Wagner, 1931 (preocc.); Polia dumosa Donzel, 1837; Agrotis renigera var. funebris Staudinger, [1892]; Agrotis renigera ochridana Thurner, 1936; Agrotis (Rhyacia) renigera var. funestissima Bubacek, 1926; Agrotis (Rhyacia) renigera hispanicola Schwingenschuss, 1962; Ochropleura (Dichagyris) renigera nigrescentella Leraut, 1980; Dichagyris murciensis Calle, 1983; Dichagyris nigrescens Kitt, 1925 (preocc.); Agrotis renigera argentina Caradja, 1930

= Dichagyris renigera =

Species of moth

Dichagyris renigera is a moth of the family Noctuidae. It is found in South- and Southeast-Europe, Armenia, Caucasus and Turkey.

== Description ==
Warren (1914) states R. renigera Hbn. (= dumosa Donz.) (13 e). Forewing greyish ochreous, thickly dusted with fuscous or grey, especially the space between outer and submarginal lines; markings obscure; lines marked by dark spots on costa; stigmata faintly yellowish; hindwing greyish fuscous. A south European species, found in Spain, France, Italy, Switzerland, Carinthia, Bosnia, and Hungary; also in Armenia, Asia Minor, Syria, Persia, Turkestan, and Mongolia: the Asiatic forms differ in colouration from the European; they have been separated by Staudinger as ab. turana Stgr.[syn Dichagyris devota (Christoph, 1884), which is pale ochreous, with the grey tinge less conspicuous: ab. intermedia Stgr. [syn Dichagyris forficula (Eversmann, 1851)] (13 e), which is dark violaceous grey with markings obscure; ab. erubescens Stgr., in which the ochreous deepens into fulvous or reddish, and the markings become distinct; and ab. funebris Stgr (13 e), which is leaden grey; but erubescens [species Dichagyris erubescens (Staudinger, [1892] and intermedia [syn Dichagyris forficula (Eversmann, 1851)] may well form a species apart, as Staudinger himself suggested.

== Subspecies ==
- Dichagyris renigera renigera (Alps)
- Dichagyris renigera funetissima (Bubacek, 1926) (Spain, Pyrenees)
- Dichagyris renigera argentina (Caradja, 1930)

== Biology ==
There is one generation per year. The moth occurs from early June to early August, visits sugar and comes to light.

== Reading ==
- Michael Fibiger: Noctuidae Europaeae Volume 1, Entomological Press, Søro 1990, ISBN 87-89430-01-8, p. 121–123
