= Pseudorthosia =

Scientific classification
- Kingdom: Animalia
- Phylum: Arthropoda
- Clade: Pancrustacea
- Class: Insecta
- Order: Lepidoptera
- Superfamily: Noctuoidea
- Family: Noctuidae
- Genus: Dichagyris
- Subgenus: Pseudorthosia; Grote, 1874

Genus of moths

Pseudorthosia was a genus of moths of the family Noctuidae, it is now considered a subgenus of Dichagyris.

== Species ==
- Dichagyris variabilis Grote, 1874
