= Dichagyris herculea =

Scientific classification
- Domain: Eukaryota
- Kingdom: Animalia
- Phylum: Arthropoda
- Class: Insecta
- Order: Lepidoptera
- Superfamily: Noctuoidea
- Family: Noctuidae
- Genus: Dichagyris
- Species: D. herculea

Binomial name
- Dichagyris herculea Corti & Draudt, 1933

Synonyms
- Basistriga herculea Corti & Draudt, 1933

Species of moth

Dichagyris herculea is a moth of the family Noctuidae. It is found in Afghanistan, Pakistan, India, Tibet, and Nepal.

It was first described as a form of Rhyacia flammatra (which is now Dichagyris flammatra), Rhyacia flammatra f. herculea.
