= The Photo Ark =

Animal photography project

- Owner: National Geographic
- Founder: Joel Sartore
- Key people: Joel Sartore
- Website: www.nationalgeographic.org/projects/photo-ark/

The Photo Ark is a National Geographic project, led by photographer Joel Sartore, with the goal of photographing all species living in zoos and wildlife sanctuaries around the globe in order to inspire action to save wildlife.

The project has been documented in a series of books and in a three-part documentary first shown on PBS and then released to home video. A selection of photographs from the project has been exhibited in various museums, zoos, and exhibition halls around the world. The documentary, RARE: Creatures of The Photo Ark, was awarded the Best Conservation Film award in 2018. The Photo Ark was featured on American television program 60 Minutes, with the episode first airing on October 14, 2018.

== Goals ==
The Photo Ark project, led by Joel Sartore in association with National Geographic, has the goal of inspiring action through education, and to help save wildlife by supporting conservation efforts.

It is a multiyear effort which originally intended to document 12,000 species living in zoos and wildlife sanctuaries. In November 2021, the 12,000th species was photographed by Sartore who was 59 at the time, and the new goal was announced as being 15,000 species, which Sartore anticipated would take him another 10 to 15 years.

According to a February 2017 press release by National Geographic, one-half of Earth's animal species could go extinct by 2100. Since starting the project, Sartore says several species he photographed are now extinct.

== Origins ==
Sartore gained a love of nature while growing up in Nebraska. He was amazed by the idea of species going extinct, and thought that he would never see such occur in his lifetime. However, now he believes that in the 11 years he has worked on the Photo Ark project, he has seen 10 go extinct. In a March 2018 interview, Sartore said that he went to the Omaha zoo regularly as a child, getting to know the various animals. He says that his parents "made sure he was out in nature and appreciated it", which he says made all the difference.

In a February 2018 interview, Sartore said that he began the Ark project about 12 years ago when he was caring for his three young children while his wife was being treated for cancer, leading Sartore to consider his own future. "That's how the Ark got started, and I've been going at it ever since."

In an April 2018 interview, Sartore said he had been a National Geographic photographer for over 27 years, and although he worked for 15 years doing various conservation stories, the impact was not enough to "stop the extinction crisis". So he realized that maybe "very simple portraits lit exquisitely so you can see the beauty and the color, looking animals directly in the eye with no distractions, would be the way to do it."

== Progress ==
National Geographic reported on the project's status during significant milestones:

- The first animal to be photographed for the project was the naked mole-rat living at the Lincoln Children's Zoo.
- In September 2017, the 7,000th animal photographed for the project was announced: the Leadbeater's possum, a critically endangered marsupial which is native to the acacia forests of central Victoria in Australia.
- In May 2018, the 8,000th animal was announced: the semiaquatic Pyrenean desman.
- In December 2018, the 9,000th animal was announced: the Bandula barb, a colorful but critically endangered fish found in one stream in Sri Lanka.
- In May 2020 the 10,000th animal was announced: the güiña, which is the smallest wildcat in the Americas. National Geographic reported that "This pivotal milestone means that Sartore is about two-thirds of the way toward completing the National Geographic Photo Ark."
- In February 2021, the 11,000th animal was announced: the long-toothed dart moth (Dichagyris longidens), saying the photo may be the first one to capture a living representative of the species.
- In November 2021, the 12,000th animal was announced: the Arabian cobra, which until 2009 was classified as a subspecies of the Egyptian cobra.
- In July 2022, the 13,000th animal was announced: the spoon-billed sandpiper (Calidris pygmaea), which is listed as critically endangered by the International Union for Conservation of Nature.
- In May 2023, the 14,000th animal was announced: the Indochinese green magpie (Cissa hypoleuca), this individual in particular was named Jolie and rescued from the illegal wildlife trade.
- In November 2023, the 15,000th animal was announced: the Miami tiger beetle (Cicindelidia floridana), which was thought to be extinct until rediscovered in 2007.

== The Photo Ark and related books ==
The project has been documented in a series of books:

- Rare: Portraits of America's Endangered Species. 2010. ISBN 1-4262-0575-9. Precursor to The Photo Ark project.
- Animal Ark: Celebrating our Wild World in Poetry and Pictures. National Geographic Kids, 2017. ISBN 978-1426327674.
- The Photo Ark: One Man's Quest to Document the World's Animals. 2017. ISBN 9781426217777.
- Birds Of The Photo Ark. 2018. ISBN 978-1426218989.
- The Photo Ark Vanishing: The World's Most Vulnerable Animals. 2019. ISBN 978-1426220593.

== Rare: Creatures of The Photo Ark ==
Beginning in July 2017, PBS broadcast a three-part film, Rare: Creatures of The Photo Ark, which documented highlights of the project. Rare was later released for purchase in both Blu-ray and DVD format, and was also made available on Amazon Prime. As of February 2018, a second season was being discussed with National Geographic.

In a February 2018 interview, Rare director Chun-Wei Yi said that he met Sartore at National Geographic Television & Film, in 2006 or 2007, soon after he started the Photo Ark. In the course of making the series, Sartore photographed his 5,000th species.

=== Episodes ===
No.	Title	Original release date
1	"Episode 1"	July 18, 2017
Sartore travels to Madagascar to photograph a creature found nowhere else: the rare Decken’s sifaka. Sartore also travels to the Florida Keys to photograph the Lower Keys marsh rabbit, listed as endangered due to rising sea water levels.
2	"Episode 2"	July 25, 2017
Sartore travels to Spain to photograph the Iberian lynx, formerly the rarest cat on Earth. The next stop is China to witness the artificially insemination of the last known female Yangtze giant softshell turtle. Then in Cameroon, Sartore has the opportunity to see the rarest of the great apes in the world: the Cross River gorilla. Sartore also extracts photographs beetles from cow dung because, as he says, every creature is important.
3	"Episode 3"	August 1, 2017
Sartore photographs insects which look to be from science fiction. Then in the Czech Republic, he photographs one of the last five northern white rhinos left on the Earth. In New Zealand, Sartore joins a Rowi kiwi egg rescue, documenting the effort to prevent the species' extinction.

== Documentary scheduled for 2020 ==
In February 2019, it was announced that National Geographic and WGBH-Boston had joined forces to produce a "two-hour event special" about The Photo Ark, which would air on October 17, 2020.

== Exhibitions ==
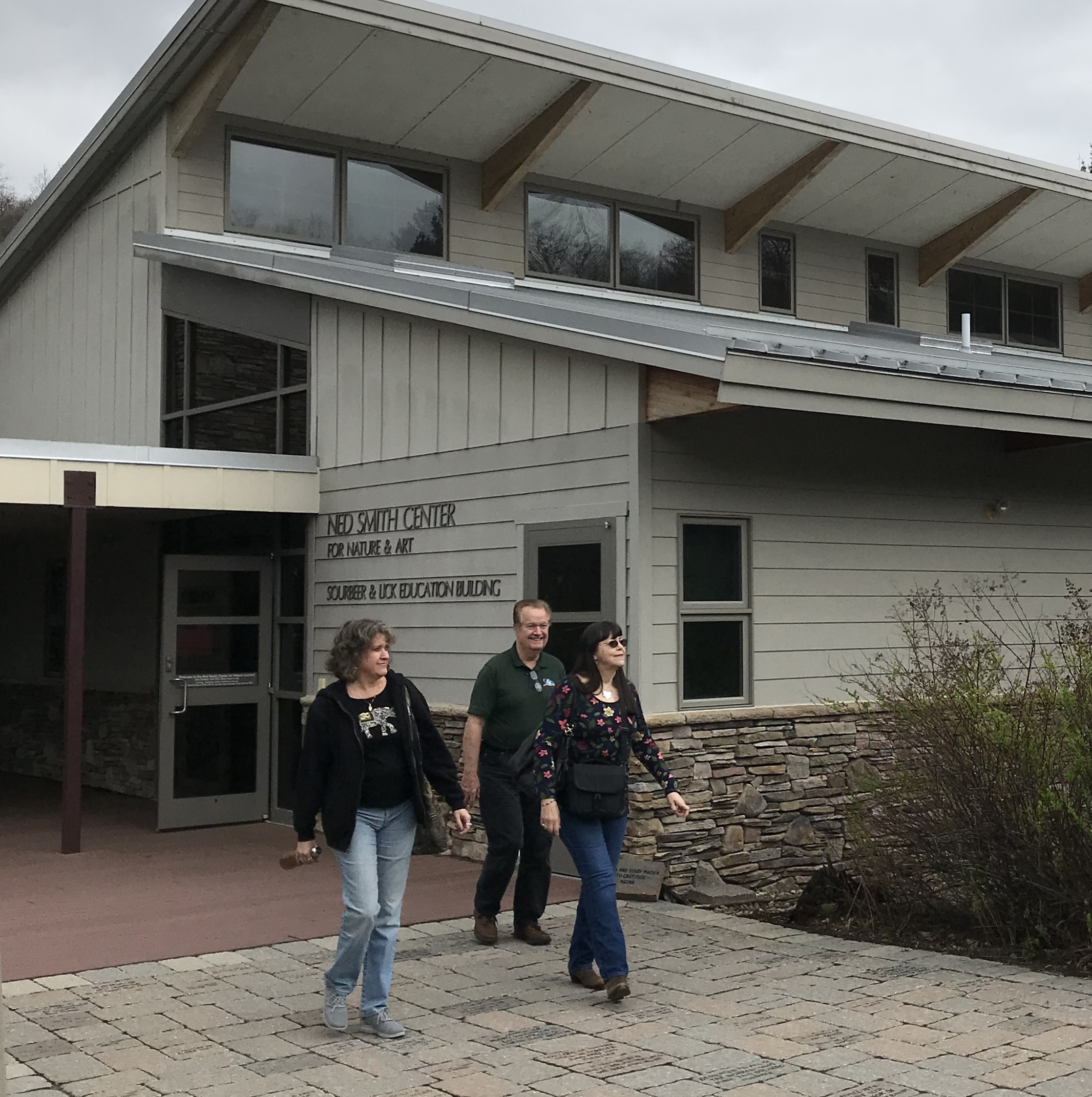
The Ned Smith Center for Nature and Art exhibiting The Photo Ark

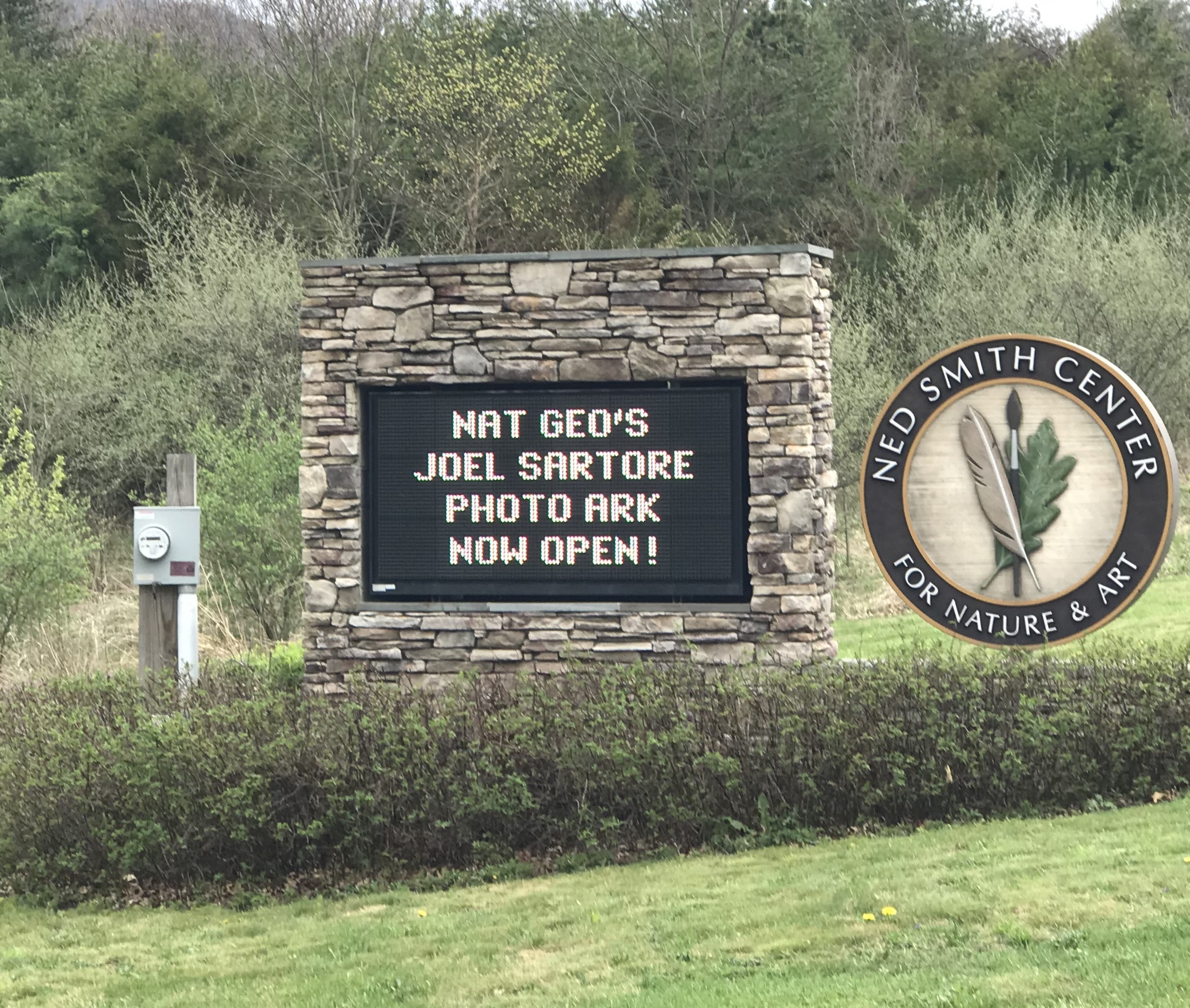
The Photo Ark on exhibit in Pennsylvania

To spread awareness of this project, a selection of photographs from The Photo Ark has been exhibited in various museums, zoos, and exhibition halls around the world, including the following locations:

- Auditorium Parco della Musica, Rome, Italy, 2017
- Cincinnati Zoo and Botanical Garden, Cincinnati, Ohio, 2017
- Dallas Zoo, Dallas, Texas, 2017
- Henry Doorly Zoo and Aquarium, Omaha, Nebraska, 2017
- Hickory Museum of Art, Hickory, North Carolina, 2017
- Melbourne Zoo, Melbourne, Australia, 2017
- National Museum of Wildlife Art, Jackson, Wyoming, 2017
- San Diego Natural History Museum, San Diego, California, 2017
- National Stadium, Warsaw, Warsaw, Poland, 2017
- The War Memorial of Korea Museum, Seoul, South Korea, 2017
- Los Angeles Zoo and Botanical Gardens, Los Angeles, California, 2018
- Ned Smith Center for Nature and Art Amphitheater, Millersburg, Pennsylvania, 2018
- Museon, The Hague, Netherlands, 2018
- Museum of Natural History, Porto, Portugal, 2018
- Woodland Park Zoo, Seattle, Washington, 2018
- Annenberg Space for Photography, Los Angeles, California, 2018

== Awards ==
In February 2018, RARE: Creatures of The Photo Ark was awarded Best Conservation Film at the New York WILD Film Festival, held at The Explorers Club in Manhattan.

== Reception ==
Mike Norton, executive vice president of Norton Outdoor Advertising wrote in Billboard Insider that "In this era of division and hyper-partisanship, Photo Ark is a uniting cause. Photo Ark has earned support and respect across the political spectrum, from Harrison Ford to hunters."

In March 2017, Publishers Weekly reviewed The Photo Ark, commenting that the photos use black-and-white backgrounds to highlight the animals, and snapshots of the photographing process are included as well. The article says that "Sartore more than succeeds in his goal to provide people with an opportunity to become aware of these animals, many endangered, before they disappear."

In July 2017, The National Press Photographers Association reported that Sartore's goal is to photograph animals before they go extinct, but surmises that he may run out of time for many species. "It has taken 10 years so far to photograph about 6,500 of the estimated 12,000 species he wants to record. Sartore estimates it will take him 15 more years to finish... The first batch appears in The Photo Ark, and its assortment of creatures is fascinating... [The book] will change the way you think of turning a field or forest into the next mall or housing development." The 12,000th species was added to the Ark in November 2021, and a new goal of photographing 15,000 species was set.

== See also ==
- Racing Extinction
