= Dichagyris anastasia =

Scientific classification
- Domain: Eukaryota
- Kingdom: Animalia
- Phylum: Arthropoda
- Class: Insecta
- Order: Lepidoptera
- Superfamily: Noctuoidea
- Family: Noctuidae
- Genus: Dichagyris
- Species: D. anastasia

Binomial name
- Dichagyris anastasia (Draudt, 1936)

Species of moth

Dichagyris anastasia is a moth of the family Noctuidae. It is found in eastern Turkey, Iraq, Iran and Israel.

Adults are on wing from August to November. There is one generation per year.
