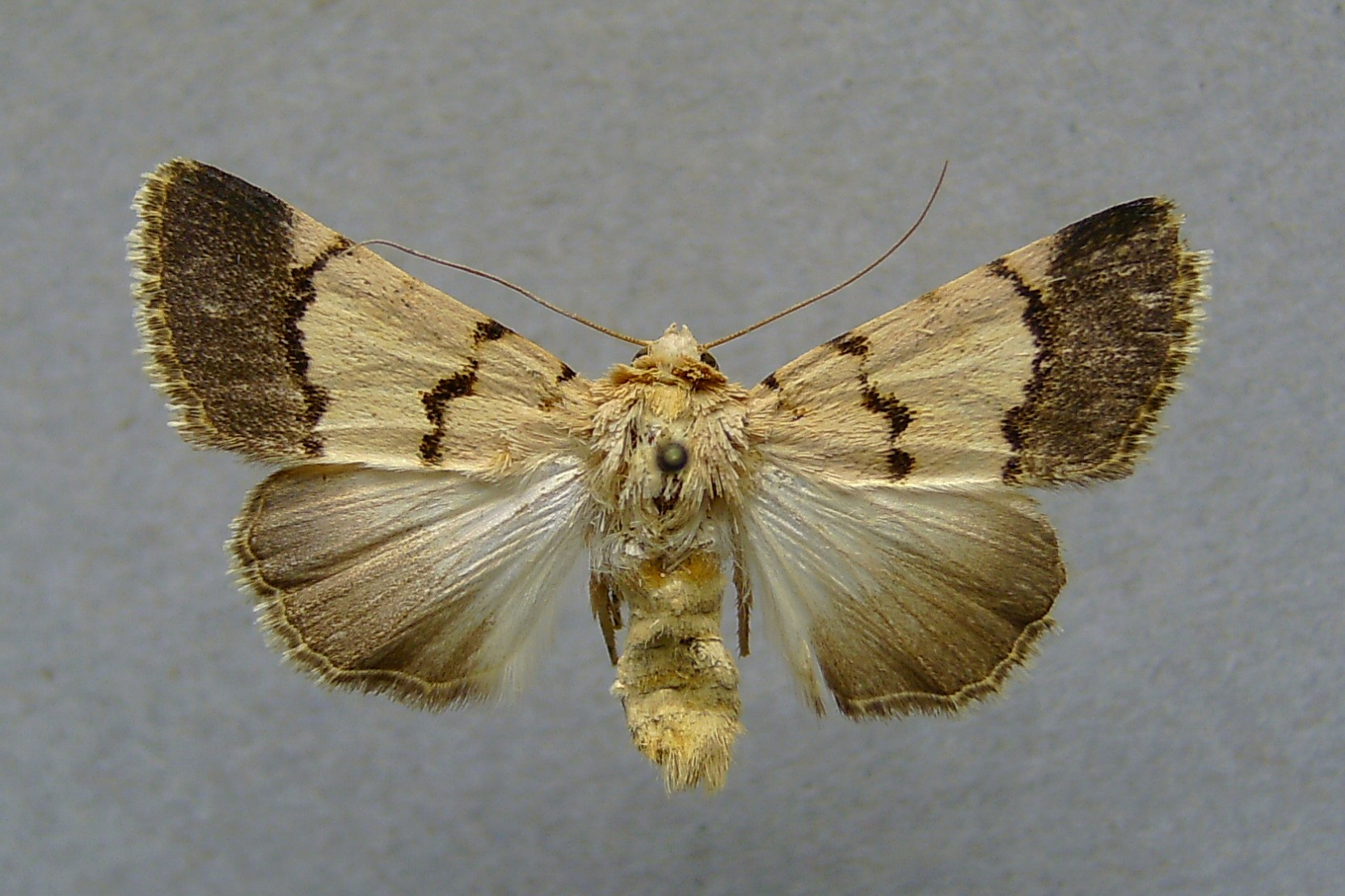

Scientific classification
- Domain: Eukaryota
- Kingdom: Animalia
- Phylum: Arthropoda
- Class: Insecta
- Order: Lepidoptera
- Superfamily: Noctuoidea
- Family: Noctuidae
- Genus: Dichagyris
- Species: D. imperator

Binomial name
- Dichagyris imperator (Bang-Haas, 1912)

Synonyms
- Agrotis imperator A. Bang-Haas, 1912; Agrotis alcarriensis Calle & Agenjo, 1981

= Dichagyris imperator =

Species of moth

Dichagyris imperator is a moth of the family Noctuidae. It is found in all eremic parts of North Africa and the Arabian Peninsula and in southern Spain.

Adults are on wing from March to May in Israel and from April to July and again in August in northwest Africa. There is one generation per year.

The larvae feed on Zygophyllum and probably other low growing plants.
