= Dichagyris triphaenoides =

Scientific classification
- Domain: Eukaryota
- Kingdom: Animalia
- Phylum: Arthropoda
- Class: Insecta
- Order: Lepidoptera
- Superfamily: Noctuoidea
- Family: Noctuidae
- Genus: Dichagyris
- Species: D. triphaenoides

Binomial name
- Dichagyris triphaenoides (Dyar, 1912)

Species of moth

Dichagyris triphaenoides is a species of cutworm or dart moth in the family Noctuidae.

The MONA or Hodges number for Dichagyris triphaenoides is 10667.
