= Dichagyris leucomelas =

Scientific classification
- Kingdom: Animalia
- Phylum: Arthropoda
- Class: Insecta
- Order: Lepidoptera
- Superfamily: Noctuoidea
- Family: Noctuidae
- Genus: Dichagyris
- Species: D. leucomelas

Binomial name
- Dichagyris leucomelas Brandt, 1941

Species of moth

Dichagyris leucomelas is a moth of the family Noctuidae. It is widespread in the Near East and Middle East, from Kirghizia, Uzbekistan, Tajikistan to Afghanistan, north Pakistan, north India and Iran.

Adults are on wing from May to July. There is only one generation per year.
