= Dichagyris salina =

Scientific classification
- Domain: Eukaryota
- Kingdom: Animalia
- Phylum: Arthropoda
- Class: Insecta
- Order: Lepidoptera
- Superfamily: Noctuoidea
- Family: Noctuidae
- Genus: Dichagyris
- Species: D. salina

Binomial name
- Dichagyris salina (Barnes, 1904)

Species of moth

Dichagyris salina is a species of cutworm or dart moth in the family Noctuidae. It was first described by William Barnes in 1904, and it is found in North America.

The MONA or Hodges number for Dichagyris salina is 10873.
