= Joel Sartore =

American photographer

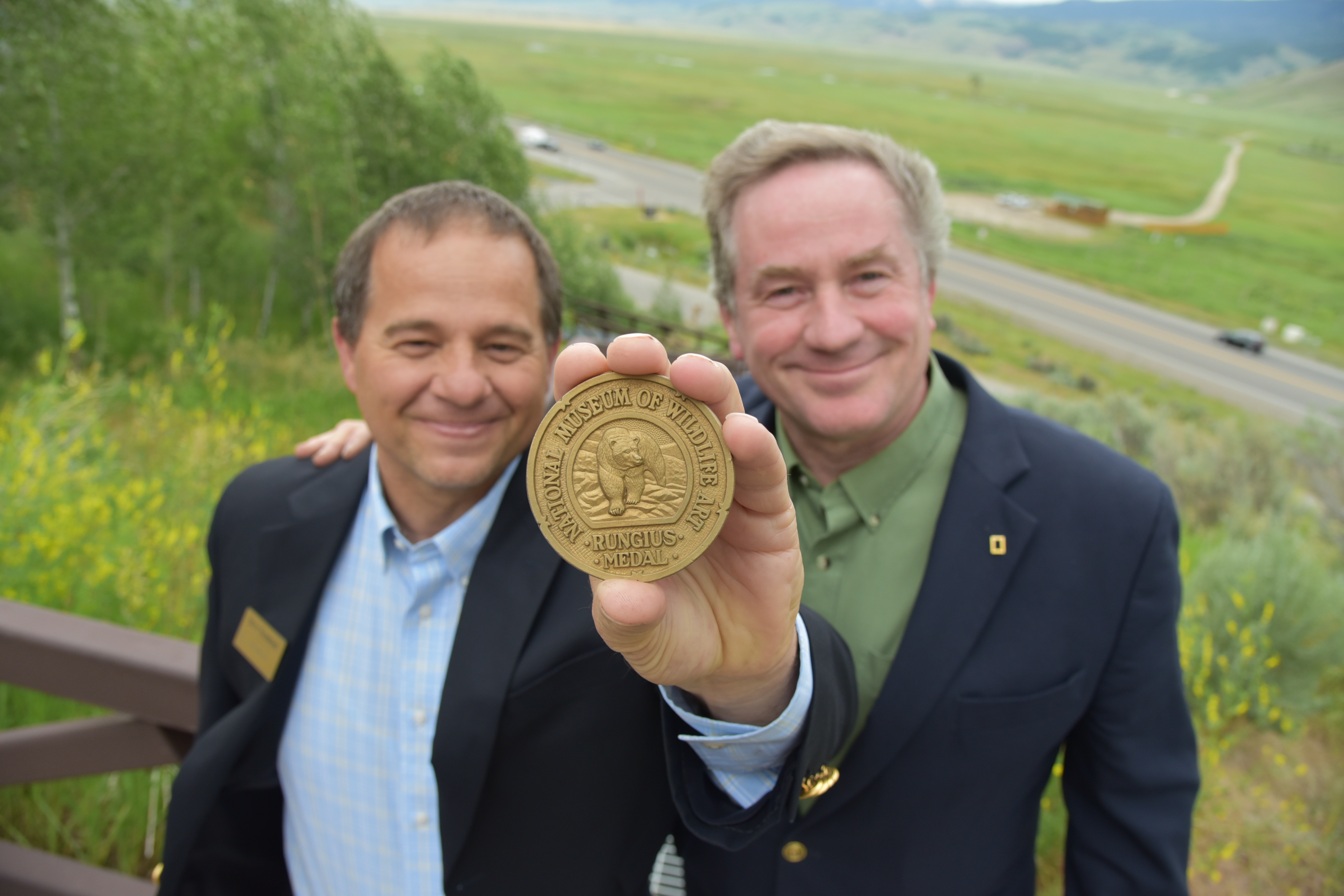
- Joel Sartore (right) as he is awarded the Rungius Medal at the National Museum of Wildlife Art
- Occupations: Photographer, Public Speaker, Author, Teacher
- Website: www.joelsartore.com

Joel Sartore is an American photographer focusing on conservation, speaker, author, teacher, and long-time contributor to National Geographic magazine. He is the head of The Photo Ark, a 25-year project to document the approximately 12,000 species living in the world's zoos and wildlife sanctuaries.

== Life and work ==
Sartore graduated from the University of Nebraska–Lincoln with a degree in journalism. His interest in nature started in childhood when he learned about the very last passenger pigeon from one of his mother's Time-Life picture books. He has since been in close contact with a wide variety of species including wolves, grizzlies, musk oxen, lions, elephants and polar bears. His first National Geographic assignments introduced him to nature photography, and also allowed him to see human impact on the environment first-hand.

In addition to the work he has done for National Geographic, Sartore has contributed to Audubon Magazine, GEO, Time, Life, Newsweek, Sports Illustrated and numerous book projects. Sartore and his work have been the subjects of several national broadcasts including National Geographic's Explorer, the NBC Nightly News, NPR's Weekend Edition, an hour-long PBS documentary, At Close Range, he has been a contributor on the CBS Sunday Morning Show with Charles Osgood. In 2015, he had an appearance in the film Racing Extinction where he photographed the very last Rabb's fringe-limbed treefrog.

Most recently, Sartore and The Photo Ark were the subjects of a three-part series which premiered on PBS titled: Rare: "Creatures of the Photo Ark".

In 2018, Sartore was presented with the Rolex National Geographic Explorer of the Year award.

In 2021 Sartore was inducted into the International Photography Hall of Fame and Museum and he received the Ansel Adams Award for Conservation Photography from the Sierra Club.

In 2022, the U.S. Postal Service announced a pane of 20 stamps presenting a photographic portfolio of 20 representative endangered animal species from Sartore's Photo Ark project.

Sartore is a fellow of the International League of Conservation Photographers (ILCP), and resides in Lincoln, Nebraska with his wife and children.

=== The Photo Ark ===
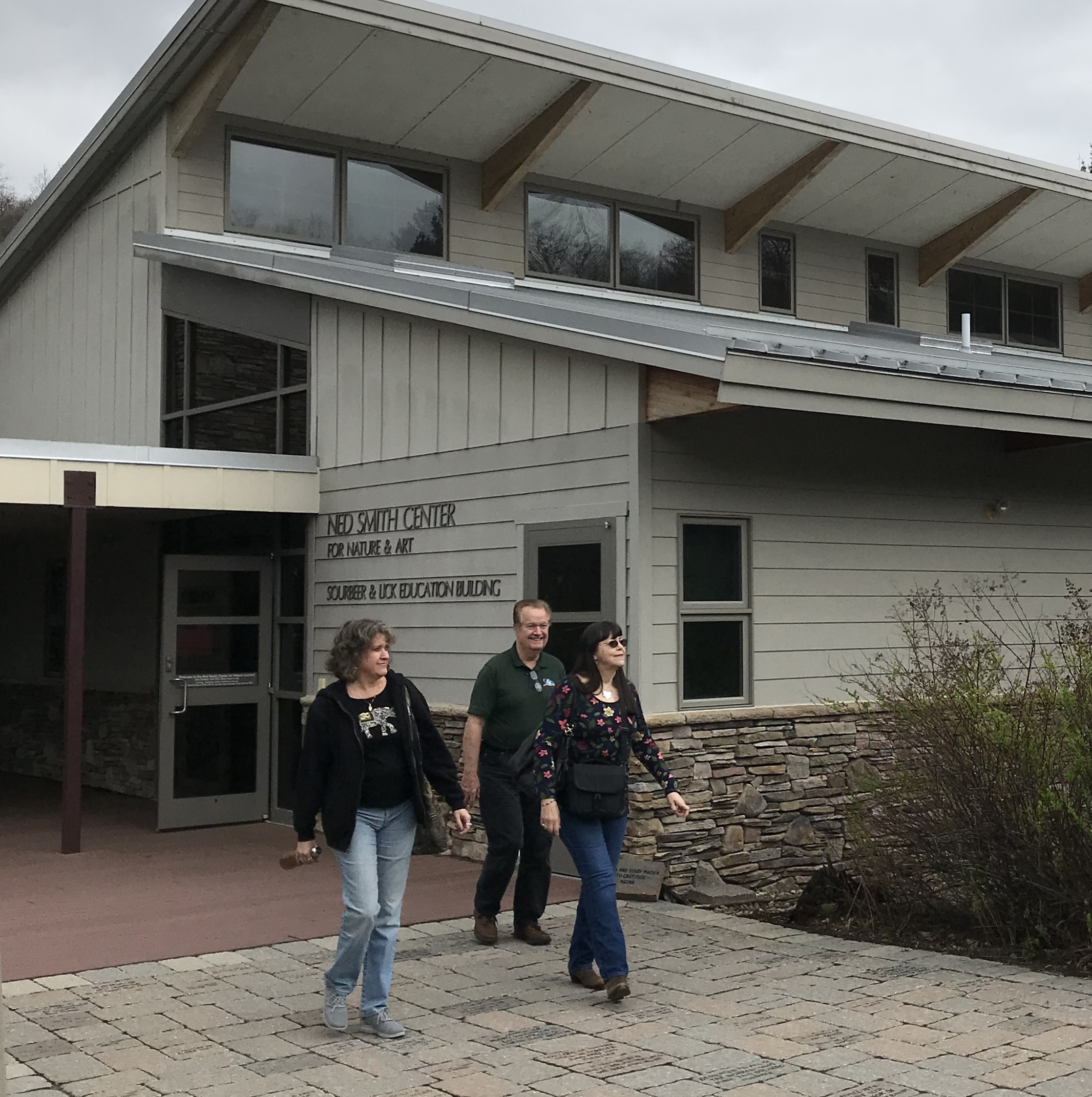
The Ned Smith Center for Nature and Art exhibiting the Photo Ark

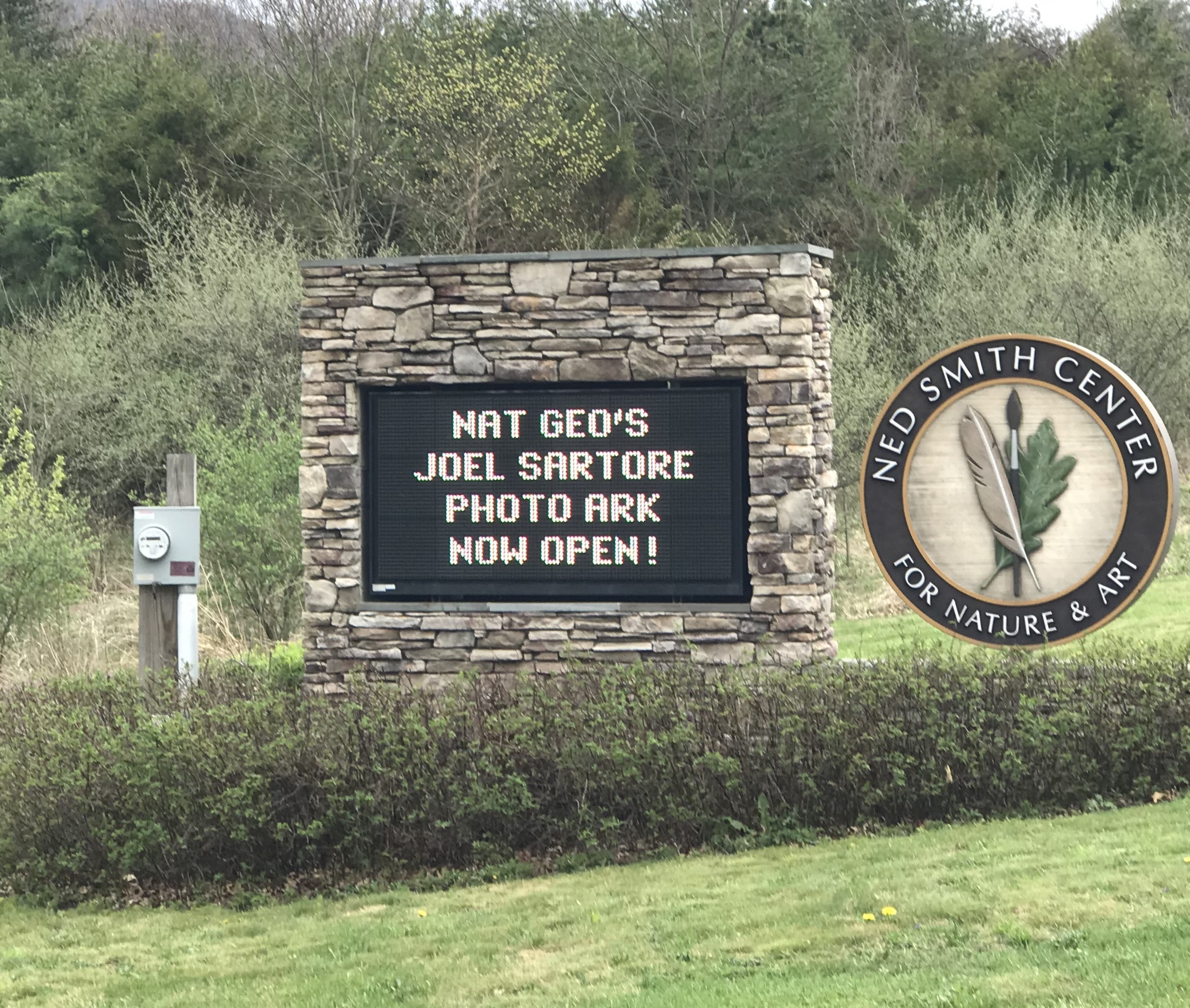
Photo Ark on exhibit in Pennsylvania

The Photo Ark is a National Geographic project led by Sartore. It has the goal of photographing all species living in zoos and wildlife sanctuaries around the globe. The results have been documented in a series of books and in a 2017 PBS TV miniseries which was released to home video.

To spread awareness of this undertaking, a selection of photographs from The Photo Ark has been exhibited in various locations around the world in a variety of diverse locations such as the Auditorium Parco della Musica in Rome, Italy, and the Ned Smith Center for Nature and Art Amphitheater in Millersburg, Pennsylvania. Images from the project were also projected on global landmark buildings such as St. Peter's Basilica in the Vatican and the Empire State Building in New York.

Regarding the scope of the project, Sartore has said "The logistics of pulling off a project of this scope is numbing at times. The travel, the long hours, the setup and teardown of our mobile photo studio… it wears me down just thinking about it." In August 2024, the 16,000th species was photographed for the Photo Ark.

== Publications ==
- The Company We Keep: America's Endangered Species, 1995, National Geographic Society (1997 reprint), ISBN 0-7922-3310-7, with Douglas H. Chadwick
- Nebraska: Under a Big Red Sky, 1999, Nebraska Book Company (2006 Reprint, University of Nebraska Press), ISBN 0-9648992-6-4
- Photographing Your Family, 2008, National Geographic, ISBN 1-4262-0218-0, with John Healey
- Rare: Portraits of America's Endangered Species, 2010, Focal Point (National Geographic), ISBN 1-4262-0575-9
- Let's Be Reasonable, 2011, University of Nebraska Press, ISBN 0-8032-3506-2
- Fundamentals of Photography, 2012, Teaching Co.
- Fundamentals of Photography II, 2015, Teaching Co.
- The Photo Ark: One Man's Quest to Document the World's Animals, 2017, ISBN 9781426217777
- Rare: Creatures of the Photo Ark, PBS mini-series 2017
- Birds Of The Photo Ark, 2018, ISBN 978-1426218989
- The Photo Ark Vanishing: The World's Most Vulnerable Animals (2019) ISBN 978-1426220593
- Photo Ark Wonders: Celebrating Diversity in the Animal Kingdom (2021)
- National Geographic Photo Ark Insects: Butterflies, Bees, and Kindred Creatures, 2023 ISBN 978-1426223112
