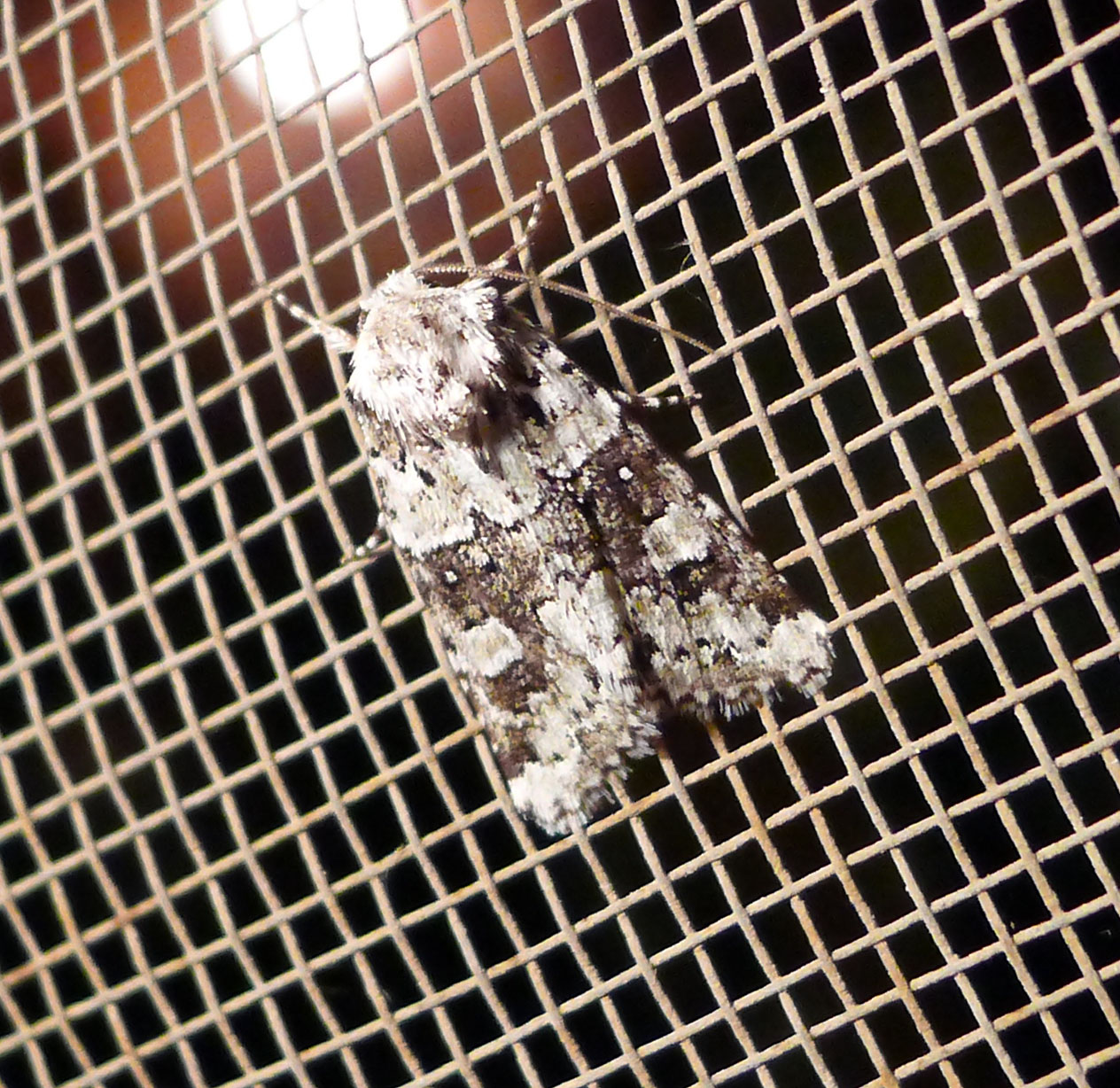

Scientific classification
- Domain: Eukaryota
- Kingdom: Animalia
- Phylum: Arthropoda
- Class: Insecta
- Order: Lepidoptera
- Superfamily: Noctuoidea
- Family: Noctuidae
- Subfamily: Noctuinae
- Tribe: Noctuini
- Genus: Dichagyris
- Species: D. polycala

Binomial name
- Dichagyris polycala Lafontaine, 2004

= Dichagyris polycala =

Species of moth

Dichagyris polycala is a species of cutworm or dart moth in the family Noctuidae. It is found in North America.

The MONA or Hodges number for Dichagyris polycala is 10875.
