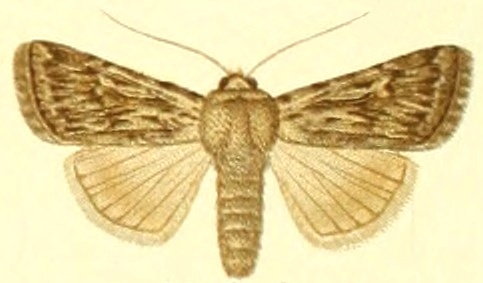
- Female
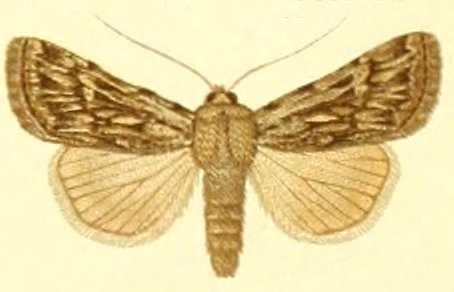
- Male

Scientific classification
- Kingdom: Animalia
- Phylum: Arthropoda
- Class: Insecta
- Order: Lepidoptera
- Superfamily: Noctuoidea
- Family: Noctuidae
- Genus: Dichagyris
- Species: D. multicuspis

Binomial name
- Dichagyris multicuspis (Eversmann, 1852)

Synonyms
- Hadena multicuspis Eversmann, 1852; Dichagyris spinosa Staudinger, 1877; Euxoa issykula; Euxoa multicuspis (Eversmann, 1852); Agrotis aequicuspis Staudinger, 1900; Euxoa aequicuspis; Yigoga multicuspis (Eversmann, 1852)

= Dichagyris multicuspis =

Species of moth

Dichagyris multicuspis is a moth of the family Noctuidae. It is found southern Urals, Armenia, central Asia, Turkestan, the Tien-Shan Mountains, Korla, Turkey, Afghanistan, western China and Mongolia.

The wingspan is about 37 mm.

== Subspecies ==
- Dichagyris multicuspis multicuspis
- Dichagyris multicuspis aequicuspis
