= Dichagyris neoclivis =

Scientific classification
- Domain: Eukaryota
- Kingdom: Animalia
- Phylum: Arthropoda
- Class: Insecta
- Order: Lepidoptera
- Superfamily: Noctuoidea
- Family: Noctuidae
- Genus: Dichagyris
- Species: D. neoclivis

Binomial name
- Dichagyris neoclivis (Barnes & Benjamin, 1924)

Species of moth

Dichagyris neoclivis is a species of cutworm or dart moth in the family Noctuidae. It was described by William Barnes and Foster Hendrickson Benjamin in 1924 and is found in North America.

The MONA or Hodges number for Dichagyris neoclivis is 10872.
