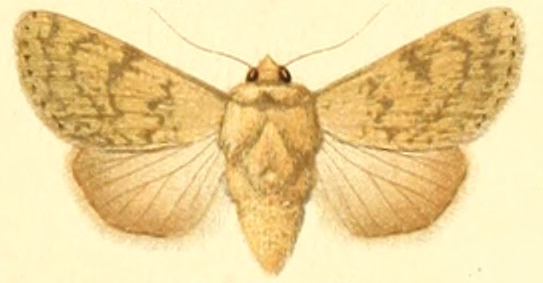

Scientific classification
- Kingdom: Animalia
- Phylum: Arthropoda
- Clade: Pancrustacea
- Class: Insecta
- Order: Lepidoptera
- Superfamily: Noctuoidea
- Family: Noctuidae
- Genus: Dichagyris
- Species: D. constanti

Binomial name
- Dichagyris constanti (Millière, 1860)

Synonyms
- Agrotis constanti Millière, 1860; Euxoa constanti (Millière, 1860); Dichagyris constanti f. pallida Schawerda, 1928; Dichagyris constanti f. rosescens Schawerda, 1928; Dichagyris clarescens Fernández, 1929; Dichagyris constanti f. schawerdae Agenjo, 1941; Dichagyris dumezi Lucas, 1955; Dichagyris rosinana Lucas, 1955

= Dichagyris constanti =

Species of moth

Dichagyris constanti is a moth of the family Noctuidae. It is found in Algeria, Morocco, south-western Europe, southern France, and northern Italy. Warren (1914) states E. constanti Mill. (12 f) Forewing pale yellow, dusted with darker especially in median area; the lines fine; the subterminal punctiform; stigmata very faint; hindwing white, with the fringe and margin yellowish. Recorded only from the Ardeche, France.

The larvae feed on various herbaceous plants.
