= Dichagyris melanuroides =

Scientific classification
- Domain: Eukaryota
- Kingdom: Animalia
- Phylum: Arthropoda
- Class: Insecta
- Order: Lepidoptera
- Superfamily: Noctuoidea
- Family: Noctuidae
- Genus: Dichagyris
- Species: D. melanuroides

Binomial name
- Dichagyris melanuroides Kozhantshikov, 1930

Species of moth

Dichagyris melanuroides is a moth of the family Noctuidae. It is widespread in the Near East and Middle East, from Kirghizia, Uzbekistan, Tajikistan to Afghanistan, north Pakistan, north India and Iran.

Adults are on wing in July. There is one generation per year.
