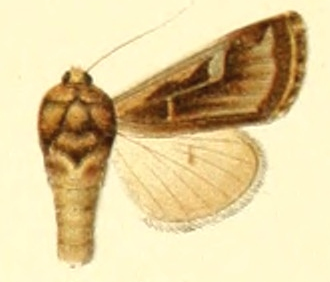

Scientific classification
- Domain: Eukaryota
- Kingdom: Animalia
- Phylum: Arthropoda
- Class: Insecta
- Order: Lepidoptera
- Superfamily: Noctuoidea
- Family: Noctuidae
- Genus: Albocosta
- Species: A. lasciva

Binomial name
- Albocosta lasciva (Staudinger, 1888)

Synonyms
- Agrotis lasciva Staudinger 1888; Ochropleura lasciva (Staudinger 1888); Dichagyris lasciva (Staudinger, 1888)

= Albocosta lasciva =

Species of moth

Albocosta lasciva is a moth of the family Noctuidae. It is found in the Alay Mountains, Uzbekistan and Tajikistan.
