= Dichagyris elbursica =

Scientific classification
- Domain: Eukaryota
- Kingdom: Animalia
- Phylum: Arthropoda
- Class: Insecta
- Order: Lepidoptera
- Superfamily: Noctuoidea
- Family: Noctuidae
- Genus: Dichagyris
- Species: D. elbursica

Binomial name
- Dichagyris elbursica (Draudt, 1937)

Species of moth

Dichagyris elbursica is a moth of the family Noctuidae. It is widespread in almost all mountain systems on higher altitudes of the Near East and Middle East, central Asia and Afghanistan.

Adults are on wing from June to August. There is one generation per year.
