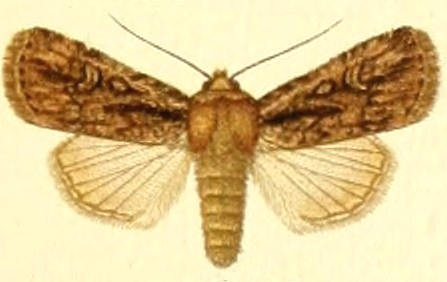

Scientific classification
- Domain: Eukaryota
- Kingdom: Animalia
- Phylum: Arthropoda
- Class: Insecta
- Order: Lepidoptera
- Superfamily: Noctuoidea
- Family: Noctuidae
- Genus: Dichagyris
- Species: D. signifera

Binomial name
- Dichagyris signifera (Denis & Schiffermüller, 1775)

Synonyms
- Noctua signifera Denis & Schiffermüller, 1775; Euxoa signifera (Denis & Schiffermüller, 1775); Ogygia signifera (Denis & Schiffermüller, 1775); Yigoga signifera (Denis & Schiffermüller, 1775)

= Dichagyris signifera =

Species of moth

Dichagyris signifera is a moth of the family Noctuidae. It is found from Spain and France, east through central and southern Europe (including Italy and Greece) to Latvia and Russia.

== Description ==
The wingspan is 34–40 mm. Warren (1914) states E. signifera F. (7 g). Forewing brownish grey with a reddish tinge; the costal area, the median and submedian veins speckled pale grey and black; the veinlets blackish; a black streak from base below cell: stigmata as in turbans [error],Dichagyris disturbans but the reniform broader and not angled inwards; marginal area more prominently streaked with dark; hindwing whitish, with a fuscous tinge towards margin, especially in the female. Widely spread, occurring in the Alps of France and Switzerland, in Germany, Austria, Hungary and Russia, and throughout W. Asia; Armenia, Asia Minor, Syria, Persia, Turkestan and W. Siberia; — in the ab. improcera Stgr. [Dichagyris orientis (Alphéraky, 1882)](7g), which is a duller insect, more like turbans [Dichagyris disturbans (Püngeler, 1914)], the markings are all obscured; orientis Alph.Dichagyris orientis (7g) is much paler, uniform smooth ochreous grey, with the black basal streak and costal spots prominent; both these aberrations are confined to W. Asia.

== Biology ==
The larvae feed on Echium, Poa and Plantago species.
