= Dichagyris grandipennis =

Scientific classification
- Kingdom: Animalia
- Phylum: Arthropoda
- Class: Insecta
- Order: Lepidoptera
- Superfamily: Noctuoidea
- Family: Noctuidae
- Genus: Dichagyris
- Species: D. grandipennis

Binomial name
- Dichagyris grandipennis (Grote, 1883)

Species of moth

Dichagyris grandipennis is a species of cutworm or dart moth in the family Noctuidae.

The MONA or Hodges number for Dichagyris grandipennis is 10890.
