= Dichagyris arabella =

Scientific classification
- Kingdom: Animalia
- Phylum: Arthropoda
- Class: Insecta
- Order: Lepidoptera
- Superfamily: Noctuoidea
- Family: Noctuidae
- Genus: Dichagyris
- Species: D. arabella

Binomial name
- Dichagyris arabella (Dyar, 1901)

Species of moth

Dichagyris arabella is a species of cutworm or dart moth in the family Noctuidae.

The MONA or Hodges number for Dichagyris arabella is 10873.1.
