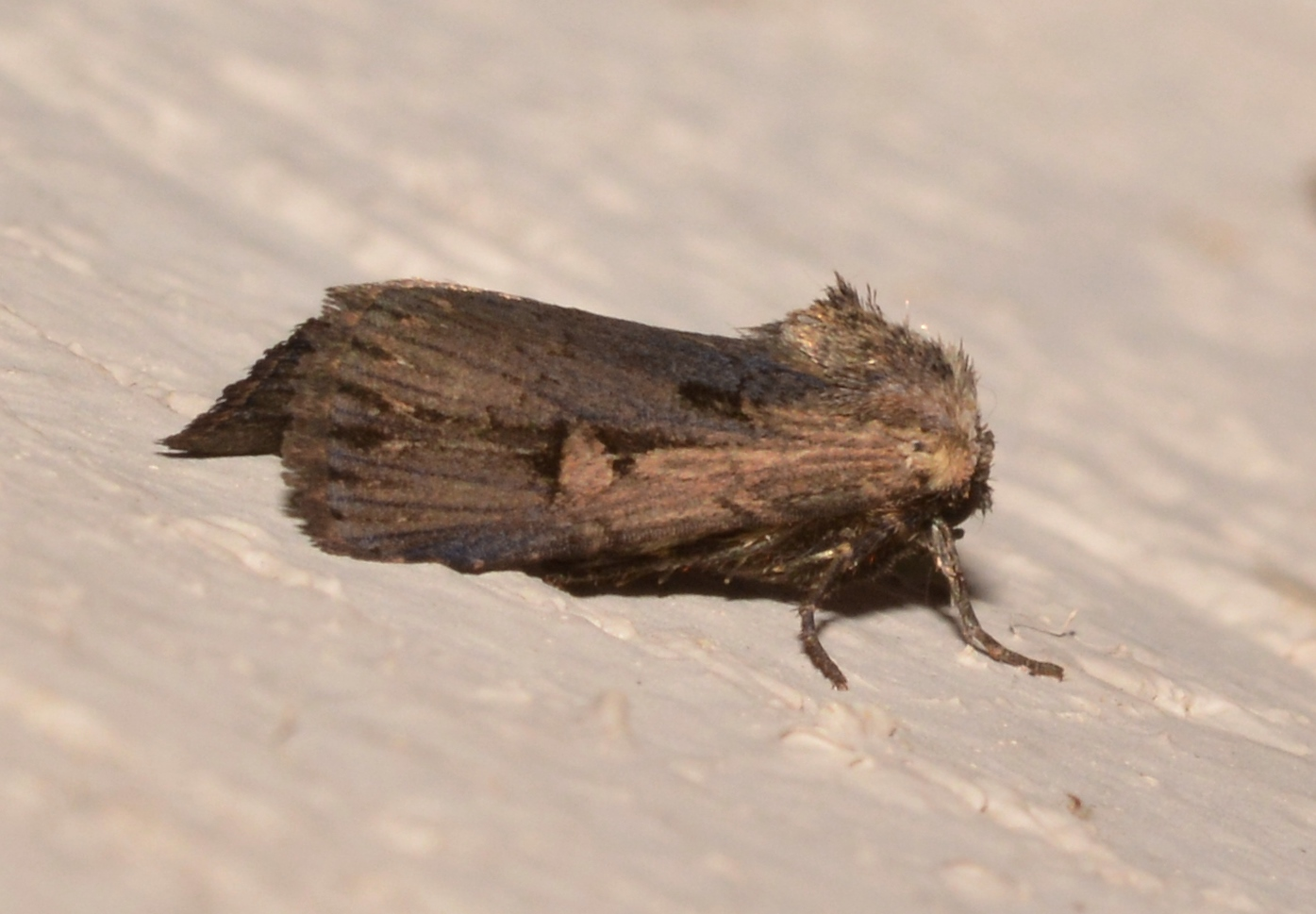

Scientific classification
- Domain: Eukaryota
- Kingdom: Animalia
- Phylum: Arthropoda
- Class: Insecta
- Order: Lepidoptera
- Superfamily: Noctuoidea
- Family: Noctuidae
- Genus: Dichagyris
- Species: D. acclivis

Binomial name
- Dichagyris acclivis (Morrison, 1875)

Synonyms
- Richia acclivis Morrison, 1875

= Dichagyris acclivis =

Species of moth

Dichagyris acclivis is a moth of the family Noctuidae. It is found from southern Ontario and southern Massachusetts south to eastern Tennessee and western North Carolina, west to Illinois, Missouri, and Kansas and south to east central Texas. It is listed as a species of special concern in Connecticut.

The wingspan is about 32 mm. Adults are on wing from August to September.

The larvae feed on seeds of Panicum virgatum.
