= Dichagyris cataclivis =

Scientific classification
- Kingdom: Animalia
- Phylum: Arthropoda
- Class: Insecta
- Order: Lepidoptera
- Superfamily: Noctuoidea
- Family: Noctuidae
- Genus: Dichagyris
- Species: D. cataclivis

Binomial name
- Dichagyris cataclivis (Dyar, 1910)

Species of moth

Dichagyris cataclivis is a species of cutworm or dart moth in the family Noctuidae. It is found in North America.

The MONA or Hodges number for Dichagyris cataclivis is 10870.1.
