= Dichagyris grotei =

Scientific classification
- Domain: Eukaryota
- Kingdom: Animalia
- Phylum: Arthropoda
- Class: Insecta
- Order: Lepidoptera
- Superfamily: Noctuoidea
- Family: Noctuidae
- Subfamily: Noctuinae
- Tribe: Noctuini
- Genus: Dichagyris
- Species: D. grotei

Binomial name
- Dichagyris grotei (Franclemont & Todd, 1983)

Species of moth

Dichagyris grotei is a species of cutworm or dart moth in the family Noctuidae.

The MONA or Hodges number for Dichagyris grotei is 10869.
