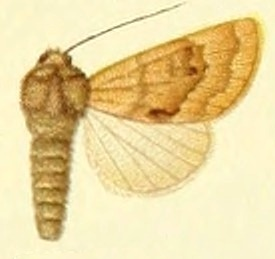

Scientific classification
- Domain: Eukaryota
- Kingdom: Animalia
- Phylum: Arthropoda
- Class: Insecta
- Order: Lepidoptera
- Superfamily: Noctuoidea
- Family: Noctuidae
- Genus: Dichagyris
- Species: D. amoena

Binomial name
- Dichagyris amoena Staudinger, 1892

Synonyms
- Euxoa amoena

= Dichagyris amoena =

Species of moth

Dichagyris amoena is a moth of the family Noctuidae. It is found in Turkey and Israel.

Adults are on wing in October. There is one generation per year.
