= Dichagyris terminicincta =

Scientific classification
- Kingdom: Animalia
- Phylum: Arthropoda
- Class: Insecta
- Order: Lepidoptera
- Superfamily: Noctuoidea
- Family: Noctuidae
- Genus: Dichagyris
- Species: D. terminicincta

Binomial name
- Dichagyris terminicincta (Corti, 1933)

Species of moth

Dichagyris terminicincta is a moth of the family Noctuidae. It is found in the Near East and Middle East, more specifically Lebanon, Israel, Turkey, Iran and Afghanistan.

Adults are on wing from July to August. There is one generation per year.
