= Dichagyris pfeifferi =

Scientific classification
- Kingdom: Animalia
- Phylum: Arthropoda
- Class: Insecta
- Order: Lepidoptera
- Superfamily: Noctuoidea
- Family: Noctuidae
- Genus: Dichagyris
- Species: D. pfeifferi

Binomial name
- Dichagyris pfeifferi (Corti & Draudt, 1933)

Species of moth

Dichagyris pfeifferi is a moth of the family Noctuidae. It is found in eastern and south-eastern Turkey, Iran and Israel.

Adults are on wing from August to October. There is one generation per year.
