= Dichagyris socorro =

Scientific classification
- Domain: Eukaryota
- Kingdom: Animalia
- Phylum: Arthropoda
- Class: Insecta
- Order: Lepidoptera
- Superfamily: Noctuoidea
- Family: Noctuidae
- Genus: Dichagyris
- Species: D. socorro

Binomial name
- Dichagyris socorro (Barnes, 1904)

Synonyms
- Dichagyris pampolycala (Dyar, 1912)

Species of moth

Dichagyris socorro is a species of cutworm or dart moth in the family Noctuidae. It was first described by William Barnes in 1904 and it is found in North America.

The MONA or Hodges number for Dichagyris socorro is 10874.
