= Dichagyris proclivis =

Scientific classification
- Domain: Eukaryota
- Kingdom: Animalia
- Phylum: Arthropoda
- Class: Insecta
- Order: Lepidoptera
- Superfamily: Noctuoidea
- Family: Noctuidae
- Subfamily: Noctuinae
- Tribe: Noctuini
- Genus: Dichagyris
- Species: D. proclivis

Binomial name
- Dichagyris proclivis (Smith, 1888)

Species of moth

Dichagyris proclivis is a species of cutworm or dart moth in the family Noctuidae.

The MONA or Hodges number for Dichagyris proclivis is 10871.
