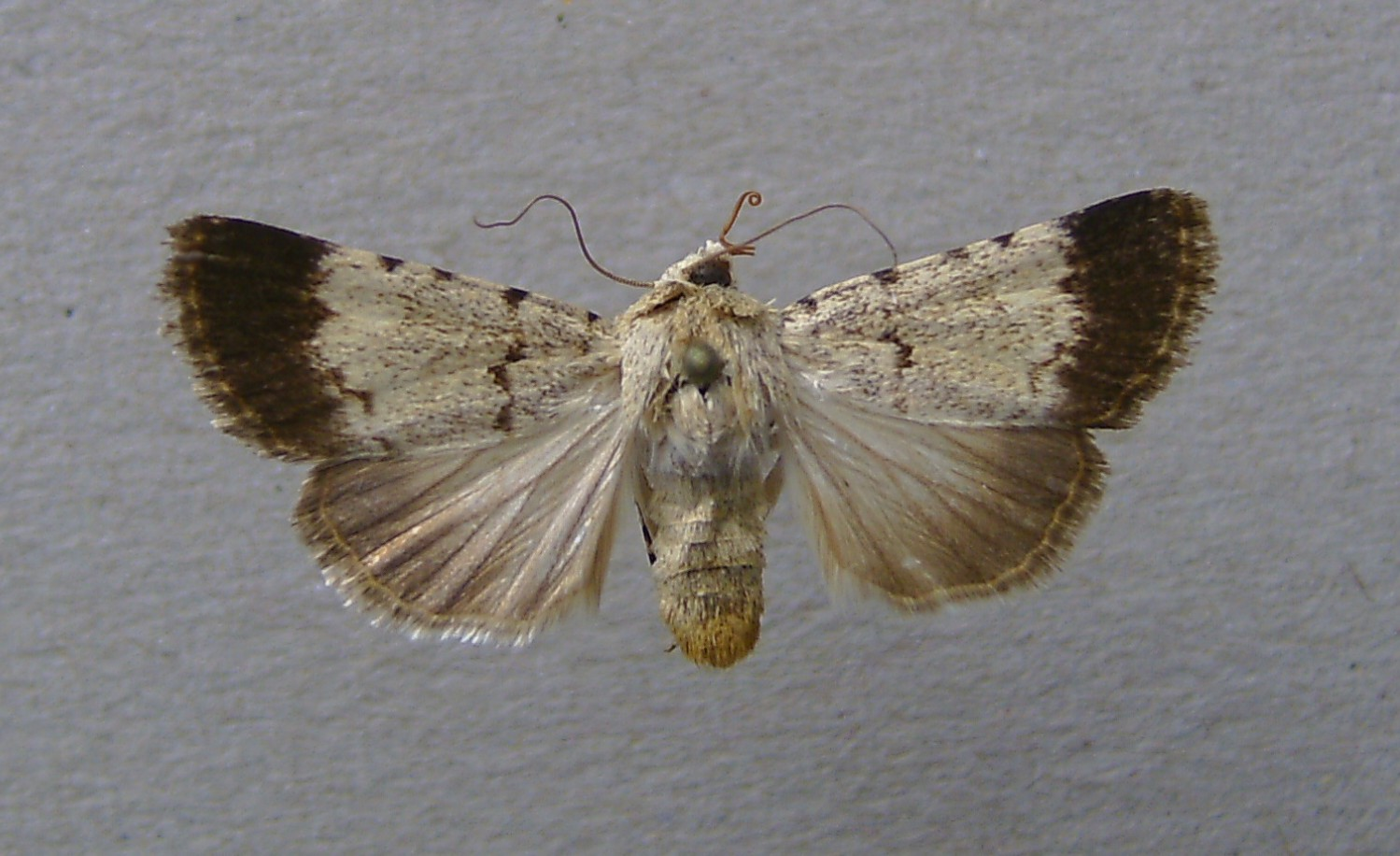

Scientific classification
- Domain: Eukaryota
- Kingdom: Animalia
- Phylum: Arthropoda
- Class: Insecta
- Order: Lepidoptera
- Superfamily: Noctuoidea
- Family: Noctuidae
- Genus: Dichagyris
- Species: D. melanura

Binomial name
- Dichagyris melanura (Kollar, 1846)

Synonyms
- Agrotis melanura Kollar, 1846

= Dichagyris melanura =

Species of moth

Dichagyris melanura is a moth of the family Noctuidae. It is found from south-eastern Europe to Turkey, the Caucasus region, north Iran, Israel, Syria and Jordan.

Adults are on wing from May to July. There is one generation per year.

== Subspecies ==
- Dichagyris melanura melanura (Yugoslavia)
- Dichagyris melanura albida (the shores of Black Sea in Romania and Bulgaria))
- Dichagyris melanura dufayi (Greece)
- Dichagyris melanura vera (Turkestan, Caucasus, Armenia, Turkey, Syria, Lebanon, Iraq, Iran)
- Dichagyris melanura roseotincta (Israel)
