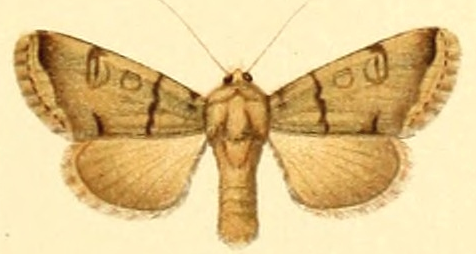

Scientific classification
- Kingdom: Animalia
- Phylum: Arthropoda
- Class: Insecta
- Order: Lepidoptera
- Superfamily: Noctuoidea
- Family: Noctuidae
- Genus: Dichagyris
- Species: D. singularis

Binomial name
- Dichagyris singularis (Staudinger, 1892)

Synonyms
- Euxoa singularis

= Dichagyris singularis =

Species of moth

Dichagyris singularis is a moth of the family Noctuidae. It is found from Turkmenistan to south-eastern Turkey, parts of the Middle East, Jordan, Israel, Iran and Afghanistan.

Adults are on wing from September to January. There is one generation per year.

The larvae feed at night on low growing plants.

== Subspecies ==
- Dichagyris singularis singularis
- Dichagyris singularis mesopotamica (Israel)
