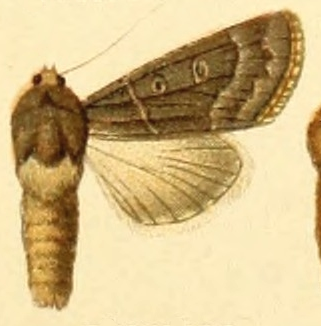

Scientific classification
- Domain: Eukaryota
- Kingdom: Animalia
- Phylum: Arthropoda
- Class: Insecta
- Order: Lepidoptera
- Superfamily: Noctuoidea
- Family: Noctuidae
- Genus: Dichagyris
- Species: D. plumbea

Binomial name
- Dichagyris plumbea (Alpheraky, 1887)

Synonyms
- Rhyacia plumbea

= Dichagyris plumbea =

Species of moth

Dichagyris plumbea is a moth of the family Noctuidae. It is found in the Southern Siberian Mountains and Kyrgyzstan.
