= Dichagyris rubidior =

Scientific classification
- Domain: Eukaryota
- Kingdom: Animalia
- Phylum: Arthropoda
- Class: Insecta
- Order: Lepidoptera
- Superfamily: Noctuoidea
- Family: Noctuidae
- Genus: Dichagyris
- Species: D. rubidior

Binomial name
- Dichagyris rubidior (Corti, 1933)

Species of moth

Dichagyris rubidior is a moth of the family Noctuidae. It is endemic to the mountains of Lebanon and the upper part of Mount Hermon in the Golan Heights.

Adults are on wing from June to August. There is one generation per year.
