= Dichagyris madida =

Scientific classification
- Kingdom: Animalia
- Phylum: Arthropoda
- Class: Insecta
- Order: Lepidoptera
- Superfamily: Noctuoidea
- Family: Noctuidae
- Genus: Dichagyris
- Species: D. madida

Binomial name
- Dichagyris madida (Guenée, 1852)

Synonyms
- Dichagyris hahama (Dyar, 1919)

Species of moth

Dichagyris madida is a species of cutworm or dart moth in the family Noctuidae.

The MONA or Hodges number for Dichagyris madida is 10885.
