= Dichagyris lobato =

Scientific classification
- Domain: Eukaryota
- Kingdom: Animalia
- Phylum: Arthropoda
- Class: Insecta
- Order: Lepidoptera
- Superfamily: Noctuoidea
- Family: Noctuidae
- Genus: Dichagyris
- Species: D. lobato

Binomial name
- Dichagyris lobato (Barnes, 1904)

Species of moth

Dichagyris lobato is a species of cutworm or dart moth in the family Noctuidae. It was first described by William Barnes in 1904 and it is found in North America.

The MONA or Hodges number for Dichagyris lobato is 10884.
