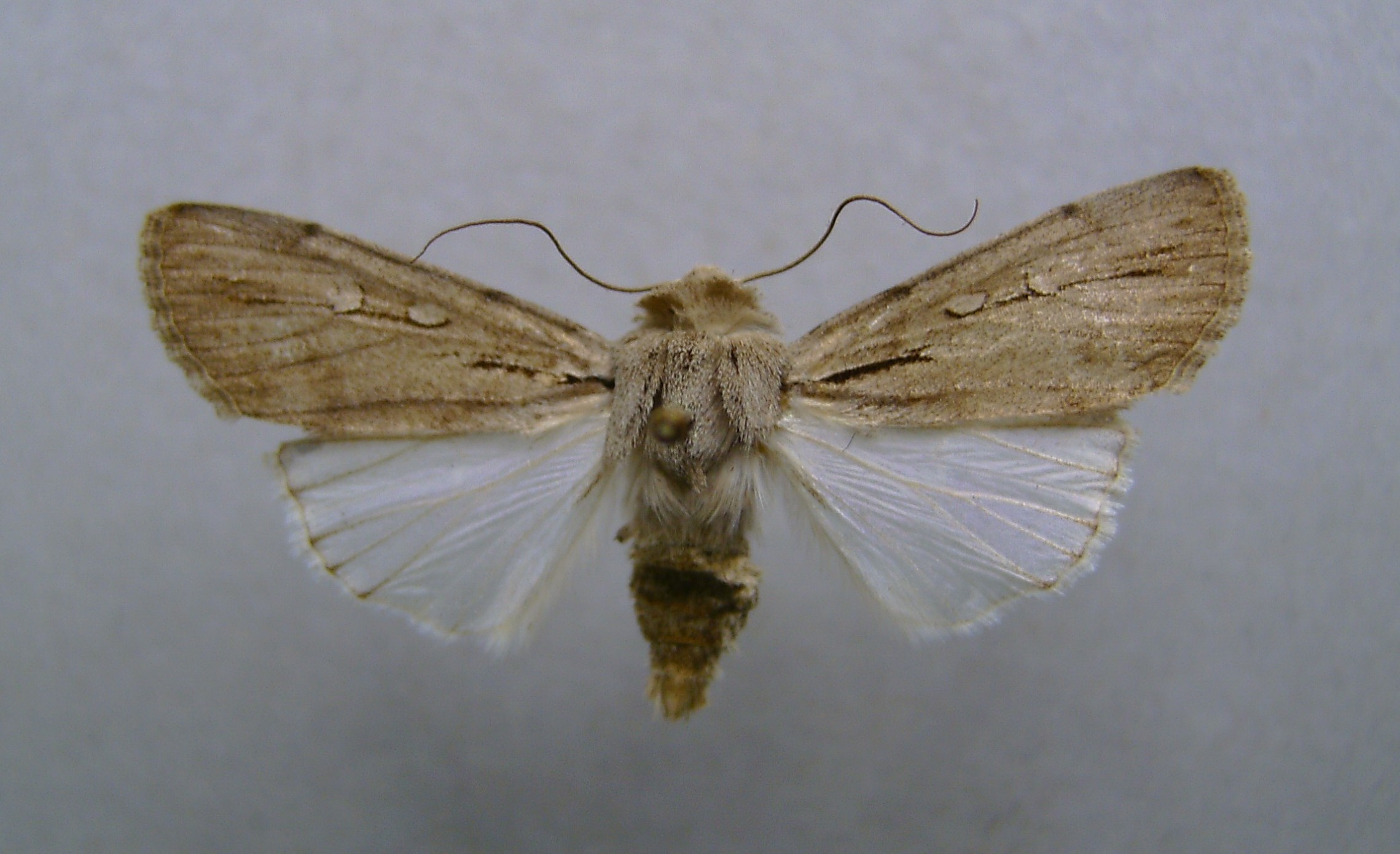

Scientific classification
- Kingdom: Animalia
- Phylum: Arthropoda
- Class: Insecta
- Order: Lepidoptera
- Superfamily: Noctuoidea
- Family: Noctuidae
- Genus: Dichagyris
- Species: D. candelisequa

Binomial name
- Dichagyris candelisequa (Denis & Schiffermüller, 1775)

Synonyms
- Noctua candelisequa Denis & Schiffermüller, 1775

= Dichagyris candelisequa =

Species of moth

Dichagyris candelisequa is a moth of the family Noctuidae. It is found from central Europe and southern Siberia to northern Iran, Afghanistan, Turkey and northern Africa.

The wingspan is 40–50 mm. Adults are on wing from May to July. There is one generation per year.

The larvae feed on Poaceae species and other herbaceous plants.

== Subspecies ==
- Dichagyris candelisequa candelisequa
- Dichagyris candelisequa achaemenidica (Israel)
- Dichagyris candelisequa defasciata
