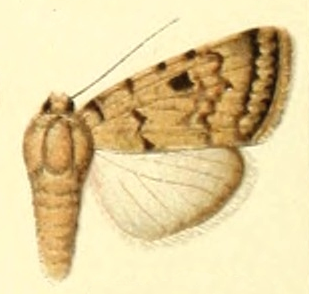

Scientific classification
- Domain: Eukaryota
- Kingdom: Animalia
- Phylum: Arthropoda
- Class: Insecta
- Order: Lepidoptera
- Superfamily: Noctuoidea
- Family: Noctuidae
- Genus: Dichagyris
- Species: D. eremicola

Binomial name
- Dichagyris eremicola (Standfuss, 1888)

Synonyms
- Agrotis eremicola Standfuss, 1888; Euxoa eremicola (Standfuss, 1888)

= Dichagyris eremicola =

Species of moth

Dichagyris eremicola is a moth of the family Noctuidae. It is found in southern and eastern Russia, the southern Urals, Turkey, Turkestan, central Asia and the Altai Mountains.
