= Dichagyris kyune =

Scientific classification
- Kingdom: Animalia
- Phylum: Arthropoda
- Clade: Pancrustacea
- Class: Insecta
- Order: Lepidoptera
- Superfamily: Noctuoidea
- Family: Noctuidae
- Genus: Dichagyris
- Species: D. kyune

Binomial name
- Dichagyris kyune (Barnes, 1904)

Species of moth

Dichagyris kyune is a species of cutworm or dart moth in the family Noctuidae. It was first described by William Barnes in 1904 and it is found in North America.
