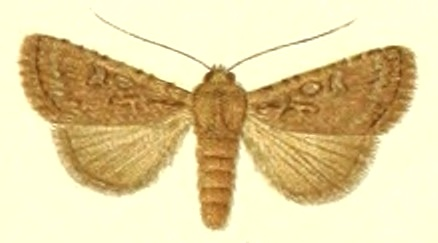

Scientific classification
- Domain: Eukaryota
- Kingdom: Animalia
- Phylum: Arthropoda
- Class: Insecta
- Order: Lepidoptera
- Superfamily: Noctuoidea
- Family: Noctuidae
- Genus: Dichagyris
- Species: D. exacta

Binomial name
- Dichagyris exacta (Staudinger, 1888)

Synonyms
- Agrotis exacta Staudinger, 1888; Euxoa exacta (Staudinger, 1888); Ochropleura exacta (Staudinger, 1888); Yigoga exacta (Staudinger, 1888)

= Dichagyris exacta =

Species of moth

Dichagyris exacta is a moth of the family Noctuidae. It is endemic to the Russian plain.
