= Dichagyris devota =

Scientific classification
- Kingdom: Animalia
- Phylum: Arthropoda
- Class: Insecta
- Order: Lepidoptera
- Superfamily: Noctuoidea
- Family: Noctuidae
- Genus: Dichagyris
- Species: D. devota

Binomial name
- Dichagyris devota (Christoph, 1884)

Species of moth

Dichagyris devota is a moth of the family Noctuidae. It is widespread from Turkmenistan, Afghanistan, north Pakistan, Iran, Armenia, southeast Turkey, Israel, and Jordan to the northern parts of Saudi Arabia.

Adults are on wing from February to April in arid areas and from June to October on the Golan Heights. There is one generation per year.
