= Dichagyris nigrescens =

Scientific classification
- Domain: Eukaryota
- Kingdom: Animalia
- Phylum: Arthropoda
- Class: Insecta
- Order: Lepidoptera
- Superfamily: Noctuoidea
- Family: Noctuidae
- Genus: Dichagyris
- Species: D. nigrescens

Binomial name
- Dichagyris nigrescens (Höfner, 1887)

Synonyms
- Agrotis forcipula v. nigrescens Höfner, 1887; Yigoga nigrescens (Höfner, 1887)

Species of moth

Dchagyris nigrescens is a moth of the family Noctuidae. It is found in south and central Europe, the Near East and the Middle East. There is one generation per year and the adults are on wing from May to June. nigrescens was formerly regarded as an aberration of Dichagyris forcipula which it closely resembles.
