= Dichagyris sureyae =

Scientific classification
- Domain: Eukaryota
- Kingdom: Animalia
- Phylum: Arthropoda
- Class: Insecta
- Order: Lepidoptera
- Superfamily: Noctuoidea
- Family: Noctuidae
- Genus: Dichagyris
- Species: D. sureyae

Binomial name
- Dichagyris sureyae (Draudt, 1938)

Synonyms
- Stenosomides sureyae (Draudt, 1938)

Species of moth

Dichagyris sureyae is a moth of the family Noctuidae. It is found in Turkey, south-western Iran and Israel.

Adults are on wing in October. There is one generation per year.

The larvae feed at night on low growing plants.
