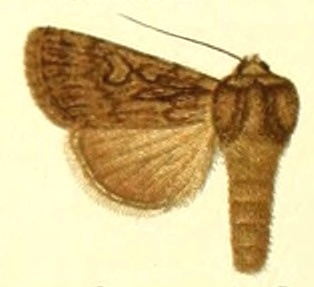
- female
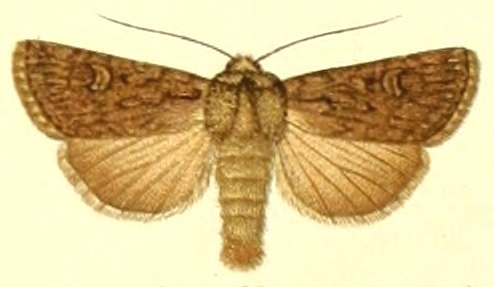
- male

Scientific classification
- Kingdom: Animalia
- Phylum: Arthropoda
- Clade: Pancrustacea
- Class: Insecta
- Order: Lepidoptera
- Superfamily: Noctuoidea
- Family: Noctuidae
- Genus: Dichagyris
- Species: D. celsicola

Binomial name
- Dichagyris celsicola (Bellier, 1859)

Synonyms
- Agrotis celsicola Bellier, 1859; Euxoa celsicola (Bellier, 1859); Ogygia celsicola (Bellier, 1859); Yigoga celsicola (Bellier, 1859)

= Dichagyris celsicola =

Species of moth

Dichagyris celsicola is a moth of the family Noctuidae. It is found in Greece, France, Italy and Turkey. It might also be present in Iran and Iraq.

The wingspan is about 35 mm. Warren (1914) states E celsicola Bell. (7g). Forewing reddish brown with pale dusting; the veins finely black; stigmata large; a black streak from base to claviform, which nearly reaches outer line, and is sometimes filled in with blackish; orbicular pointed at each end, inwardly produced as a streak to base, and outwardly sometimes joined to reniform, the lower part of which is ringed with white; fringe fuscous, unchequered; hindwing whitish, with the outer half fuscous; fringe white. In Europe this species is only found in the French Alps; in W. Asia it is recorded from Syria, Persia and Turkestan.

== Subspecies ==
- Dichagyris celsicola celcicola (France)
- Dichagyris celsicola goateri (Greece)
- Dichagyris celsicola sincera (Turkey)
