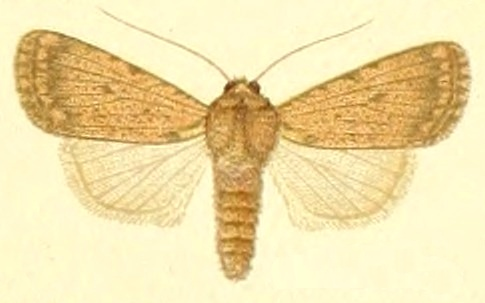

Scientific classification
- Domain: Eukaryota
- Kingdom: Animalia
- Phylum: Arthropoda
- Class: Insecta
- Order: Lepidoptera
- Superfamily: Noctuoidea
- Family: Noctuidae
- Genus: Dichagyris
- Species: D. verecunda

Binomial name
- Dichagyris verecunda (Püngeler, 1898)

Synonyms
- Agrotis verecunda Püngeler, 1898; Euxoa verecunda (Püngeler, 1898); Ochropleura verecunda (Pungeler, 1898); Dichagyris bisignata Kozhantsschikov, 1930

= Dichagyris verecunda =

Species of moth

Dichagyris verecunda is a moth of the family Noctuidae. It is found in the region of southern Siberia and Mongolia, including its type location Kyrgyzstan. This species was first described by Rudolf Püngeler in 1898 and named Agrotis verecunda.
