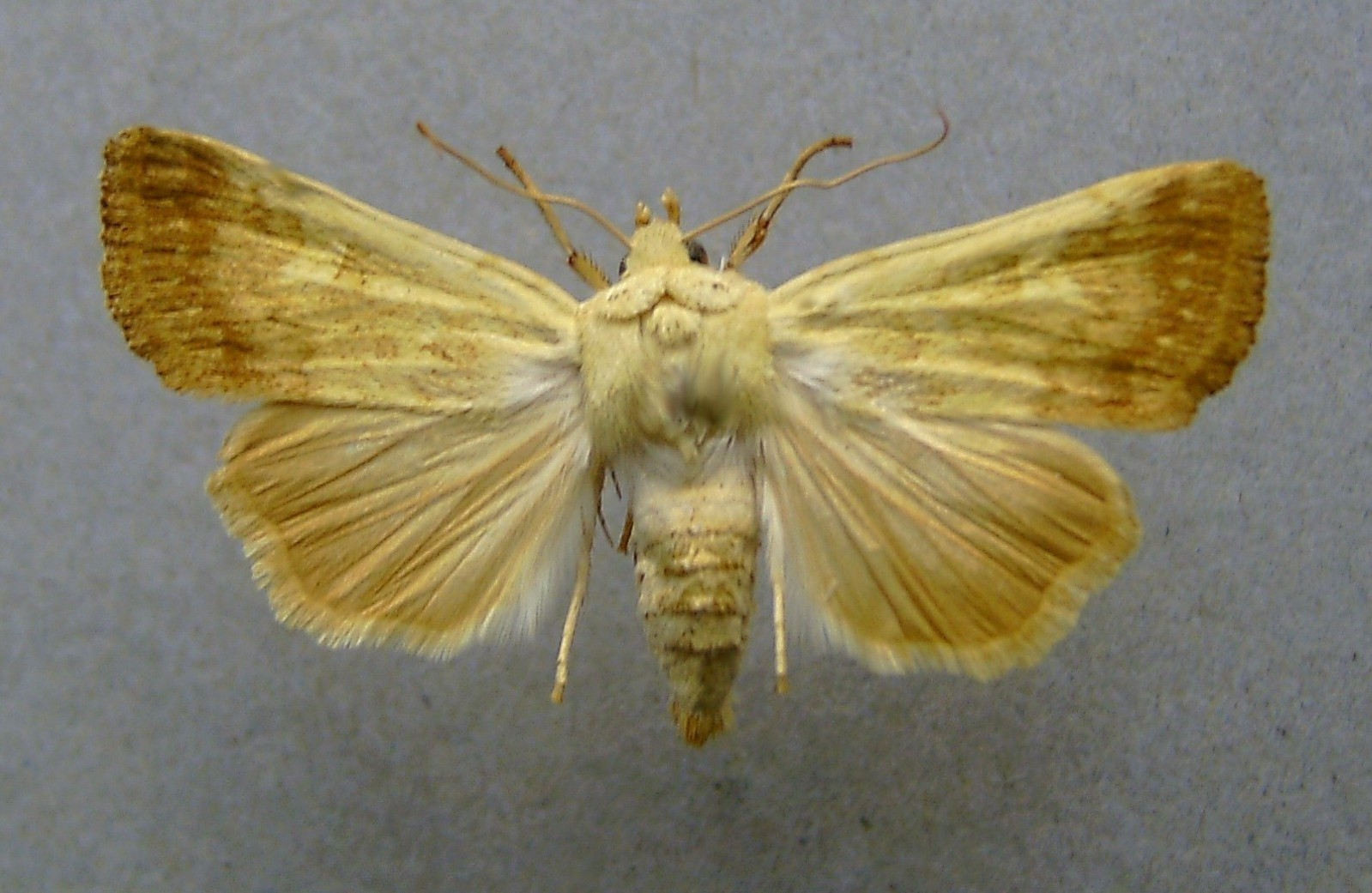

Scientific classification
- Domain: Eukaryota
- Kingdom: Animalia
- Phylum: Arthropoda
- Class: Insecta
- Order: Lepidoptera
- Superfamily: Noctuoidea
- Family: Noctuidae
- Genus: Dichagyris
- Species: D. flavina

Binomial name
- Dichagyris flavina (Herrich-Schäffer, 1852)

Synonyms
- Ochropleura flavina; Agrotis flavina Herrich-Schäffer, [1852]; Yigoga flavina (Herrich-Schäffer, 1852); Dichagyris ochrina (Staudinger, 1897); Agrotis ochrina Staudinger, 1897; Yigoga ochrina Staudinger, 1897; Euxoa ochrina

= Dichagyris flavina =

Species of moth

Dichagyris flavina is a moth of the family Noctuidae. It is found in most of the Balkans and through large parts of the Near East and Middle East. It has been recorded from Bulgaria, Romania, North Macedonia, Greece, Turkey, southern Russia, Armenia, Syria, Lebanon, Israel, Jordan, Iran and Iraq.

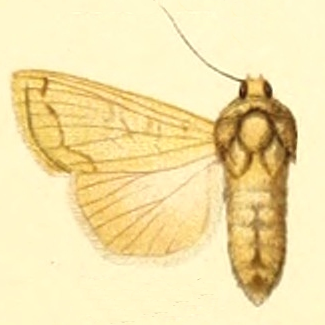
Illustration

The wingspan is 35–44 mm. Adults are on wing from May to July. There is one generation per year.

== Subspecies ==
- Dichagyris flavina flavina
- Dichagyris flavina pretiosa (Romania to Yugoslavia)
