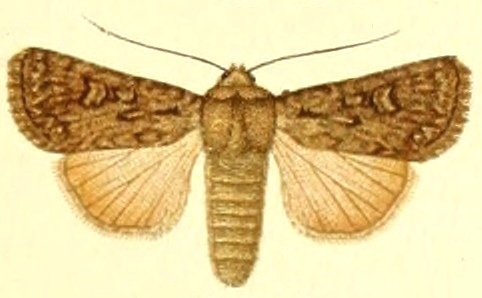

Scientific classification
- Domain: Eukaryota
- Kingdom: Animalia
- Phylum: Arthropoda
- Class: Insecta
- Order: Lepidoptera
- Superfamily: Noctuoidea
- Family: Noctuidae
- Genus: Dichagyris
- Species: D. forcipula

Binomial name
- Dichagyris forcipula (Denis & Schiffermüller, 1775)

Synonyms
- Noctua forcipula Denis & Schiffermüller, 1775; Agrotis forcipula (Denis & Schiffermüller, 1775); Ochropleura forcipula (Denis & Schiffermüller, 1775); Yigoga forcipula (Denis & Schiffermüller, 1775); Phalaena (Noctua) denticulosa Esper, 1794; Phalaena (Noctua) denticulosa Esper, 1798; Agrotis forcipula var. bornicensis Fuchs, 1884; Agrotis forcipula var. helladica Rebel, 1905; Agrotis celsicola var. gueddelana Oberthür, 1918; Yigoga nigrescens amasicola Koçak, 1980; Euxoa (Agrotis) forcipula f. lithargyrula Turati, 1919; Dichagyris samnitica Dannehl, 1923; Dichagyris romanoi Berio, 1980

= Dichagyris forcipula =

Species of moth

Dichagyris forcipula is a moth of the family Noctuidae. It is found from central and southern Europe and Algeria, east to the Caucasus, Turkey, Syria, Lebanon, Iraq and Iran.

== Description ==
Warren (1914) states E. forcipula Schiff. (= denticulosa Esp.) (7f). Forewing dull brown; stigmata outlined in black; the round orbicular and the reniform with whitish rings: subterminal line formed of ochreous points and black wedge-shaped markings: hindwing pale brownish, with whitish fringe. Occurs throughout the South of Europe and in western Asia; - the ab. bornicensis Fuchs is a more unicolorous form, with obscure markings and ab. nigrescens Hofm. (7f), as its name implies, is blackish and larger

== Subspecies ==
- Dichagyris forcipula amasicola (Ukraine, southern Russia)
- Dichagyris forcipula amasina (Turkey, Turkmenistan)
- Dichagyris forcipula bornicensis (Germany)
- Dichagyris forcipula forcipula (France, Italy, Austria, Switzerland, Poland, Czech Republic, Slovakia, Slovenia, former Yugoslavia, Hungary, Romania, Moldova, Ukraine, central and eastern Russia)
- Dichagyris forcipula gueddelanea (Spain, Algeria)
- Dichagyris forcipula helladica (Albania, Bulgaria, Macedonia, Greece)
- Dichagyris forcipula lithargyrula (mainland Italy, Sicily)
