= Dichagyris libanicola =

Scientific classification
- Kingdom: Animalia
- Phylum: Arthropoda
- Class: Insecta
- Order: Lepidoptera
- Superfamily: Noctuoidea
- Family: Noctuidae
- Genus: Dichagyris
- Species: D. libanicola

Binomial name
- Dichagyris libanicola (Corti & Draudt, 1933)

Synonyms
- Yigoga libanicola (Corti & Draudt, 1933)

Species of moth

Dichagyris libanicola is a moth of the family Noctuidae. It is endemic to the Levant, more specifically Lebanon and adjacent parts of Syria and Israel.

Adults are on wing from May to June. There is one generation per year.
