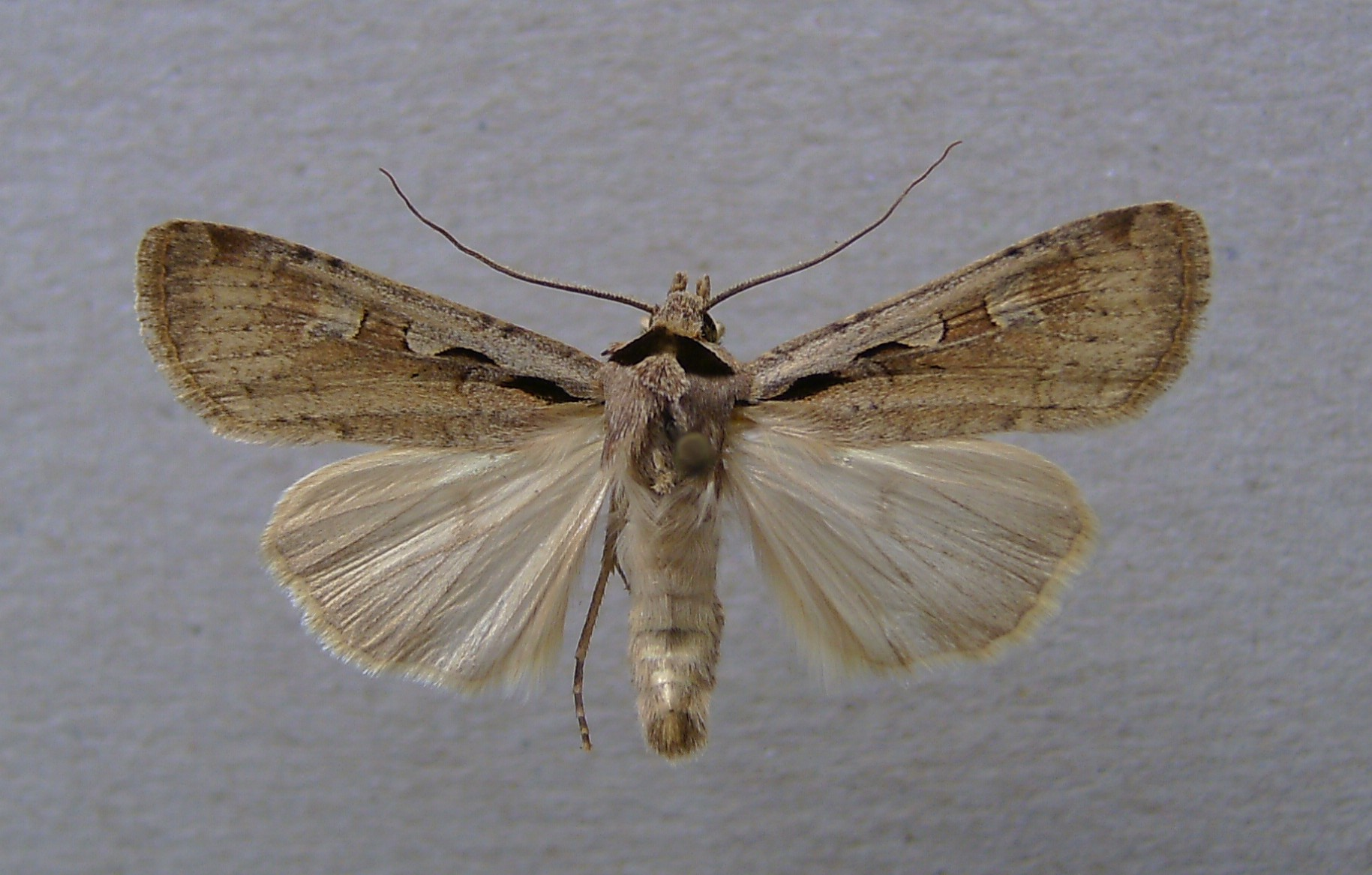

Scientific classification
- Kingdom: Animalia
- Phylum: Arthropoda
- Class: Insecta
- Order: Lepidoptera
- Superfamily: Noctuoidea
- Family: Noctuidae
- Genus: Dichagyris
- Species: D. flammatra

Binomial name
- Dichagyris flammatra (Denis & Schiffermüller, 1775)

Synonyms
- Ochropleura flammatra; Noctua flammatra; Agrotis deleta; Agrotis basiclavis; Basistriga flammatra (Denis & Schiffermüller, 1775)

= Dichagyris flammatra =

Species of moth

Dichagyris flammatra, the black collar, is a moth of the family Noctuidae. The species was first described by Michael Denis and Ignaz Schiffermüller in 1775. It is found in central and southern Europe, Morocco, Algeria, Egypt, western Siberia, Armenia, the Caucasus, Turkey, Lebanon, Syria, Iraq, Iran, Tibet, Afghanistan and northern India.

== Description ==
The wingspan is 42–50 mm. Warren (1914) states R. flammatra Schiff. (= deleta Roll., basiclavis Walk., bimaculata Mill.) (9g). Forewing grey with a brown or lilac tinge; costa towards base paler; a submedian basal streak, the base of cell, and the upper half of tegulae velvety black; orbicular and reniform stigmata large and grey, the cell between them, sometimes dark; markings variable in intensity; hindwing ochreous fuscous, paler at base. A large species with elongate wings, widely spread through Europe, but rarer northwards; in W.Asia it occurs in Kashmir, Persia, Asia Minor and the Altai Mts. in W. Siberia. — Larva green, with pale lateral streaks; on various low plants.

== Biology ==
Adults are on wing from May to June and from August to September depending on the location. There are two generations per year.

The larvae feed on wild strawberry and dandelion.
