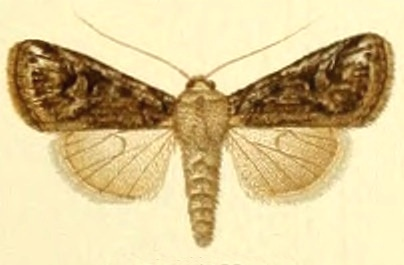

Scientific classification
- Domain: Eukaryota
- Kingdom: Animalia
- Phylum: Arthropoda
- Class: Insecta
- Order: Lepidoptera
- Superfamily: Noctuoidea
- Family: Noctuidae
- Genus: Dichagyris
- Species: D. spissilinea

Binomial name
- Dichagyris spissilinea (Staudinger, 1896)

Synonyms
- Agrotis spissilinea Staudinger, 1896; Euxoa spissilinea (Staudinger, 1896); Ogygia spissilinea (Staudinger, 1896); Stenosomides spissilinea (Staudinger, 1896); Yigoga spissilinea (Staudinger, 1896); Euxoa picturata Kozhantschikov, 1925

= Dichagyris spissilinea =

Species of moth

Dichagyris spissilinea is a moth of the family Noctuidae. It is found in the region of southern Siberia and Mongolia.
