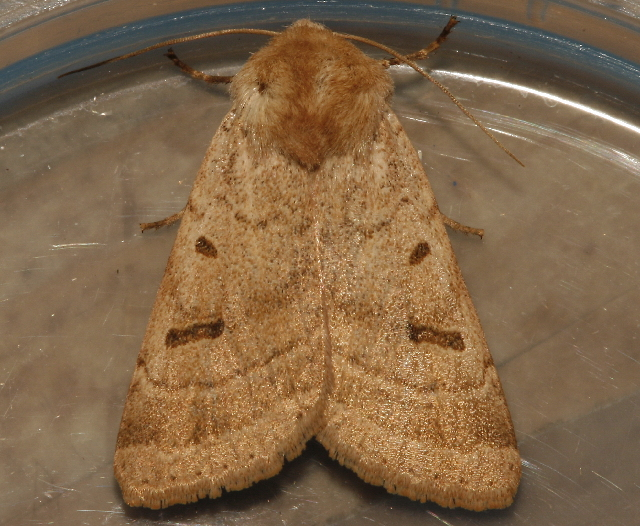

Scientific classification
- Kingdom: Animalia
- Phylum: Arthropoda
- Class: Insecta
- Order: Lepidoptera
- Superfamily: Noctuoidea
- Family: Noctuidae
- Genus: Dichagyris
- Species: D. variabilis

Binomial name
- Dichagyris variabilis (Grote, 1874)

= Dichagyris variabilis =

Species of moth

Dichagyris variabilis, the yellow dart, is a species of cutworm or dart moth in the family Noctuidae.

The MONA or Hodges number for Dichagyris variabilis is 10889.
