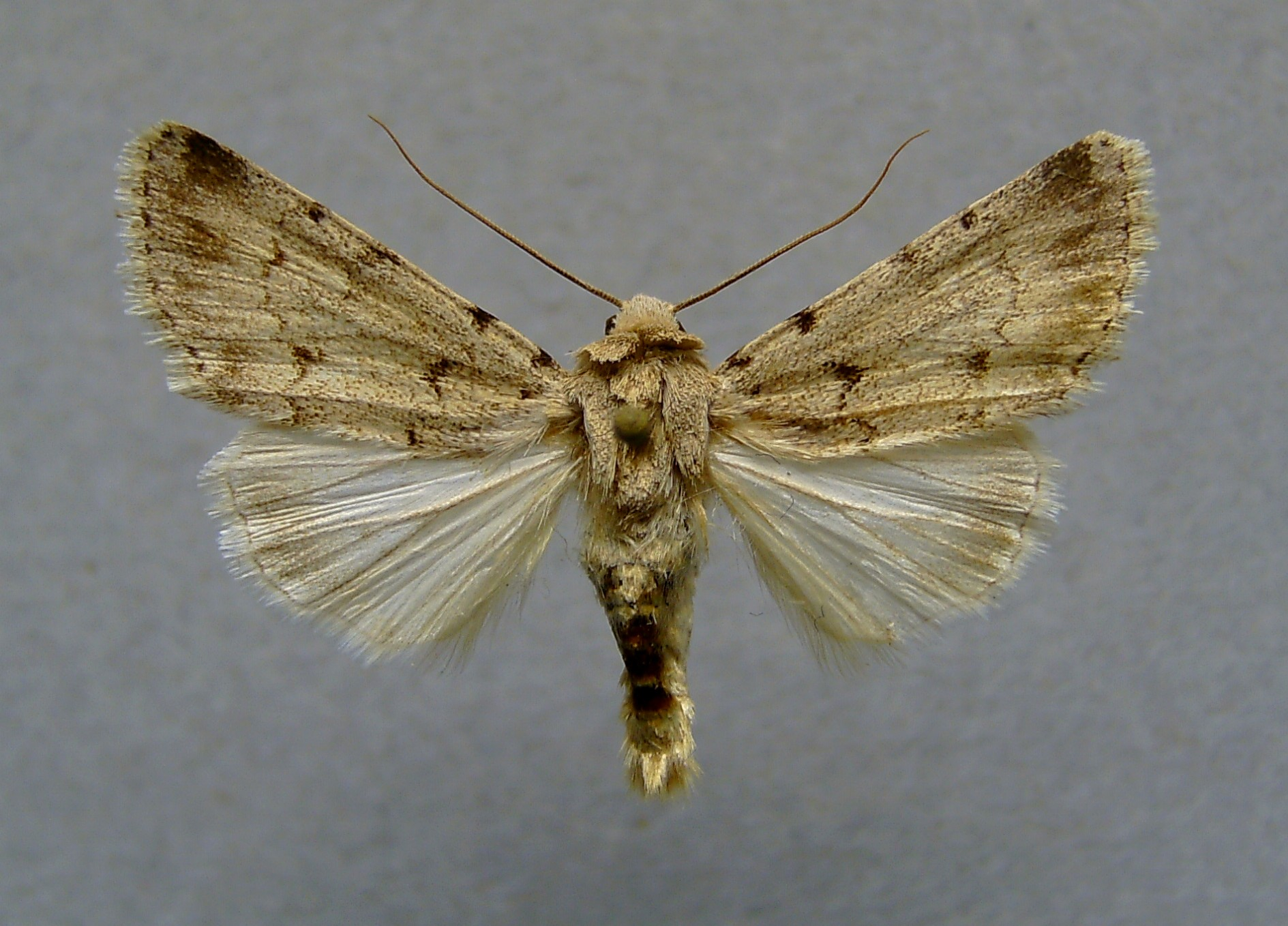

Scientific classification
- Domain: Eukaryota
- Kingdom: Animalia
- Phylum: Arthropoda
- Class: Insecta
- Order: Lepidoptera
- Superfamily: Noctuoidea
- Family: Noctuidae
- Genus: Dichagyris
- Species: D. celebrata

Binomial name
- Dichagyris celebrata (Alphéraky, 1897)

Synonyms
- Agrotis celebrata Alphéraky, 1897; Agrotis celebrata persiaca Kozhantschikov, 1929; Dichagyris armeniaca Kozhantschikov, 1930

= Dichagyris celebrata =

Species of moth

Dichagyris celebrata is a moth of the family Noctuidae. It is found in Armenia, Turkey, Russia, Turkmenistan, Afghanistan and Iran.

The larvae feed on various herbaceous plants.
