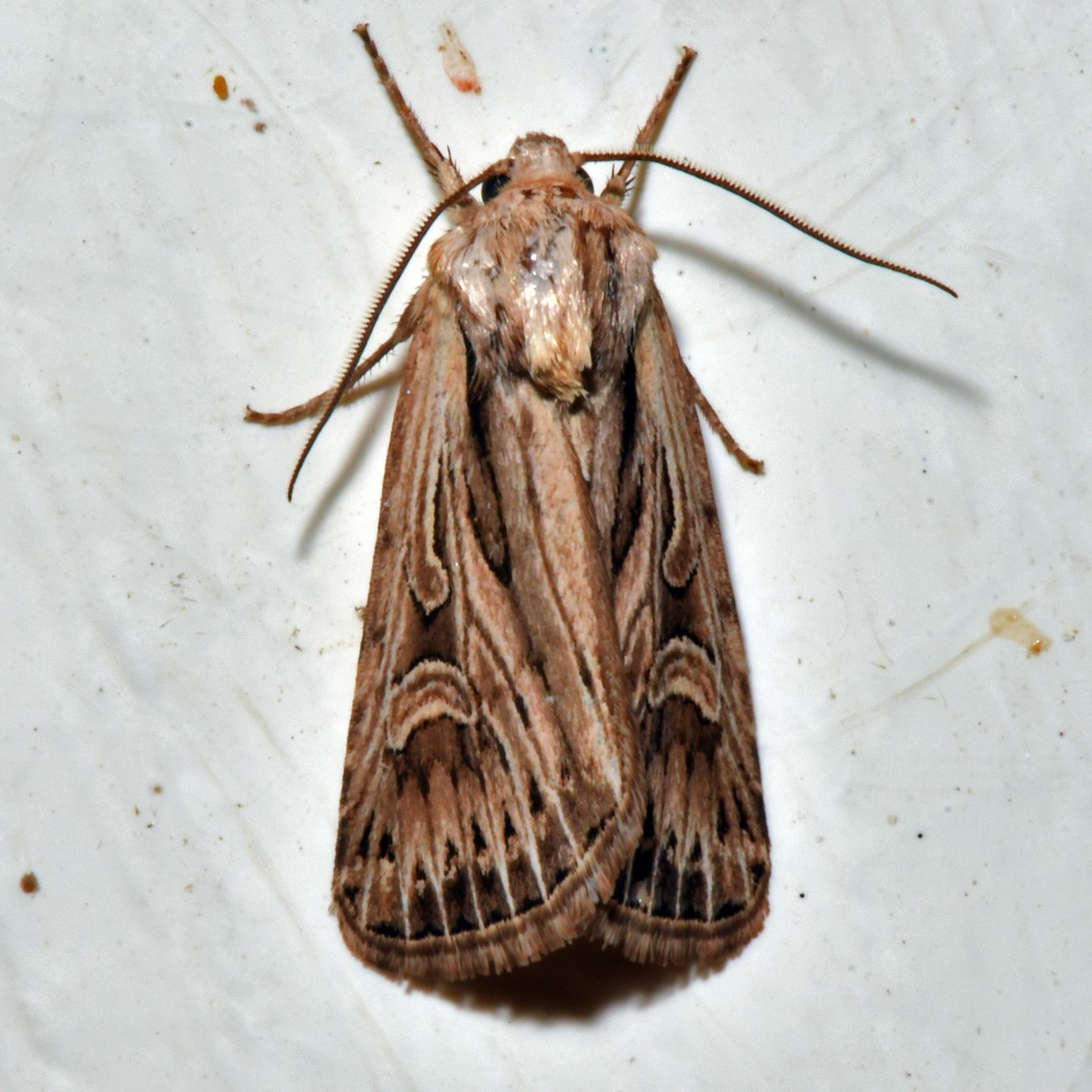

Scientific classification
- Kingdom: Animalia
- Phylum: Arthropoda
- Class: Insecta
- Order: Lepidoptera
- Superfamily: Noctuoidea
- Family: Noctuidae
- Genus: Dichagyris
- Species: D. longidens

Binomial name
- Dichagyris longidens Smith, 1890

Synonyms
- Proragrotis longidens; Feltia longidens; Proagrotis longidens

= Dichagyris longidens =

Species of moth

Dichagyris longidens is a species of moth in the family Noctuidae. It is found in North America, including Colorado, and has a wingspan of about 32 mm. On February 9, 2021, National Geographic published a photo purported to be the first one of a living representative of this species.
