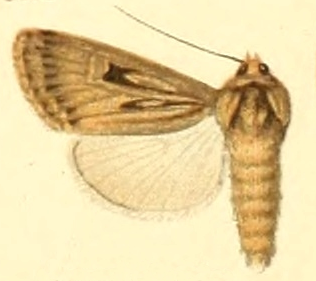

Scientific classification
- Kingdom: Animalia
- Phylum: Arthropoda
- Class: Insecta
- Order: Lepidoptera
- Superfamily: Noctuoidea
- Family: Noctuidae
- Genus: Dichagyris
- Species: D. truculenta

Binomial name
- Dichagyris truculenta (Lederer, 1853)

Synonyms
- Agrotis truculenta Lederer, 1853; Yigoga truculenta (Lederer, 1853); Lycophotia toxistigma Hampson, 1903

= Dichagyris truculenta =

Species of moth

Dichagyris truculenta is a moth of the family Noctuidae. It is found in the Mediterranean and central Asia from the Altai Mountains through the Near East and Middle East.

Adults are on wing from May to August. There is one generation per year.

== Subspecies ==
- Yigoga truculenta truculenta (western Siberia, central Asia, Altai, Turkestan)
- Yigoga truculenta toxistigma (Anatolia, Iran)
