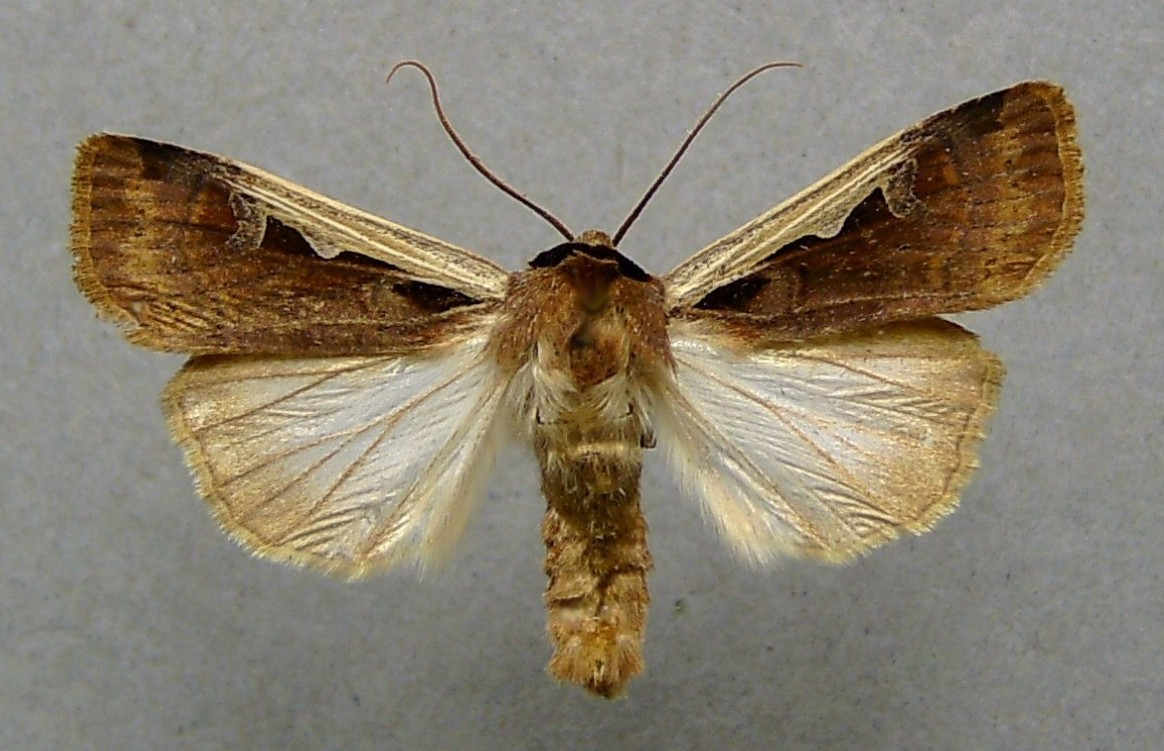

Scientific classification
- Domain: Eukaryota
- Kingdom: Animalia
- Phylum: Arthropoda
- Class: Insecta
- Order: Lepidoptera
- Superfamily: Noctuoidea
- Family: Noctuidae
- Genus: Dichagyris
- Subgenus: Albocosta
- Species: D. musiva

Binomial name
- Dichagyris musiva (Hübner, 1803)

Synonyms
- Noctua musiva; Ochropleura musiva; Albocosta musiva

= Dichagyris musiva =

Species of moth

Dichagyris musiva is a moth of the family Noctuidae. It is found in some mountainous areas of Europe, Turkey, Armenia, the Caucasus, Anatolia, southern Siberia, Mongolia, Tibet and western China.

== Description ==
The wingspan is 38–44 mm. Warren (1914) states R. musiva Hbn. (8f). Forewing grey-brown with a reddish tint; costal area broadly cream-white to outer line; the edges of the two stigmata also cream-white, ' their centres grey; the cell and a blotch below it at base black brown, like the upper part of shoulders; lines all indistinct; hindwing cream-white, the veins and apex grey; fringe yellowish white. In Europe this species extends from S. Russia through Hungary. Austria and Germany to Switzerland and is wide spread through Asia, occurring in Armenia and Asia Minor, in the Altai Alts, in Siberia, W. and E. Turkestan, Mongolia and Amurland. Larva mottled yellowish brown and dark, with oblique subdorsal streaks; the lines dark; on various lower plants.

== Biology ==
Adults are on wing from June to September depending on the location.

The larvae feed on various herbaceous plants, including Cichorium intybus, Galium mollugo, Arabis hirsuta and Taraxacum species.
