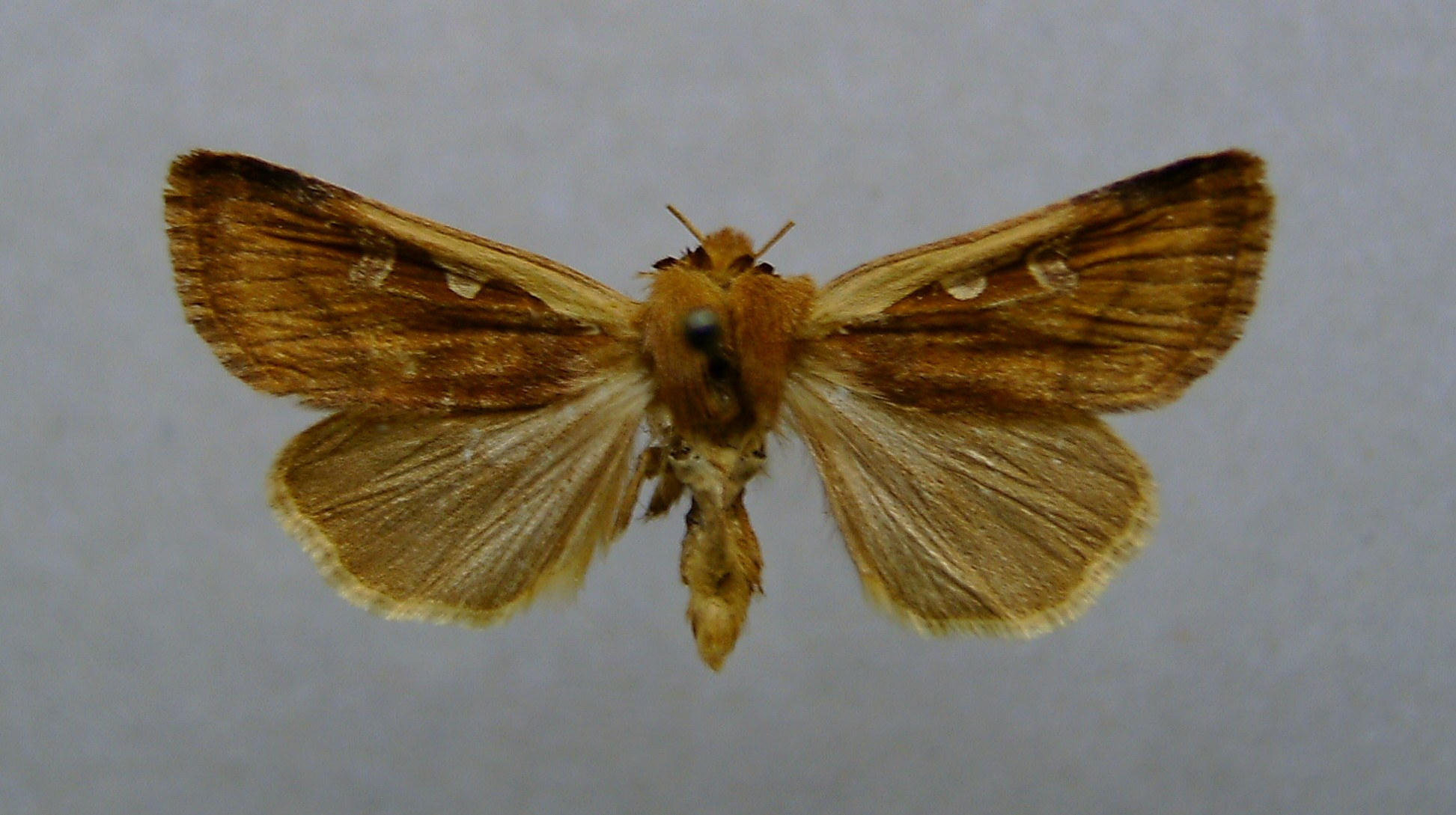

Scientific classification
- Domain: Eukaryota
- Kingdom: Animalia
- Phylum: Arthropoda
- Class: Insecta
- Order: Lepidoptera
- Superfamily: Noctuoidea
- Family: Noctuidae
- Genus: Dichagyris
- Species: D. juldussi

Binomial name
- Dichagyris juldussi (Alphéraky, 1882)

Synonyms
- Agrotis juldussi Alphéraky, 1882; Albocosta juldussi; Ochropleura juldussi

= Dichagyris juldussi =

Species of moth

Dichagyris juldussi is a moth of the family Noctuidae. It is found in western China, western Tibet and Turkestan.
