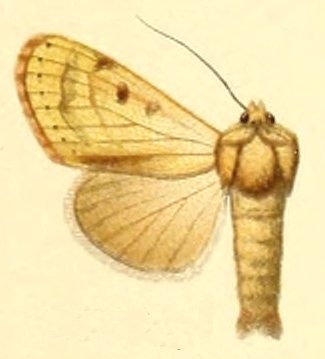

Scientific classification
- Kingdom: Animalia
- Phylum: Arthropoda
- Class: Insecta
- Order: Lepidoptera
- Superfamily: Noctuoidea
- Family: Noctuidae
- Genus: Dichagyris
- Species: D. romanovi

Binomial name
- Dichagyris romanovi (Christoph, 1885)

Synonyms
- Yigoga karsholti Fibiger, 1990; Agrotis romanovi Christoph, 1885; Yigoga romanovi (Christoph, 1885); Euxoa romanovi

= Dichagyris romanovi =

Species of moth

Dichagyris romanovi is a moth of the family Noctuidae. It is found from Turkey and Transcaucasia to south-western Iran, Israel and Jordan.

Adults are on wing from March to November. There is one generation per year.
