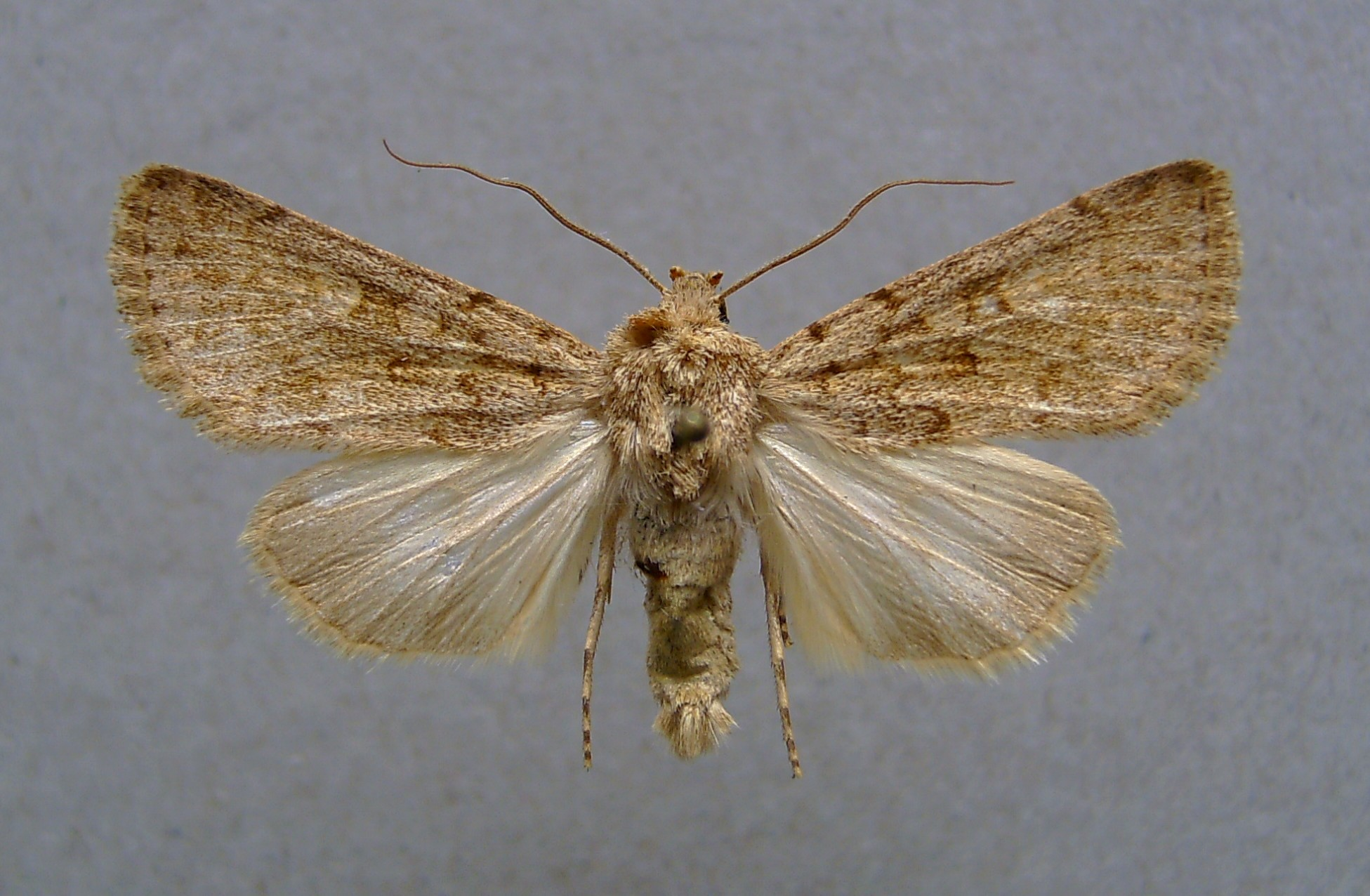

Scientific classification
- Domain: Eukaryota
- Kingdom: Animalia
- Phylum: Arthropoda
- Class: Insecta
- Order: Lepidoptera
- Superfamily: Noctuoidea
- Family: Noctuidae
- Genus: Dichagyris
- Species: D. erubescens

Binomial name
- Dichagyris erubescens (Staudinger, 1892)

Synonyms
- Agrotis renigera var. erubescens Staudinger, 1891

= Dichagyris erubescens =

Species of moth

Dichagyris erubescens is a moth of the family Noctuidae. It is found in Turkey and adjacent areas, more specifically the Transcaucasia, Iraq, western Iran, Israel, Syria, Jordan and the Sinai in Egypt.

Adults are on wing from May to July. There is one generation per year.
