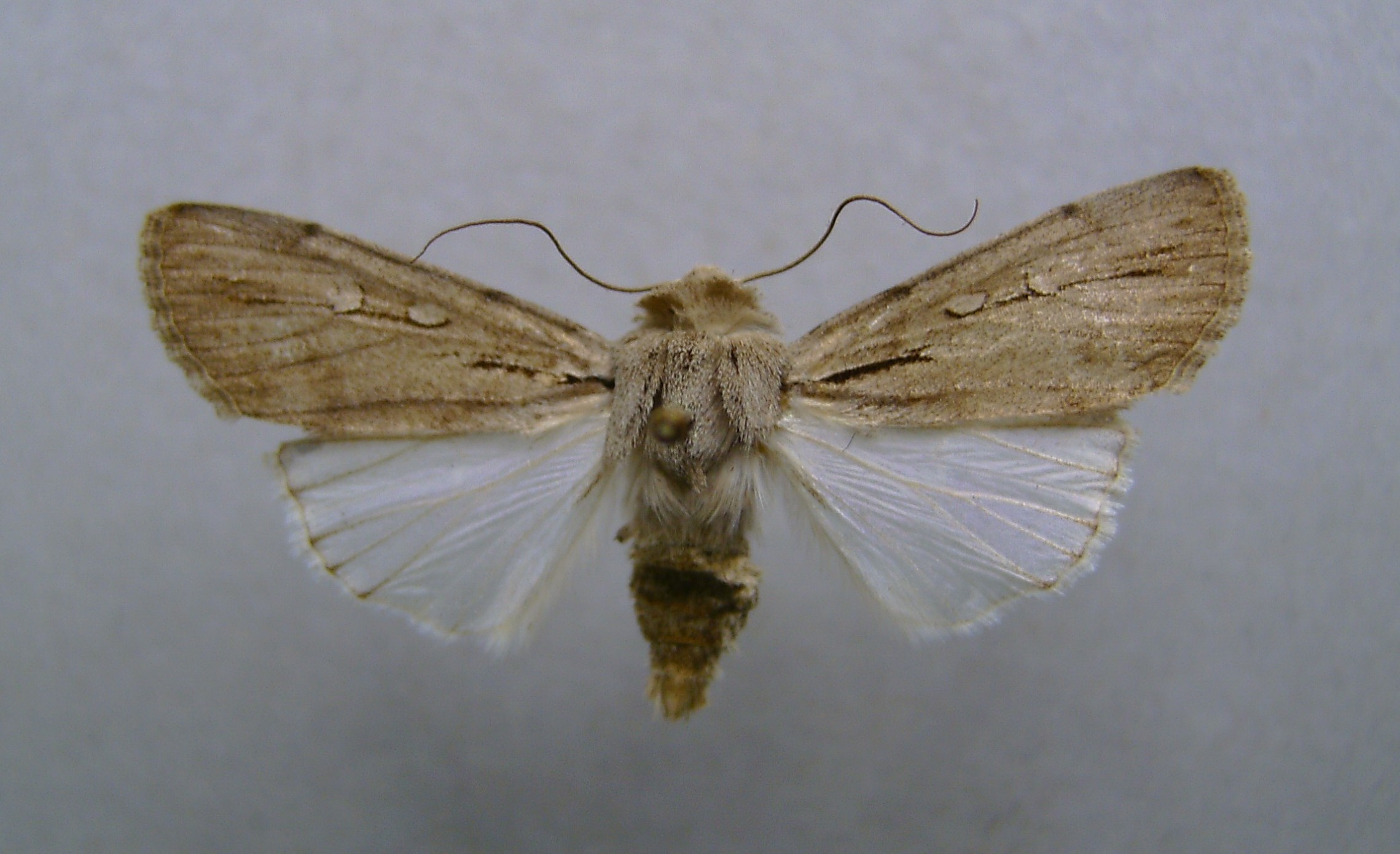

Scientific classification
- Kingdom: Animalia
- Phylum: Arthropoda
- Clade: Pancrustacea
- Class: Insecta
- Order: Lepidoptera
- Superfamily: Noctuoidea
- Family: Noctuidae
- Subfamily: Noctuinae
- Tribe: Noctuini
- Genus: Dichagyris; Lederer, 1857

Synonyms
- Celagyris Beck, 1996; Constantargyris Beck, 1996; Dichagyria Lederer, 1857; Loxagrotis McDunnough, 1929; Orbifrons Staudinger, 1877; Phleboeis Christoph, 1887; Proragrotis McDunnough, 1929; Pseudorichia Lafontaine, 2004; Pseudoseptis McDunnough, 1929; Renyigoga Beck, 1996; Stellagyris Beck, 1996; Trumuspis Beck, 1996; Vallagyris Beck, 1996

= Dichagyris =

Genus of moths

Dichagyris is a genus of moths of the family Noctuidae. The former genera Pseudorthosia and Mesembragrotis are now considered subgenera of Dichagyris. From Greek dikha-gyris 'apart, asunder; double' + 'the finest meal or flour'; English pronunciation: /digh-kuh-JIGH-riss/, IPA [dɑj•kə'dʒɑj•ɹɪs].

== Species ==
- Dichagyris acclivis (Morrison, 1875)
- Dichagyris adelfi Nilsson & Svendsen, 1999
- Dichagyris amoena Staudinger, 1892
- Dichagyris anastasia (Draudt, 1936)
- Dichagyris arabella (Dyar, 1901)
- Dichagyris broui Lafontaine, 2004
- Dichagyris candelisequa (Denis & Schiffermüller, 1775)
- Dichagyris capota (Smith, 1908) (syn: Dichagyris capnota (Smith, 1908), misspelling)
- Dichagyris cataclivis (Dyar, 1910)
- Dichagyris celebrata (Alphéraky, 1897)
- Dichagyris celsicola (Bellier, 1859)
- Dichagyris constanti (Millière, 1860)
- Dichagyris cyminopristes (Dyar, 1912)
- Dichagyris devota (Christoph, 1884)
- Dichagyris dubitata McDunnough, 1933
- Dichagyris duskei Moberg & Fibiger, 1990
- Dichagyris elbursica (Draudt, 1937)
- Dichagyris endemica Svendsen & Nilsson, 1999
- Dichagyris eremicola (Standfuss, 1888)
- Dichagyris erubescens (Staudinger, 1891)
- Dichagyris exacta (Staudinger, 1888)
- Dichagyris fidelis (de Joannis, 1903)
- Dichagyris flammatra (Schiffermüller, 1775)
- Dichagyris flavina (Herrich-Schäffer, 1852)
- Dichagyris forcipula (Denis & Schiffermüller, 1775)
- Dichagyris forficula (Eversmann, 1851)
- Dichagyris gracilis (Wagner, 1929)
- Dichagyris grandipennis (Grote, 1883)
- Dichagyris grotei (Franclemont & Todd, 1983)
- Dichagyris herculea (Corti & Draudt, 1933)
- Dichagyris himalayensis Turati, 1933
- Dichagyris imperator (A. Bang-Haas, 1912)
- Dichagyris insula Fibiger, 1997
- Dichagyris iranicola Koçak, 1980
- Dichagyris juldussi (Alphéraky, 1882)
- Dichagyris kyune (Barnes, 1904)
- Dichagyris larga (Smith, 1908)
- Dichagyris leucomelas Brandt, 1941
- Dichagyris libanicola (Corti & Draudt, 1933)
- Dichagyris lobato (Barnes, 1904)
- Dichagyris longidens (Smith, 1890) (formerly Proragrotis longidens and Proagrotis longidens)
- Dichagyris lutescens (Eversmann, 1844)
- Dichagyris lux Nupponen & Fibiger, 2002
- Dichagyris madida (Guenée, 1852) (syn: Dichagyris hahama (Dyar, 1919))
- Dichagyris mansoura (Chrétien, 1911)
- Dichagyris melanura (Kollar, 1846)
- Dichagyris melanuroides Kozhantshikov, 1930
- Dichagyris mizteca (Schaus, 1894)
- Dichagyris multicuspis (Eversmann, 1852)
- Dichagyris musiva (Hübner, 1803)
- Dichagyris nachadira (Brandt, 1941)
- Dichagyris neoclivis (Barnes & Benjamin, 1924)
- Dichagyris nigrescens (Höfner, 1888)
- Dichagyris orientis (Alphéraky, 1882)
- Dichagyris pfeifferi (Corti & Draudt, 1933)
- Dichagyris plumbea (Alphéraky, 1887)
- Dichagyris polycala Lafontaine, 2004
- Dichagyris proclivis (Smith, [1888])
- Dichagyris pyrsogramma (Dyar, 1916)
- Dichagyris reliqua Lafontaine & Schweitzer, 2004
- Dichagyris renigera (Hübner, [1808])
- Dichagyris rhadamanthys (Reisser, 1958)
- Dichagyris romanovi (Christoph, 1885)
- Dichagyris rubidior (Corti, 1933)
- Dichagyris ruckesi Barnes & Benjamin, 1927
- Dichagyris salina (Barnes, 1904)
- Dichagyris serraticornis (Staudinger, 1897)
- Dichagyris signifera (Denis & Schiffermüller, 1775)
- Dichagyris singularis (Staudinger, 1892)
- Dichagyris socorro (Barnes, 1904) (syn: Dichagyris pampolycala (Dyar, 1912))
- Dichagyris soror Fibiger, 1997
- Dichagyris spissilinea (Staudinger, 1896)
- Dichagyris squalidior (Staudinger, 1901)
- Dichagyris squalorum (Eversmann, 1856)
- Dichagyris stellans (Corti & Draudt, 1933)
- Dichagyris sureyae (Draudt, 1938)
- Dichagyris terminicincta (Corti, 1933)
- Dichagyris timbor (Dyar, 1919)
- Dichagyris triphaenoides (Dyar, 1912)
- Dichagyris truculenta (Lederer, 1853)
- Dichagyris tyrannus (A. Bang-Haas, 1912)
- Dichagyris vallesiaca (Boisduval, [1837])
- Dichagyris variabilis (Grote, 1874)
- Dichagyris verecunda (Püngeler, 1898)
- Dichagyris wilsoni
