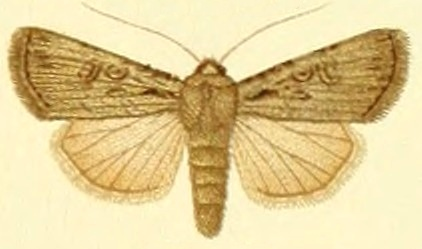
- Dichagyris orientis orientis

Scientific classification
- Domain: Eukaryota
- Kingdom: Animalia
- Phylum: Arthropoda
- Class: Insecta
- Order: Lepidoptera
- Superfamily: Noctuoidea
- Family: Noctuidae
- Genus: Dichagyris
- Species: D. orientis

Binomial name
- Dichagyris orientis (Alphéraky, 1882)

Synonyms
- Agrotis orientis Alphéraky, 1882; Euxoa orientis (Alphéraky, 1882); Ogygia orientis (Alphéraky, 1882); Yigoga orientis (Alphéraky, 1882)

= Dichagyris orientis =

Species of moth

Dichagyris orientis is a moth of the family Noctuidae. It is found from Croatia, south to Macedonia, east to Romania, Ukraine and Russia and further east to central Asia, Turkestan, south-western Siberia, the Caucasus, Armenia, Turkey, Iran, western China and Mongolia (the Altai Mountains).

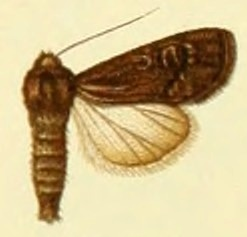
Dichagyris orientis pygmaea

== Subspecies ==
- Dichagyris orientis orientis
- Dichagyris orientis pseudosignifera (Boursin, 1952) (Croatia, Macedonia, Romania, Ukraine, southern Russia)
- Dichagyris orientis pygmaea (Hampson, 1903) (eastern Russia)
- ?Dichagyris orientis improcera
