= List of moths of the Iberian Peninsula (N–O) =

Location of the Iberian Peninsula

Iberian moths represent about 4,454 different types of moths. The moths (mostly nocturnal) and butterflies (mostly diurnal) together make up the taxonomic order Lepidoptera.

This is a list of moth species which have been recorded in Portugal, Spain and Gibraltar (together forming the Iberian Peninsula). This list also includes species found on the Balearic Islands.

== Nepticulidae ==
- Acalyptris minimella (Rebel, 1924)
- Acalyptris platani (Muller-Rutz, 1934)
- Acalyptris pyrenaica A. & Z. Lastuvka, 1993
- Bohemannia pulverosella (Stainton, 1849)
- Ectoedemia albifasciella (Heinemann, 1871)
- Ectoedemia andalusiae van Nieukerken, 1985
- Ectoedemia angulifasciella (Stainton, 1849)
- Ectoedemia caradjai (Groschke, 1944)
- Ectoedemia contorta van Nieukerken, 1985
- Ectoedemia coscoja van Nieukerken, A. & Z. Lastuvka, 2010
- Ectoedemia erythrogenella (de Joannis, 1908)
- Ectoedemia hannoverella (Glitz, 1872)
- Ectoedemia haraldi (Soffner, 1942)
- Ectoedemia heringi (Toll, 1934)
- Ectoedemia ilicis (Mendes, 1910)
- Ectoedemia intimella (Zeller, 1848)
- Ectoedemia leucothorax van Nieukerken, 1985
- Ectoedemia occultella (Linnaeus, 1767)
- Ectoedemia phaeolepis van Nieukerken, A. & Z. Lastuvka, 2010
- Ectoedemia pubescivora (Weber, 1937)
- Ectoedemia subbimaculella (Haworth, 1828)
- Ectoedemia suberis (Stainton, 1869)
- Ectoedemia turbidella (Zeller, 1848)
- Ectoedemia decentella (Herrich-Schäffer, 1855)
- Ectoedemia obtusa (Puplesis & Diskus, 1996)
- Ectoedemia euphorbiella (Stainton, 1869)
- Ectoedemia septembrella (Stainton, 1849)
- Ectoedemia atrifrontella (Stainton, 1851)
- Ectoedemia hispanica van Nieukerken, 1985
- Ectoedemia liebwerdella Zimmermann, 1940
- Ectoedemia liguricella Klimesch, 1953
- Ectoedemia longicaudella Klimesch, 1953
- Ectoedemia vivesi A.Lastuvka, Z. Lastuvka & van Nieukerken, 2010
- Parafomoria cistivora (Peyerimhoff, 1871)
- Parafomoria fumanae A. & Z. Lastuvka, 2005
- Parafomoria halimivora van Nieukerken, 1985
- Parafomoria ladaniphila (Mendes, 1910)
- Parafomoria liguricella (Klimesch, 1946)
- Parafomoria pseudocistivora van Nieukerken, 1983
- Parafomoria tingitella (Walsingham, 1904)
- Simplimorpha promissa (Staudinger, 1871)
- Stigmella alaternella (Le Marchand, 1937)
- Stigmella alnetella (Stainton, 1856)
- Stigmella anomalella (Goeze, 1783)
- Stigmella assimilella (Zeller, 1848)
- Stigmella atricapitella (Haworth, 1828)
- Stigmella aurella (Fabricius, 1775)
- Stigmella auromarginella (Richardson, 1890)
- Stigmella basiguttella (Heinemann, 1862)
- Stigmella centifoliella (Zeller, 1848)
- Stigmella crataegella (Klimesch, 1936)
- Stigmella crenulatae (Klimesch, 1975)
- Stigmella dorsiguttella (Johansson, 1971)
- Stigmella eberhardi (Johansson, 1971)
- Stigmella floslactella (Haworth, 1828)
- Stigmella freyella (Heyden, 1858)
- Stigmella glutinosae (Stainton, 1858)
- Stigmella hemargyrella (Kollar, 1832)
- Stigmella hybnerella (Hübner, 1796)
- Stigmella ilicifoliella (Mendes, 1918)
- Stigmella incognitella (Herrich-Schäffer, 1855)
- Stigmella lapponica (Wocke, 1862)
- Stigmella malella (Stainton, 1854)
- Stigmella mespilicola (Frey, 1856)
- Stigmella microtheriella (Stainton, 1854)
- Stigmella nivenburgensis (Preissecker, 1942)
- Stigmella obliquella (Heinemann, 1862)
- Stigmella paradoxa (Frey, 1858)
- Stigmella perpygmaeella (Doubleday, 1859)
- Stigmella plagicolella (Stainton, 1854)
- Stigmella regiella (Herrich-Schäffer, 1855)
- Stigmella rhamnella (Herrich-Schäffer, 1860)
- Stigmella roborella (Johansson, 1971)
- Stigmella rolandi van Nieukerken, 1990
- Stigmella salicis (Stainton, 1854)
- Stigmella samiatella (Zeller, 1839)
- Stigmella sorbi (Stainton, 1861)
- Stigmella speciosa (Frey, 1858)
- Stigmella suberivora (Stainton, 1869)
- Stigmella thuringiaca (Petry, 1904)
- Stigmella tiliae (Frey, 1856)
- Stigmella tityrella (Stainton, 1854)
- Stigmella trimaculella (Haworth, 1828)
- Stigmella ulmivora (Fologne, 1860)
- Stigmella vimineticola (Frey, 1856)
- Trifurcula alypella Klimesch, 1975
- Trifurcula andalusica Z. & A. Lastuvka, 2007
- Trifurcula bleonella (Chretien, 1904)
- Trifurcula bupleurella (Chretien, 1907)
- Trifurcula corleyi Z. & A. Lastuvka, 2007
- Trifurcula headleyella (Stainton, 1854)
- Trifurcula lavandulae Z. & A. Lastuvka, 2007
- Trifurcula melanoptera van Nieukerken & Puplesis, 1991
- Trifurcula montana Z. Lastuvka, A. Lastuvka & Van Nieukerken, 2007
- Trifurcula pederi Z. & A. Lastuvka, 2007
- Trifurcula rosmarinella (Chretien, 1914)
- Trifurcula salvifoliae Z. & A. Lastuvka, 2007
- Trifurcula sanctibenedicti Klimesch, 1979
- Trifurcula saturejae (Parenti, 1963)
- Trifurcula stoechadella Klimesch, 1975
- Trifurcula teucriella (Chretien, 1914)
- Trifurcula thymi (Szocs, 1965)
- Trifurcula anthyllidella Klimesch, 1975
- Trifurcula cryptella (Stainton, 1856)
- Trifurcula eurema (Tutt, 1899)
- Trifurcula ortneri (Klimesch, 1951)
- Trifurcula beirnei Puplesis, 1984
- Trifurcula calycotomella A. & Z. Lastuvka, 1997
- Trifurcula coronillae van Nieukerken, 1990
- Trifurcula iberica van Nieukerken, 1990
- Trifurcula immundella (Zeller, 1839)
- Trifurcula josefklimeschi van Nieukerken, 1990
- Trifurcula orientella Klimesch, 1953
- Trifurcula pallidella (Duponchel, 1843)
- Trifurcula silviae van Nieukerken, 1990
- Trifurcula squamatella Stainton, 1849
- Trifurcula subnitidella (Duponchel, 1843)
- Trifurcula victoris van Nieukerken, 1990

== Noctuidae ==
- Abrostola asclepiadis (Denis & Schiffermuller, 1775)
- Abrostola tripartita (Hufnagel, 1766)
- Abrostola triplasia (Linnaeus, 1758)
- Acontia lucida (Hufnagel, 1766)
- Acontia trabealis (Scopoli, 1763)
- Acontia viridisquama Guenee, 1852
- Acosmetia caliginosa (Hübner, 1813)
- Acronicta aceris (Linnaeus, 1758)
- Acronicta leporina (Linnaeus, 1758)
- Acronicta strigosa (Denis & Schiffermuller, 1775)
- Acronicta alni (Linnaeus, 1767)
- Acronicta cuspis (Hübner, 1813)
- Acronicta psi (Linnaeus, 1758)
- Acronicta tridens (Denis & Schiffermuller, 1775)
- Acronicta auricoma (Denis & Schiffermuller, 1775)
- Acronicta euphorbiae (Denis & Schiffermuller, 1775)
- Acronicta rumicis (Linnaeus, 1758)
- Actebia fugax (Treitschke, 1825)
- Actebia photophila (Guenee, 1852)
- Actinotia polyodon (Clerck, 1759)
- Actinotia radiosa (Esper, 1804)
- Aedia funesta (Esper, 1786)
- Aedia leucomelas (Linnaeus, 1758)
- Aegle vespertinalis (Rambur, 1858)
- Agrochola lychnidis (Denis & Schiffermuller, 1775)
- Agrochola helvola (Linnaeus, 1758)
- Agrochola litura (Linnaeus, 1758)
- Agrochola lunosa (Haworth, 1809)
- Agrochola meridionalis (Staudinger, 1871)
- Agrochola orejoni Agenjo, 1951
- Agrochola pistacinoides (d'Aubuisson, 1867)
- Agrochola haematidea (Duponchel, 1827)
- Agrochola blidaensis (Stertz, 1915)
- Agrochola lota (Clerck, 1759)
- Agrochola macilenta (Hübner, 1809)
- Agrochola circellaris (Hufnagel, 1766)
- Agrotis alexandriensis Baker, 1894
- Agrotis bigramma (Esper, 1790)
- Agrotis boetica (Rambur, 1837)
- Agrotis charoae Yela, Fibiger, Zilli & Ronkay, 2010
- Agrotis chretieni (Dumont, 1903)
- Agrotis cinerea (Denis & Schiffermuller, 1775)
- Agrotis clavis (Hufnagel, 1766)
- Agrotis exclamationis (Linnaeus, 1758)
- Agrotis fatidica (Hübner, 1824)
- Agrotis graslini Rambur, 1848
- Agrotis herzogi Rebel, 1911
- Agrotis ipsilon (Hufnagel, 1766)
- Agrotis lasserrei (Oberthür, 1881)
- Agrotis lata Treitschke, 1835
- Agrotis obesa Boisduval, 1829
- Agrotis pierreti (Bugnion, 1838)
- Agrotis puta (Hübner, 1803)
- Agrotis ripae Hübner, 1823
- Agrotis sabulosa Rambur, 1837
- Agrotis schawerdai Bytinski-Salz, 1937
- Agrotis segetum (Denis & Schiffermuller, 1775)
- Agrotis simplonia (Geyer, 1832)
- Agrotis spinifera (Hübner, 1808)
- Agrotis trux (Hübner, 1824)
- Agrotis turatii Standfuss, 1888
- Agrotis vestigialis (Hufnagel, 1766)
- Agrotis yelai Fibiger, 1990
- Allophyes alfaroi Agenjo, 1951
- Alvaradoia disjecta (Rothschild, 1920)
- Amephana anarrhini (Duponchel, 1840)
- Amephana aurita (Fabricius, 1787)
- Ammoconia caecimacula (Denis & Schiffermuller, 1775)
- Ammoconia senex (Geyer, 1828)
- Ammopolia witzenmanni (Standfuss, 1890)
- Amphipoea oculea (Linnaeus, 1761)
- Amphipyra berbera Rungs, 1949
- Amphipyra effusa Boisduval, 1828
- Amphipyra livida (Denis & Schiffermuller, 1775)
- Amphipyra pyramidea (Linnaeus, 1758)
- Amphipyra tetra (Fabricius, 1787)
- Amphipyra tragopoginis (Clerck, 1759)
- Amphipyra cinnamomea (Goeze, 1781)
- Anaplectoides prasina (Denis & Schiffermuller, 1775)
- Anarta myrtilli (Linnaeus, 1761)
- Anarta dianthi (Tauscher, 1809)
- Anarta gredosi (de Laever, 1977)
- Anarta odontites (Boisduval, 1829)
- Anarta pugnax (Hübner, 1824)
- Anarta sodae (Rambur, 1829)
- Anarta trifolii (Hufnagel, 1766)
- Anorthoa munda (Denis & Schiffermuller, 1775)
- Anthracia ephialtes (Hübner, 1822)
- Antitype chi (Linnaeus, 1758)
- Apamea alpigena (Boisduval, 1837)
- Apamea anceps (Denis & Schiffermuller, 1775)
- Apamea aquila Donzel, 1837
- Apamea arabs Oberthür, 1881
- Apamea crenata (Hufnagel, 1766)
- Apamea epomidion (Haworth, 1809)
- Apamea furva (Denis & Schiffermuller, 1775)
- Apamea illyria Freyer, 1846
- Apamea lateritia (Hufnagel, 1766)
- Apamea lithoxylaea (Denis & Schiffermuller, 1775)
- Apamea maillardi (Geyer, 1834)
- Apamea monoglypha (Hufnagel, 1766)
- Apamea platinea (Treitschke, 1825)
- Apamea remissa (Hübner, 1809)
- Apamea scolopacina (Esper, 1788)
- Apamea sordens (Hufnagel, 1766)
- Apamea sublustris (Esper, 1788)
- Apamea syriaca (Osthelder, 1933)
- Apamea unanimis (Hübner, 1813)
- Apamea zeta (Treitschke, 1825)
- Aporophyla australis (Boisduval, 1829)
- Aporophyla chioleuca (Herrich-Schäffer, 1850)
- Aporophyla lueneburgensis (Freyer, 1848)
- Aporophyla nigra (Haworth, 1809)
- Apterogenum ypsillon (Denis & Schiffermuller, 1775)
- Archanara dissoluta (Treitschke, 1825)
- Asteroscopus sphinx (Hufnagel, 1766)
- Atethmia algirica (Culot, 1917)
- Atethmia centrago (Haworth, 1809)
- Athetis pallustris (Hübner, 1808)
- Athetis hospes (Freyer, 1831)
- Atypha pulmonaris (Esper, 1790)
- Auchmis detersa (Esper, 1787)
- Autographa aemula (Denis & Schiffermuller, 1775)
- Autographa bractea (Denis & Schiffermuller, 1775)
- Autographa gamma (Linnaeus, 1758)
- Autographa jota (Linnaeus, 1758)
- Autographa pulchrina (Haworth, 1809)
- Axylia putris (Linnaeus, 1761)
- Brachygalea albolineata (Blachier, 1905)
- Brachylomia viminalis (Fabricius, 1776)
- Brithys crini (Fabricius, 1775)
- Bryonycta pineti (Staudinger, 1859)
- Bryophila ereptricula Treitschke, 1825
- Bryophila gea (Schawerda, 1934)
- Bryophila raptricula (Denis & Schiffermuller, 1775)
- Bryophila ravula (Hübner, 1813)
- Bryophila vandalusiae Duponchel, 1842
- Bryophila domestica (Hufnagel, 1766)
- Bryophila microglossa (Rambur, 1858)
- Bryophila petrea Guenee, 1852
- Calamia tridens (Hufnagel, 1766)
- Callopistria juventina (Stoll, 1782)
- Callopistria latreillei (Duponchel, 1827)
- Calophasia almoravida Graslin, 1863
- Calophasia hamifera Staudinger, 1863
- Calophasia lunula (Hufnagel, 1766)
- Calophasia opalina (Esper, 1793)
- Calophasia platyptera (Esper, 1788)
- Caradrina germainii (Duponchel, 1835)
- Caradrina morpheus (Hufnagel, 1766)
- Caradrina armeniaca (Boursin, 1936)
- Caradrina distigma (Chretien, 1913)
- Caradrina flava Oberthür, 1876
- Caradrina ibeasi (Fernandez, 1918)
- Caradrina ingrata Staudinger, 1897
- Caradrina clavipalpis Scopoli, 1763
- Caradrina flavirena Guenee, 1852
- Caradrina fuscicornis Rambur, 1832
- Caradrina noctivaga Bellier, 1863
- Caradrina selini Boisduval, 1840
- Caradrina wullschlegeli Pungeler, 1903
- Caradrina aspersa Rambur, 1834
- Caradrina kadenii Freyer, 1836
- Caradrina proxima Rambur, 1837
- Caradrina terrea Freyer, 1840
- Cardepia affinis (Rothschild, 1913)
- Cardepia sociabilis (de Graslin, 1850)
- Ceramica pisi (Linnaeus, 1758)
- Cerapteryx graminis (Linnaeus, 1758)
- Cerastis faceta (Treitschke, 1835)
- Cerastis rubricosa (Denis & Schiffermuller, 1775)
- Charanyca trigrammica (Hufnagel, 1766)
- Charanyca ferruginea (Esper, 1785)
- Chersotis alpestris (Boisduval, 1837)
- Chersotis anatolica (Draudt, 1936)
- Chersotis cuprea (Denis & Schiffermuller, 1775)
- Chersotis elegans (Eversmann, 1837)
- Chersotis fimbriola (Esper, 1803)
- Chersotis larixia (Guenee, 1852)
- Chersotis margaritacea (Villers, 1789)
- Chersotis multangula (Hübner, 1803)
- Chersotis ocellina (Denis & Schiffermuller, 1775)
- Chersotis oreina Dufay, 1984
- Chilodes maritima (Tauscher, 1806)
- Chloantha hyperici (Denis & Schiffermuller, 1775)
- Chrysodeixis chalcites (Esper, 1789)
- Cleoceris scoriacea (Esper, 1789)
- Cleonymia baetica (Rambur, 1837)
- Cleonymia diffluens (Staudinger, 1870)
- Cleonymia korbi (Staudinger, 1895)
- Cleonymia pectinicornis (Staudinger, 1859)
- Cleonymia yvanii (Duponchel, 1833)
- Coenobia rufa (Haworth, 1809)
- Colocasia coryli (Linnaeus, 1758)
- Condica viscosa (Freyer, 1831)
- Conisania renati (Oberthür, 1890)
- Conisania andalusica (Staudinger, 1859)
- Conistra alicia Lajonquiere, 1939
- Conistra daubei (Duponchel, 1838)
- Conistra gallica (Lederer, 1857)
- Conistra haleae Fibiger & Top-Jensen, 2010
- Conistra intricata (Boisduval, 1829)
- Conistra ligula (Esper, 1791)
- Conistra rubiginosa (Scopoli, 1763)
- Conistra vaccinii (Linnaeus, 1761)
- Conistra erythrocephala (Denis & Schiffermuller, 1775)
- Conistra rubiginea (Denis & Schiffermuller, 1775)
- Conistra staudingeri (Graslin, 1863)
- Conistra torrida (Lederer, 1857)
- Coranarta restricta Yela, 2002
- Cosmia trapezina (Linnaeus, 1758)
- Cosmia diffinis (Linnaeus, 1767)
- Cosmia pyralina (Denis & Schiffermuller, 1775)
- Cosmia affinis (Linnaeus, 1767)
- Craniophora ligustri (Denis & Schiffermuller, 1775)
- Craniophora pontica (Staudinger, 1878)
- Cryphia fraudatricula (Hübner, 1803)
- Cryphia lusitanica (Draudt, 1931)
- Cryphia simulatricula (Guenee, 1852)
- Cryphia algae (Fabricius, 1775)
- Cryphia ochsi (Boursin, 1940)
- Cryphia pallida (Baker, 1894)
- Ctenoplusia accentifera (Lefebvre, 1827)
- Ctenoplusia limbirena (Guenee, 1852)
- Cucullia absinthii (Linnaeus, 1761)
- Cucullia achilleae Guenee, 1852
- Cucullia argentea (Hufnagel, 1766)
- Cucullia artemisiae (Hufnagel, 1766)
- Cucullia asteris (Denis & Schiffermuller, 1775)
- Cucullia bubaceki Kitt, 1925
- Cucullia calendulae Treitschke, 1835
- Cucullia campanulae Freyer, 1831
- Cucullia cemenelensis Boursin, 1923
- Cucullia chamomillae (Denis & Schiffermuller, 1775)
- Cucullia dracunculi (Hübner, 1813)
- Cucullia gnaphalii (Hübner, 1813)
- Cucullia lactucae (Denis & Schiffermuller, 1775)
- Cucullia lucifuga (Denis & Schiffermuller, 1775)
- Cucullia santolinae Rambur, 1834
- Cucullia tanaceti (Denis & Schiffermuller, 1775)
- Cucullia umbratica (Linnaeus, 1758)
- Cucullia xeranthemi Boisduval, 1840
- Cucullia caninae Rambur, 1833
- Cucullia erythrocephala Wagner, 1914
- Cucullia lanceolata (Villers, 1789)
- Cucullia lychnitis Rambur, 1833
- Cucullia reisseri Boursin, 1933
- Cucullia scrophulariae (Denis & Schiffermuller, 1775)
- Cucullia scrophulariphila Staudinger, 1859
- Cucullia verbasci (Linnaeus, 1758)
- Dasypolia templi (Thunberg, 1792)
- Deltote bankiana (Fabricius, 1775)
- Deltote pygarga (Hufnagel, 1766)
- Denticucullus mabillei (D. Lucas, 1907)
- Denticucullus pygmina (Haworth, 1809)
- Diachrysia chrysitis (Linnaeus, 1758)
- Diachrysia chryson (Esper, 1789)
- Diachrysia nadeja (Oberthür, 1880)
- Diachrysia stenochrysis (Warren, 1913)
- Diarsia brunnea (Denis & Schiffermuller, 1775)
- Diarsia florida (F. Schmidt, 1859)
- Diarsia guadarramensis (Boursin, 1928)
- Diarsia mendica (Fabricius, 1775)
- Diarsia rubi (Vieweg, 1790)
- Dichagyris flammatra (Denis & Schiffermuller, 1775)
- Dichagyris musiva (Hübner, 1803)
- Dichagyris candelisequa (Denis & Schiffermuller, 1775)
- Dichagyris constanti (Milliere, 1860)
- Dichagyris fidelis (de Joannis, 1903)
- Dichagyris forcipula (Denis & Schiffermuller, 1775)
- Dichagyris imperator (A. Bang-Haas, 1912)
- Dichagyris nigrescens (Hofner, 1888)
- Dichagyris renigera (Hübner, 1808)
- Dichagyris romanovi (Christoph, 1885)
- Dichagyris signifera (Denis & Schiffermuller, 1775)
- Dichagyris mansoura (Chretien, 1911)
- Dichonia aeruginea (Hübner, 1808)
- Dichonia convergens (Denis & Schiffermuller, 1775)
- Dicycla oo (Linnaeus, 1758)
- Diloba caeruleocephala (Linnaeus, 1758)
- Dryobota labecula (Esper, 1788)
- Dryobotodes tenebrosa (Esper, 1789)
- Dryobotodes eremita (Fabricius, 1775)
- Dryobotodes monochroma (Esper, 1790)
- Dryobotodes roboris (Geyer, 1835)
- Dypterygia scabriuscula (Linnaeus, 1758)
- Egira conspicillaris (Linnaeus, 1758)
- Elaphria venustula (Hübner, 1790)
- Enargia abluta (Hübner, 1808)
- Enargia paleacea (Esper, 1788)
- Enterpia laudeti (Boisduval, 1840)
- Epilecta linogrisea (Denis & Schiffermuller, 1775)
- Epimecia ustula (Freyer, 1835)
- Epipsilia cervantes (Reisser, 1935)
- Epipsilia grisescens (Fabricius, 1794)
- Epipsilia latens (Hübner, 1809)
- Episema glaucina (Esper, 1789)
- Episema grueneri Boisduval, 1837
- Eremobia ochroleuca (Denis & Schiffermuller, 1775)
- Eremohadena chenopodiphaga (Rambur, 1832)
- Eremohadena halimi (Milliere, 1877)
- Eremohadena roseonitens (Oberthür, 1887)
- Eremohadena mariana (Lajonquiere, 1964)
- Eremopola orana (H. Lucas, 1848)
- Eremopola lenis (Staudinger, 1892)
- Eucarta amethystina (Hübner, 1803)
- Euchalcia modestoides Poole, 1989
- Euchalcia variabilis (Piller, 1783)
- Eucoptocnemis optabilis (Boisduval, 1834)
- Eugnorisma glareosa (Esper, 1788)
- Eugnorisma arenoflavida (Schawerda, 1934)
- Eugnorisma depuncta (Linnaeus, 1761)
- Euplexia lucipara (Linnaeus, 1758)
- Eupsilia transversa (Hufnagel, 1766)
- Eurois occulta (Linnaeus, 1758)
- Euxoa aquilina (Denis & Schiffermuller, 1775)
- Euxoa canariensis Rebel, 1902
- Euxoa conspicua (Hübner, 1824)
- Euxoa cos (Hübner, 1824)
- Euxoa culminicola (Staudinger, 1870)
- Euxoa decora (Denis & Schiffermuller, 1775)
- Euxoa eruta (Hübner, 1817)
- Euxoa hastifera (Donzel, 1847)
- Euxoa mendelis Fernandez, 1915
- Euxoa nigricans (Linnaeus, 1761)
- Euxoa nigrofusca (Esper, 1788)
- Euxoa obelisca (Denis & Schiffermuller, 1775)
- Euxoa oranaria (A. Bang-Haas, 1906)
- Euxoa powelli (Oberthür, 1912)
- Euxoa recussa (Hübner, 1817)
- Euxoa temera (Hübner, 1808)
- Euxoa tritici (Linnaeus, 1761)
- Euxoa vitta (Esper, 1789)
- Euxoa wagneri Corti, 1926
- Euxoa continentalis Reisser, 1935
- Euxoa nevadensis Corti, 1928
- Evisa schawerdae Reisser, 1930
- Galgula partita Guenee, 1852
- Globia algae (Esper, 1789)
- Globia sparganii (Esper, 1790)
- Gortyna borelii Pierret, 1837
- Gortyna flavago (Denis & Schiffermuller, 1775)
- Gortyna puengeleri (Turati, 1909)
- Gortyna xanthenes Germar, 1842
- Graphiphora augur (Fabricius, 1775)
- Griposia aprilina (Linnaeus, 1758)
- Hada plebeja (Linnaeus, 1761)
- Hadena irregularis (Hufnagel, 1766)
- Hadena nevadae (Draudt, 1933)
- Hadena perplexa (Denis & Schiffermuller, 1775)
- Hadena ruetimeyeri Boursin, 1951
- Hadena sancta (Staudinger, 1859)
- Hadena silenes (Hübner, 1822)
- Hadena albimacula (Borkhausen, 1792)
- Hadena archaica Hacker, 1996
- Hadena bicruris (Hufnagel, 1766)
- Hadena caesia (Denis & Schiffermuller, 1775)
- Hadena clara (Staudinger, 1901)
- Hadena compta (Denis & Schiffermuller, 1775)
- Hadena confusa (Hufnagel, 1766)
- Hadena consparcatoides (Schawerda, 1928)
- Hadena filograna (Esper, 1788)
- Hadena luteocincta (Rambur, 1834)
- Hadena magnolii (Boisduval, 1829)
- Hadena orihuela Hacker, 1996
- Hadena vulcanica (Turati, 1907)
- Hadena wehrlii (Draudt, 1934)
- Hadena tephroleuca (Boisduval, 1833)
- Hadena silenides (Staudinger, 1895)
- Hadjina wichti (Hirschke, 1903)
- Haemerosia renalis (Hübner, 1813)
- Harpagophana hilaris (Staudinger, 1895)
- Hecatera bicolorata (Hufnagel, 1766)
- Hecatera cappa (Hübner, 1809)
- Hecatera dysodea (Denis & Schiffermuller, 1775)
- Hecatera weissi (Draudt, 1934)
- Helicoverpa armigera (Hübner, 1808)
- Heliothis incarnata Freyer, 1838
- Heliothis maritima Graslin, 1855
- Heliothis nubigera Herrich-Schäffer, 1851
- Heliothis peltigera (Denis & Schiffermuller, 1775)
- Heliothis viriplaca (Hufnagel, 1766)
- Helotropha leucostigma (Hübner, 1808)
- Heterophysa dumetorum (Geyer, 1834)
- Hoplodrina ambigua (Denis & Schiffermuller, 1775)
- Hoplodrina blanda (Denis & Schiffermuller, 1775)
- Hoplodrina hesperica Dufay & Boursin, 1960
- Hoplodrina octogenaria (Goeze, 1781)
- Hoplodrina respersa (Denis & Schiffermuller, 1775)
- Hoplodrina superstes (Ochsenheimer, 1816)
- Hydraecia micacea (Esper, 1789)
- Hydraecia osseola Staudinger, 1882
- Hyppa rectilinea (Esper, 1788)
- Ipimorpha retusa (Linnaeus, 1761)
- Ipimorpha subtusa (Denis & Schiffermuller, 1775)
- Jodia croceago (Denis & Schiffermuller, 1775)
- Lacanobia contigua (Denis & Schiffermuller, 1775)
- Lacanobia suasa (Denis & Schiffermuller, 1775)
- Lacanobia thalassina (Hufnagel, 1766)
- Lacanobia aliena (Hübner, 1809)
- Lacanobia blenna (Hübner, 1824)
- Lacanobia oleracea (Linnaeus, 1758)
- Lacanobia splendens (Hübner, 1808)
- Lacanobia w-latinum (Hufnagel, 1766)
- Lamprosticta culta (Denis & Schiffermuller, 1775)
- Lasionycta imbecilla (Fabricius, 1794)
- Lasionycta proxima (Hübner, 1809)
- Lateroligia ophiogramma (Esper, 1794)
- Lenisa geminipuncta (Haworth, 1809)
- Leucania loreyi (Duponchel, 1827)
- Leucania comma (Linnaeus, 1761)
- Leucania joannisi Boursin & Rungs, 1952
- Leucania obsoleta (Hübner, 1803)
- Leucania punctosa (Treitschke, 1825)
- Leucania putrescens (Hübner, 1824)
- Leucania zeae (Duponchel, 1827)
- Leucochlaena oditis (Hübner, 1822)
- Lithophane furcifera (Hufnagel, 1766)
- Lithophane merckii (Rambur, 1832)
- Lithophane ornitopus (Hufnagel, 1766)
- Lithophane semibrunnea (Haworth, 1809)
- Lithophane socia (Hufnagel, 1766)
- Lithophane leautieri (Boisduval, 1829)
- Litoligia literosa (Haworth, 1809)
- Lophoterges millierei (Staudinger, 1871)
- Luperina dumerilii (Duponchel, 1826)
- Luperina nickerlii (Freyer, 1845)
- Luperina testacea (Denis & Schiffermuller, 1775)
- Lycophotia erythrina (Herrich-Schäffer, 1852)
- Lycophotia molothina (Esper, 1789)
- Lycophotia porphyrea (Denis & Schiffermuller, 1775)
- Macdunnoughia confusa (Stephens, 1850)
- Mamestra brassicae (Linnaeus, 1758)
- Meganephria bimaculosa (Linnaeus, 1767)
- Melanchra persicariae (Linnaeus, 1761)
- Mesapamea remmi Rezbanyai-Reser, 1985
- Mesapamea secalella Remm, 1983
- Mesapamea secalis (Linnaeus, 1758)
- Mesogona acetosellae (Denis & Schiffermuller, 1775)
- Mesogona oxalina (Hübner, 1803)
- Mesoligia furuncula (Denis & Schiffermuller, 1775)
- Metopoceras felicina (Donzel, 1844)
- Metopoceras tabernas Fibiger, Yela, Zilli & Ronkay, 2010
- Metopoceras albarracina Hampson, 1918
- Metopoceras khalildja Oberthür, 1884
- Mniotype adusta (Esper, 1790)
- Mniotype fulva (Rothschild, 1914)
- Mniotype occidentalis Yela, Fibiger, Ronkay & Zilli, 2010
- Mniotype satura (Denis & Schiffermuller, 1775)
- Moma alpium (Osbeck, 1778)
- Mormo maura (Linnaeus, 1758)
- Mythimna riparia (Rambur, 1829)
- Mythimna albipuncta (Denis & Schiffermuller, 1775)
- Mythimna algirica (Oberthür, 1918)
- Mythimna congrua (Hübner, 1817)
- Mythimna ferrago (Fabricius, 1787)
- Mythimna l-album (Linnaeus, 1767)
- Mythimna litoralis (Curtis, 1827)
- Mythimna umbrigera (Saalmuller, 1891)
- Mythimna languida (Walker, 1858)
- Mythimna conigera (Denis & Schiffermuller, 1775)
- Mythimna impura (Hübner, 1808)
- Mythimna pallens (Linnaeus, 1758)
- Mythimna pudorina (Denis & Schiffermuller, 1775)
- Mythimna straminea (Treitschke, 1825)
- Mythimna turca (Linnaeus, 1761)
- Mythimna vitellina (Hübner, 1808)
- Mythimna prominens (Walker, 1856)
- Mythimna unipuncta (Haworth, 1809)
- Mythimna andereggii (Boisduval, 1840)
- Mythimna sicula (Treitschke, 1835)
- Naenia typica (Linnaeus, 1758)
- Noctua comes Hübner, 1813
- Noctua fimbriata (Schreber, 1759)
- Noctua interjecta Hübner, 1803
- Noctua interposita (Hübner, 1790)
- Noctua janthe (Borkhausen, 1792)
- Noctua janthina Denis & Schiffermuller, 1775
- Noctua orbona (Hufnagel, 1766)
- Noctua pronuba (Linnaeus, 1758)
- Noctua tirrenica Biebinger, Speidel & Hanigk, 1983
- Nonagria typhae (Thunberg, 1784)
- Nyctobrya muralis (Forster, 1771)
- Ochropleura leucogaster (Freyer, 1831)
- Ochropleura plecta (Linnaeus, 1761)
- Oligia fasciuncula (Haworth, 1809)
- Oligia latruncula (Denis & Schiffermuller, 1775)
- Oligia strigilis (Linnaeus, 1758)
- Oligia versicolor (Borkhausen, 1792)
- Olivenebula xanthochloris (Boisduval, 1840)
- Omia banghaasi Stauder, 1930
- Omia cyclopea (Graslin, 1837)
- Omia cymbalariae (Hübner, 1809)
- Omphalophana antirrhinii (Hübner, 1803)
- Omphalophana serrata (Treitschke, 1835)
- Oncocnemis nigricula (Eversmann, 1847)
- Opigena polygona (Denis & Schiffermuller, 1775)
- Oria musculosa (Hübner, 1808)
- Orthosia gracilis (Denis & Schiffermuller, 1775)
- Orthosia opima (Hübner, 1809)
- Orthosia cerasi (Fabricius, 1775)
- Orthosia cruda (Denis & Schiffermuller, 1775)
- Orthosia miniosa (Denis & Schiffermuller, 1775)
- Orthosia populeti (Fabricius, 1775)
- Orthosia incerta (Hufnagel, 1766)
- Orthosia gothica (Linnaeus, 1758)
- Oxicesta serratae (Zerny, 1927)
- Oxytripia orbiculosa (Esper, 1799)
- Pachetra sagittigera (Hufnagel, 1766)
- Panchrysia aurea (Hübner, 1803)
- Panchrysia v-argenteum (Esper, 1798)
- Panemeria tenebrata (Scopoli, 1763)
- Panolis flammea (Denis & Schiffermuller, 1775)
- Papestra biren (Goeze, 1781)
- Parastichtis suspecta (Hübner, 1817)
- Pardoxia graellsi (Feisthamel, 1837)
- Peridroma saucia (Hübner, 1808)
- Perigrapha rorida Frivaldszky, 1835
- Periphanes delphinii (Linnaeus, 1758)
- Phlogophora meticulosa (Linnaeus, 1758)
- Photedes captiuncula (Treitschke, 1825)
- Photedes dulcis (Oberthür, 1918)
- Photedes minima (Haworth, 1809)
- Photedes morrisii (Dale, 1837)
- Phyllophila obliterata (Rambur, 1833)
- Plusia festucae (Linnaeus, 1758)
- Polia bombycina (Hufnagel, 1766)
- Polia hepatica (Clerck, 1759)
- Polia nebulosa (Hufnagel, 1766)
- Polychrysia moneta (Fabricius, 1787)
- Polymixis lichenea (Hübner, 1813)
- Polymixis argillaceago (Hübner, 1822)
- Polymixis dubia (Duponchel, 1836)
- Polymixis flavicincta (Denis & Schiffermuller, 1775)
- Polymixis germana (Rothschild, 1914)
- Polymixis xanthomista (Hübner, 1819)
- Polyphaenis sericata (Esper, 1787)
- Protolampra sobrina (Duponchel, 1843)
- Protoschinia scutosa (Denis & Schiffermuller, 1775)
- Pseudenargia ulicis (Staudinger, 1859)
- Pseudozarba bipartita (Herrich-Schäffer, 1850)
- Pyrrhia umbra (Hufnagel, 1766)
- Raphia hybris (Hübner, 1813)
- Recoropha canteneri (Duponchel, 1833)
- Rhiza commoda Staudinger, 1889
- Rhizedra lutosa (Hübner, 1803)
- Rhyacia helvetina (Boisduval, 1833)
- Rhyacia lucipeta (Denis & Schiffermuller, 1775)
- Rhyacia simulans (Hufnagel, 1766)
- Saragossa seeboldi Staudinger, 1900
- Schinia cardui (Hübner, 1790)
- Scotochrosta pulla (Denis & Schiffermuller, 1775)
- Sesamia cretica Lederer, 1857
- Sesamia nonagrioides Lefebvre, 1827
- Sideridis rivularis (Fabricius, 1775)
- Sideridis implexa (Hübner, 1809)
- Sideridis reticulata (Goeze, 1781)
- Sideridis turbida (Esper, 1790)
- Simyra albovenosa (Goeze, 1781)
- Spaelotis ravida (Denis & Schiffermuller, 1775)
- Spaelotis senna (Freyer, 1829)
- Spodoptera cilium Guenee, 1852
- Spodoptera exigua (Hübner, 1808)
- Spodoptera littoralis (Boisduval, 1833)
- Standfussiana dalmata (Staudinger, 1901)
- Standfussiana lucernea (Linnaeus, 1758)
- Stilbia andalusiaca Staudinger, 1892
- Stilbia anomala (Haworth, 1812)
- Stilbia philopalis Graslin, 1852
- Subacronicta megacephala (Denis & Schiffermuller, 1775)
- Syngrapha interrogationis (Linnaeus, 1758)
- Synthymia fixa (Fabricius, 1787)
- Teinoptera olivina (Herrich-Schäffer, 1852)
- Thalerastria lehmanni Hoppe & Fibiger, 2009
- Thalpophila matura (Hufnagel, 1766)
- Thalpophila vitalba (Freyer, 1834)
- Tholera cespitis (Denis & Schiffermuller, 1775)
- Tholera decimalis (Poda, 1761)
- Thysanoplusia daubei (Boisduval, 1840)
- Thysanoplusia orichalcea (Fabricius, 1775)
- Tiliacea aurago (Denis & Schiffermuller, 1775)
- Tiliacea citrago (Linnaeus, 1758)
- Tiliacea sulphurago (Denis & Schiffermuller, 1775)
- Trachea atriplicis (Linnaeus, 1758)
- Trichoplusia ni (Hübner, 1803)
- Trichosea ludifica (Linnaeus, 1758)
- Trigonophora haasi (Staudinger, 1892)
- Trigonophora crassicornis (Oberthür, 1918)
- Trigonophora flammea (Esper, 1785)
- Trigonophora jodea (Herrich-Schäffer, 1850)
- Tyta luctuosa (Denis & Schiffermuller, 1775)
- Unchelea myodea (Rambur, 1858)
- Valeria jaspidea (Villers, 1789)
- Victrix agenjoi (Fernandez, 1931)
- Xanthia austauti Oberthür, 1881
- Xanthia gilvago (Denis & Schiffermuller, 1775)
- Xanthia icteritia (Hufnagel, 1766)
- Xanthia ocellaris (Borkhausen, 1792)
- Xanthia ruticilla (Esper, 1791)
- Xanthia togata (Esper, 1788)
- Xanthodes albago (Fabricius, 1794)
- Xestia ashworthii (Doubleday, 1855)
- Xestia c-nigrum (Linnaeus, 1758)
- Xestia ditrapezium (Denis & Schiffermuller, 1775)
- Xestia triangulum (Hufnagel, 1766)
- Xestia agathina (Duponchel, 1827)
- Xestia baja (Denis & Schiffermuller, 1775)
- Xestia castanea (Esper, 1798)
- Xestia kermesina (Mabille, 1869)
- Xestia ochreago (Hübner, 1809)
- Xestia sexstrigata (Haworth, 1809)
- Xestia stigmatica (Hübner, 1813)
- Xestia trifida (Fischer v. Waldheim, 1820)
- Xestia xanthographa (Denis & Schiffermuller, 1775)
- Xylena buckwelli Rungs, 1952
- Xylena exsoleta (Linnaeus, 1758)
- Xylena vetusta (Hübner, 1813)
- Xylocampa areola (Esper, 1789)

== Nolidae ==
- Bena bicolorana (Fuessly, 1775)
- Earias clorana (Linnaeus, 1761)
- Earias insulana (Boisduval, 1833)
- Earias vernana (Fabricius, 1787)
- Garella nilotica (Rogenhofer, 1882)
- Meganola albula (Denis & Schiffermuller, 1775)
- Meganola strigula (Denis & Schiffermuller, 1775)
- Meganola togatulalis (Hübner, 1796)
- Nola aerugula (Hübner, 1793)
- Nola chlamitulalis (Hübner, 1813)
- Nola cicatricalis (Treitschke, 1835)
- Nola confusalis (Herrich-Schäffer, 1847)
- Nola cristatula (Hübner, 1793)
- Nola cucullatella (Linnaeus, 1758)
- Nola squalida Staudinger, 1871
- Nola subchlamydula Staudinger, 1871
- Nola thymula Milliere, 1867
- Nola tutulella Zerny, 1927
- Nycteola asiatica (Krulikovsky, 1904)
- Nycteola columbana (Turner, 1925)
- Nycteola degenerana (Hübner, 1799)
- Nycteola revayana (Scopoli, 1772)
- Nycteola siculana (Fuchs, 1899)
- Pseudoips prasinana (Linnaeus, 1758)

== Notodontidae ==
- Cerura erminea (Esper, 1783)
- Cerura iberica (Templado & Ortiz, 1966)
- Cerura vinula (Linnaeus, 1758)
- Clostera anachoreta (Denis & Schiffermuller, 1775)
- Clostera curtula (Linnaeus, 1758)
- Clostera pigra (Hufnagel, 1766)
- Dicranura ulmi (Denis & Schiffermuller, 1775)
- Drymonia dodonaea (Denis & Schiffermuller, 1775)
- Drymonia obliterata (Esper, 1785)
- Drymonia querna (Denis & Schiffermuller, 1775)
- Drymonia ruficornis (Hufnagel, 1766)
- Drymonia velitaris (Hufnagel, 1766)
- Furcula bicuspis (Borkhausen, 1790)
- Furcula bifida (Brahm, 1787)
- Furcula furcula (Clerck, 1759)
- Gluphisia crenata (Esper, 1785)
- Harpyia milhauseri (Fabricius, 1775)
- Neoharpyia verbasci (Fabricius, 1798)
- Notodonta dromedarius (Linnaeus, 1767)
- Notodonta tritophus (Denis & Schiffermuller, 1775)
- Notodonta ziczac (Linnaeus, 1758)
- Odontosia carmelita (Esper, 1799)
- Peridea anceps (Goeze, 1781)
- Phalera bucephala (Linnaeus, 1758)
- Phalera bucephaloides (Ochsenheimer, 1810)
- Pheosia gnoma (Fabricius, 1776)
- Pheosia tremula (Clerck, 1759)
- Pterostoma palpina (Clerck, 1759)
- Ptilodon capucina (Linnaeus, 1758)
- Ptilodon cucullina (Denis & Schiffermuller, 1775)
- Ptilophora plumigera (Denis & Schiffermuller, 1775)
- Rhegmatophila alpina (Bellier, 1881)
- Spatalia argentina (Denis & Schiffermuller, 1775)
- Stauropus fagi (Linnaeus, 1758)
- Thaumetopoea herculeana (Rambur, 1840)
- Thaumetopoea pinivora (Treitschke, 1834)
- Thaumetopoea pityocampa (Denis & Schiffermuller, 1775)
- Thaumetopoea processionea (Linnaeus, 1758)

== Oecophoridae ==
- Alabonia chapmani Walsingham, 1903
- Alabonia herculeella Walsingham, 1903
- Alabonia staintoniella (Zeller, 1850)
- Aplota palpella (Haworth, 1828)
- Batia lambdella (Donovan, 1793)
- Batia lunaris (Haworth, 1828)
- Bisigna procerella (Denis & Schiffermuller, 1775)
- Borkhausenia gredoensis Rebel, 1937
- Borkhausenia minutella (Linnaeus, 1758)
- Borkhausenia nefrax Hodges, 1974
- Borkhausenia predotai Hartig, 1936
- Crassa unitella (Hübner, 1796)
- Dasycera oliviella (Fabricius, 1794)
- Decantha iagathella (Walsingham, 1903)
- Decantha luquetiella Vives, 1986
- Denisia aragonella (Chretien, 1903)
- Denisia augustella (Hübner, 1796)
- Denisia fiduciella (Rebel, 1935)
- Denisia subaquilea (Stainton, 1849)
- Endrosis sarcitrella (Linnaeus, 1758)
- Epicallima formosella (Denis & Schiffermuller, 1775)
- Epicallima mercedella (Staudinger, 1859)
- Epicallima mikkolai (Lvovsky, 1995)
- Esperia sulphurella (Fabricius, 1775)
- Goidanichiana jourdheuillella (Ragonot, 1875)
- Harpella forficella (Scopoli, 1763)
- Herrichia excelsella Staudinger, 1871
- Hofmannophila pseudospretella (Stainton, 1849)
- Kasyniana griseosericeella (Ragonot, 1879)
- Kasyniana indistinctella (Rebel, 1902)
- Minetia crinitus (Fabricius, 1798)
- Oecophora bractella (Linnaeus, 1758)
- Pleurota albarracina Rebel, 1917
- Pleurota amaurodoxa Meyrick, 1935
- Pleurota aristella (Linnaeus, 1767)
- Pleurota bicostella (Clerck, 1759)
- Pleurota ericella (Duponchel, 1839)
- Pleurota eximia Lederer, 1861
- Pleurota gallicella Huemer & Luquet, 1995
- Pleurota hebetella Ragonot, 1889
- Pleurota honorella (Hübner, 1813)
- Pleurota nobilella Rebel, 1900
- Pleurota planella (Staudinger, 1859)
- Pleurota protasella Staudinger, 1883
- Pleurota proteella Staudinger, 1880
- Pleurota pungitiella Herrich-Schäffer, 1854
- Pleurota pyropella (Denis & Schiffermuller, 1775)
- Pleurota sobriella (Staudinger, 1859)
- Pleurota teligerella (Staudinger, 1859)
- Pleurota glitzella (Staudinger, 1883)
- Pleurota pleurotella (Staudinger, 1871)
- Pleurota punctella (O. Costa, 1836)
- Pseudocryptolechia sareptensis (Moschler, 1862)
- Schiffermuelleria schaefferella (Linnaeus, 1758)

== Opostegidae ==
- Opostega salaciella (Treitschke, 1833)
- Opostega spatulella Herrich-Schäffer, 1855
- Opostegoides menthinella (Mann, 1855)
- Pseudopostega chalcopepla (Walsingham, 1908)
- Pseudopostega crepusculella (Zeller, 1839)

== See also ==
- List of Iberian butterflies
