= Trifurcula anthyllidella =

Scientific classification
- Kingdom: Animalia
- Phylum: Arthropoda
- Clade: Pancrustacea
- Class: Insecta
- Order: Lepidoptera
- Family: Nepticulidae
- Genus: Trifurcula
- Species: T. anthyllidella

Binomial name
- Trifurcula anthyllidella Klimesch, 1975

Species of moth

Trifurcula anthyllidella is a moth of the family Nepticulidae. It is found in Spain, on Mallorca and along the south and east coast from Cádiz to Girona on limestone, up into the mountains.

The wingspan is 5.6–7.4 mm for males and 5.6–7.1 mm for females.

The larvae feed on Anthyllis cytisoides and Anthyllis terniflora. They mine the leaves of their host plant.
