= Trifurcula puplesisi =

Scientific classification
- Kingdom: Animalia
- Phylum: Arthropoda
- Clade: Pancrustacea
- Class: Insecta
- Order: Lepidoptera
- Family: Nepticulidae
- Genus: Trifurcula
- Species: T. puplesisi

Binomial name
- Trifurcula puplesisi van Nieukerken, 1990

Species of moth

Trifurcula puplesisi is a moth of the family Nepticulidae. It is known from the Caspian Sea area in Europe and southern Turkmenistan

The wingspan is 6.2–8 mm for males and about 7.3 mm for females. Adults were found in a steppe, almost desert, area in May, June and July.
