= Trifurcula austriaca =

Scientific classification
- Kingdom: Animalia
- Phylum: Arthropoda
- Clade: Pancrustacea
- Class: Insecta
- Order: Lepidoptera
- Family: Nepticulidae
- Genus: Trifurcula
- Species: T. austriaca

Binomial name
- Trifurcula austriaca van Nieukerken, 1990

Species of moth

Trifurcula austriaca is a moth of the family Nepticulidae. It is found in Austria, the Czech Republic and Slovakia. It has also been reported from Greece.

The wingspan is 5.6-6.7 mm for males. Adults were found from May to September in a grassland nature reserve.
