= Trifurcula albiflorella =

Scientific classification
- Kingdom: Animalia
- Phylum: Arthropoda
- Clade: Pancrustacea
- Class: Insecta
- Order: Lepidoptera
- Family: Nepticulidae
- Genus: Trifurcula
- Species: T. albiflorella

Binomial name
- Trifurcula albiflorella Klimesch, 1978

Synonyms
- Glaucolepis albiflorella Klimesch, 1978

Species of moth

Trifurcula albiflorella is a moth of the family Nepticulidae. It is found in Greece and Turkey.

The wingspan is 4.25–5 mm.

The larvae feed on Nepeta nuda albiflora. They mine the leaves of their host plant.
