= Trifurcula globulariae =

Scientific classification
- Kingdom: Animalia
- Phylum: Arthropoda
- Clade: Pancrustacea
- Class: Insecta
- Order: Lepidoptera
- Family: Nepticulidae
- Genus: Trifurcula
- Species: T. globulariae

Binomial name
- Trifurcula globulariae Klimesch, 1975

Species of moth

Trifurcula globulariae is a moth of the family Nepticulidae. First described by Klimesch in 1975, it is only known from North Macedonia.

The larvae feed on Globularia meridionalis. They mine the leaves of their host plant.
