= Trifurcula victoris =

Scientific classification
- Kingdom: Animalia
- Phylum: Arthropoda
- Clade: Pancrustacea
- Class: Insecta
- Order: Lepidoptera
- Family: Nepticulidae
- Genus: Trifurcula
- Species: T. victoris

Binomial name
- Trifurcula victoris van Nieukerken, 1990

Species of moth

Trifurcula victoris is a moth of the family Nepticulidae. It is only known from the extremely dry region in the southeast part of the Province of Almería in Spain.

The wingspan is 6.5-7.2 mm for males and 6.5–7 mm for females.

The larvae feed on Anthyllis cytisoides. The larvae were found in January and adults emerged from February to May.
