= Trifurcula salicinae =

Scientific classification
- Kingdom: Animalia
- Phylum: Arthropoda
- Clade: Pancrustacea
- Class: Insecta
- Order: Lepidoptera
- Family: Nepticulidae
- Genus: Trifurcula
- Species: T. salicinae

Binomial name
- Trifurcula salicinae Klimesch, 1975

Species of moth

Trifurcula salicinae is a moth of the family Nepticulidae. It is endemic to the Canary Islands.

The larvae feed on Globularia salicina. They mine the leaves of their host plant.
