= Trifurcula peloponnesica =

Scientific classification
- Kingdom: Animalia
- Phylum: Arthropoda
- Clade: Pancrustacea
- Class: Insecta
- Order: Lepidoptera
- Family: Nepticulidae
- Genus: Trifurcula
- Species: T. peloponnesica

Binomial name
- Trifurcula peloponnesica van Nieukerken, 2007

Species of moth

Trifurcula peloponnesica is a moth of the family Nepticulidae. Up to now only known with certainty from Peloponnesus in Greece. In Corsica, mines have been found that could very well belong to this species.

The wingspan is 4.6–5.7 mm for males and 4.9–5.3 mm for females.

The larvae feed on Anthyllis hermanniae. They mine the leaves of their host plant.
