= Trifurcula luteola =

Scientific classification
- Kingdom: Animalia
- Phylum: Arthropoda
- Clade: Pancrustacea
- Class: Insecta
- Order: Lepidoptera
- Family: Nepticulidae
- Genus: Trifurcula
- Species: T. luteola

Binomial name
- Trifurcula luteola van Nieukerken, 1990

Species of moth

Trifurcula luteola is a moth of the family Nepticulidae. It is known from the Mediterranean region in south-western France.

The wingspan is 5.6-6.7 mm for males. Adults were found in July and August.
