= Trifurcula manygoza =

Scientific classification
- Kingdom: Animalia
- Phylum: Arthropoda
- Clade: Pancrustacea
- Class: Insecta
- Order: Lepidoptera
- Family: Nepticulidae
- Genus: Trifurcula
- Species: T. manygoza

Binomial name
- Trifurcula manygoza van Nieukerken, A. & Z. Lastuvka, 2007

Species of moth

Trifurcula manygoza is a moth of the family Nepticulidae. It is only known to be from Croatia and north-western Greece. But is probably also present in other Balkan countries.

The wingspan is 4.7–6 mm for males and 5.5 mm for females. Larvae have been found in July and adults were collected in June and August.

The larvae feed on Lotus corniculatus. They mine the leaves of their host plant.
