= Trifurcula raikhonae =

Scientific classification
- Kingdom: Animalia
- Phylum: Arthropoda
- Class: Insecta
- Order: Lepidoptera
- Family: Nepticulidae
- Genus: Trifurcula
- Species: T. raikhonae

Binomial name
- Trifurcula raikhonae (Puplesis, 1985)

Synonyms
- Glaucolepis raikhonae Puplesis, 1985

Species of moth

Trifurcula raikhonae is a moth of the family Nepticulidae. It was described by Puplesis in 1985. It is widespread in the Central Asian mountains, including the western and central Tyan Shan (Kazakhstan and Kirgiziya), the Gissar Range in Tadzhikistan, and the northern Kugitangtau mountains in Uzbekistan and in central Afghanistan. It is not found in lowland desert areas.

The length of the forewings is 3.1-3.9 mm for males and 3.2-4.0 mm for females. Adults have been recorded from May to August.

The larvae possibly make galls in branches of Prunus species.

== Taxonomy ==
Sinopticula sinica is possibly a synonym.
