= Trifurcula liskai =

Scientific classification
- Kingdom: Animalia
- Phylum: Arthropoda
- Class: Insecta
- Order: Lepidoptera
- Family: Nepticulidae
- Genus: Trifurcula
- Species: T. liskai

Binomial name
- Trifurcula liskai A. & Z. Lastuvka, 2000

Species of moth

Trifurcula liskai is a moth of the family Nepticulidae. It is found in Slovenia, northern Italy and Austria.
