= Trifurcula argentosa =

Scientific classification
- Kingdom: Animalia
- Phylum: Arthropoda
- Clade: Pancrustacea
- Class: Insecta
- Order: Lepidoptera
- Family: Nepticulidae
- Genus: Trifurcula
- Species: T. argentosa

Binomial name
- Trifurcula argentosa (Puplesis & Robinson, 2000)

Synonyms
- Glaucolepis argentosa Puplesis & Robinson, 2000

Species of moth

Trifurcula argentosa is a moth of the family Nepticulidae. It was described by Puplesis and Robinson in 2000. It is endemic to Belize.
