= Trifurcula helladica =

Scientific classification
- Kingdom: Animalia
- Phylum: Arthropoda
- Class: Insecta
- Order: Lepidoptera
- Family: Nepticulidae
- Genus: Trifurcula
- Species: T. helladica

Binomial name
- Trifurcula helladica Z. & A. Lastuvka, 2007

Species of moth

Trifurcula helladica is a moth of the family Nepticulidae. It is found in Greece (Peloponnisos and Crete).

The wingspan is 4-4.4 mm.
