= Trifurcula saccharella =

Scientific classification
- Kingdom: Animalia
- Phylum: Arthropoda
- Clade: Pancrustacea
- Class: Insecta
- Order: Lepidoptera
- Family: Nepticulidae
- Genus: Trifurcula
- Species: T. saccharella

Binomial name
- Trifurcula saccharella (Braun, 1912)

Synonyms
- Nepticula saccharella Braun, 1912; Glaucolepis saccharella

Species of moth

Trifurcula saccharella is a moth of the family Nepticulidae. It is found in Ohio, United States.

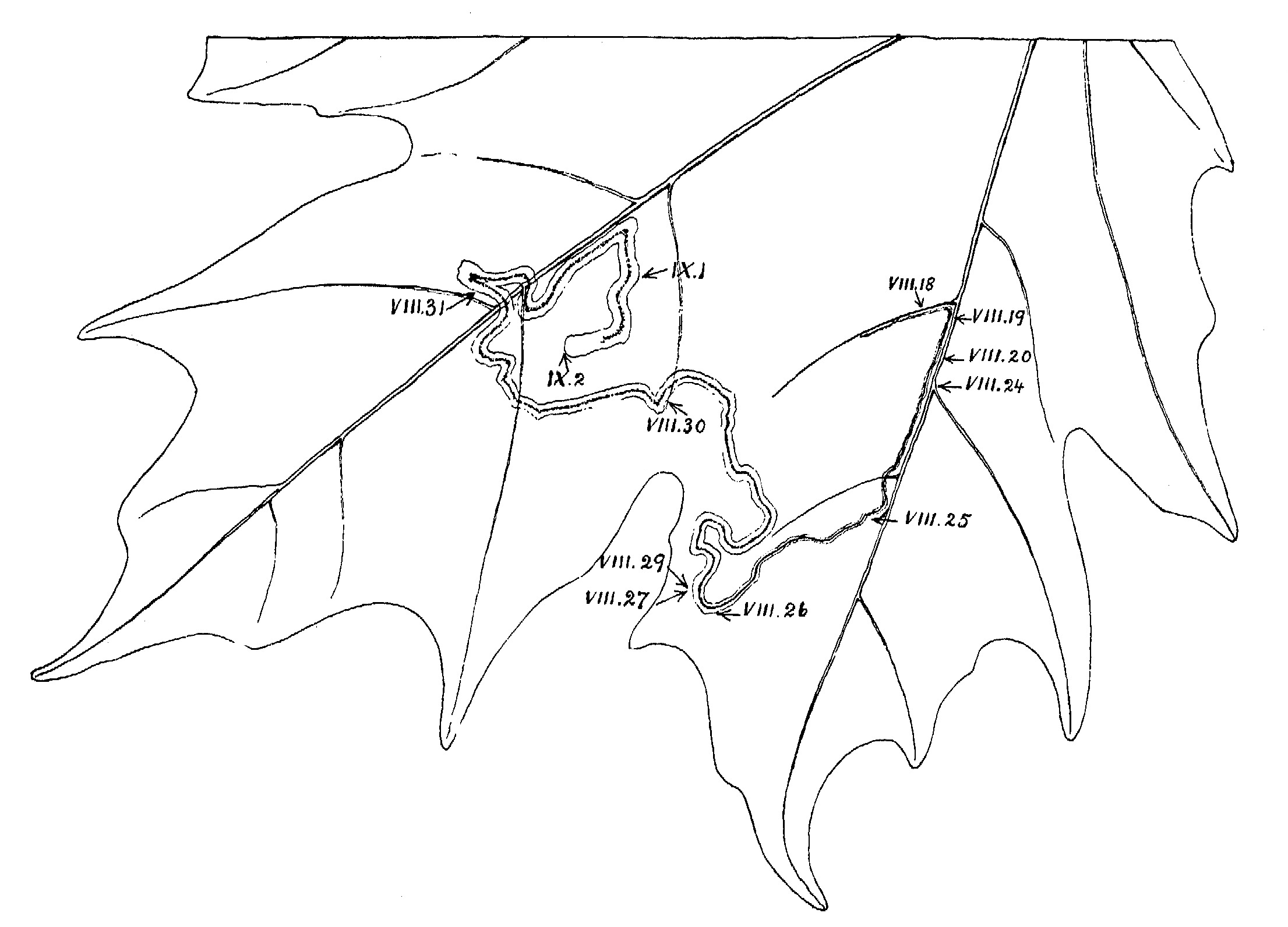
Mine

The wingspan is about 4 mm. Mined leaves may be collected in early July and late August; sometimes the larvae of a third generation are found in October. Moths from the overwintering pupae emerge in May and June.

The larvae feed on Acer saccharum and Acer rubrum. They mine the leaves of their host plant.
