= Trifurcula aerifica =

Scientific classification
- Kingdom: Animalia
- Phylum: Arthropoda
- Class: Insecta
- Order: Lepidoptera
- Family: Nepticulidae
- Genus: Trifurcula
- Species: T. aerifica

Binomial name
- Trifurcula aerifica (Meyrick, 1915)

Synonyms
- Nepticula aerifica Meyrick, 1915; Glaucolepis aerifica

Species of moth

Trifurcula aerifica is a moth of the family Nepticulidae. It was described by Edward Meyrick in 1915. It is known from Peru.
