= Trifurcula macedonica =

Scientific classification
- Kingdom: Animalia
- Phylum: Arthropoda
- Class: Insecta
- Order: Lepidoptera
- Family: Nepticulidae
- Genus: Trifurcula
- Species: T. macedonica

Binomial name
- Trifurcula macedonica Laštuvka, A. & Z., 1998

Species of moth

Trifurcula macedonica is a moth of the family Nepticulidae. It was described by A. and Z. Laštuvka in 1998. It is known from Negotino, North Macedonia.
