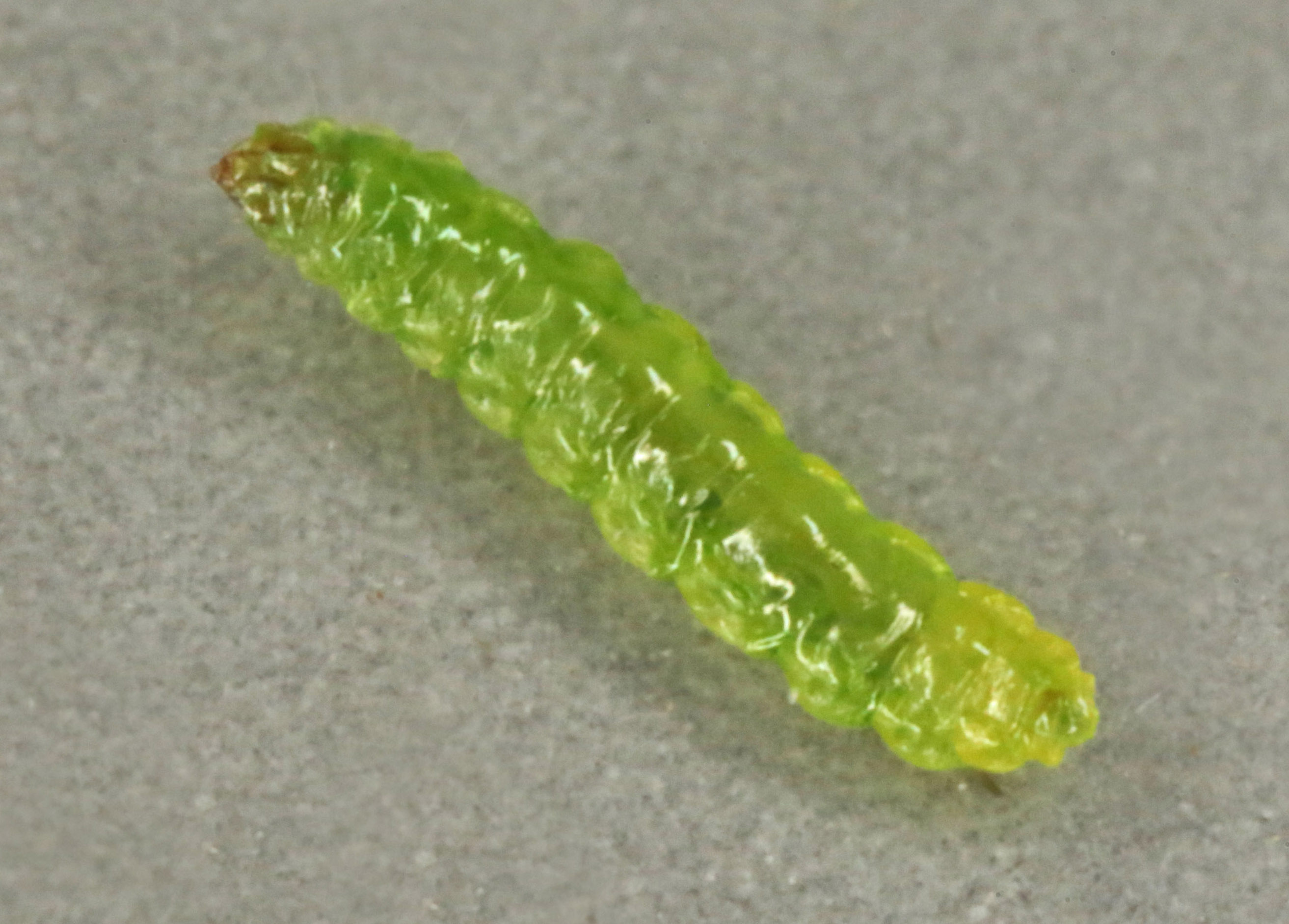
- larva

Scientific classification
- Kingdom: Animalia
- Phylum: Arthropoda
- Clade: Pancrustacea
- Class: Insecta
- Order: Lepidoptera
- Family: Nepticulidae
- Genus: Stigmella
- Species: S. crataegella

Binomial name
- Stigmella crataegella (Klimesch, 1936)

Synonyms
- Nepticula crataegella Klimesch, 1936

= Stigmella crataegella =

Species of moth

Stigmella crataegella is a moth of the family Nepticulidae found in Europe. It was described by the Austrian entomologist Josef Wilhelm Klimesch in 1936. The larvae mine the leaves of hawthorns.

== Life cycle ==
The wingspan is 4–5 mm. The head is black, the collar white. The antennal eyecaps are white. The forewings are a shining golden brown basal to a brassy fascia. Distad beyond this is dark purple brown.The hindwings are grey brown. Male has black scent scales

Adults are on wing from May to early June. There is one generation per year.

Ovum

Eggs are laid on the underside of hawthorn leaves, at the base of the leaf, close to the midrib.

Larvae

Larvae feed from June to August and are bright green with a transparent green head; the mandibles are pale brown. They feed on Crataegus laciniata, woodland hawthorn (Crataegus laevigata), common hawthorn (Crataegus monogyna), small-flowered black hawthorn (Crataegus pentagyna), river hawthorn (Crataegus rivularis), littlehip hawthorn (Crataegus spathulata) and Crataemespilus grandiflora. They mine the leaves of their host plant.

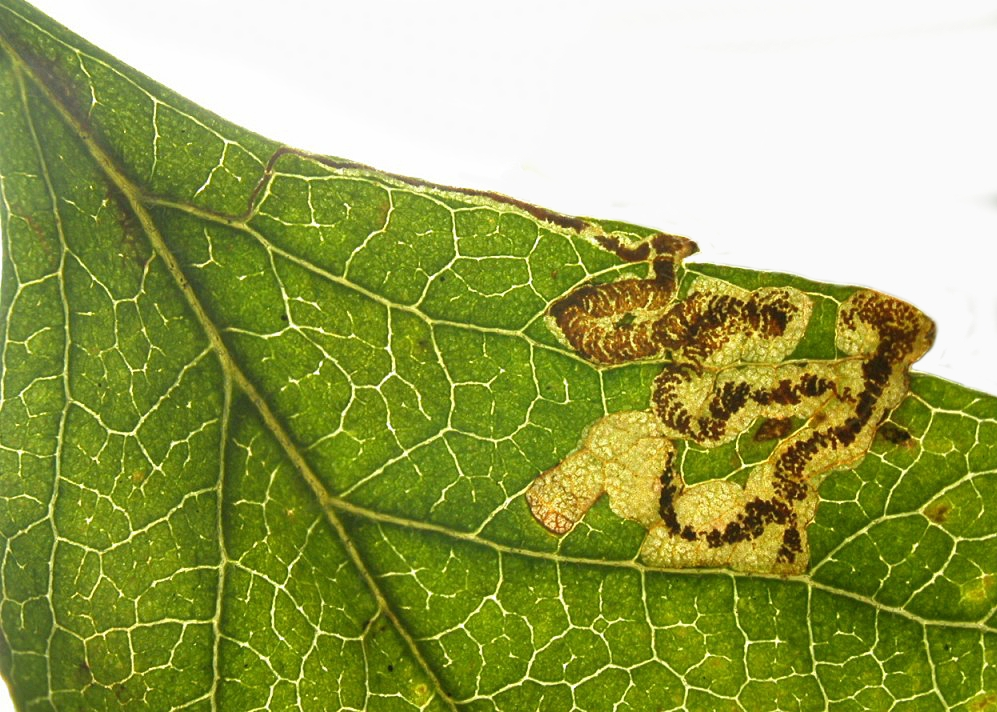
Stigmella crataegella mine. Note the initial narrow gallery.

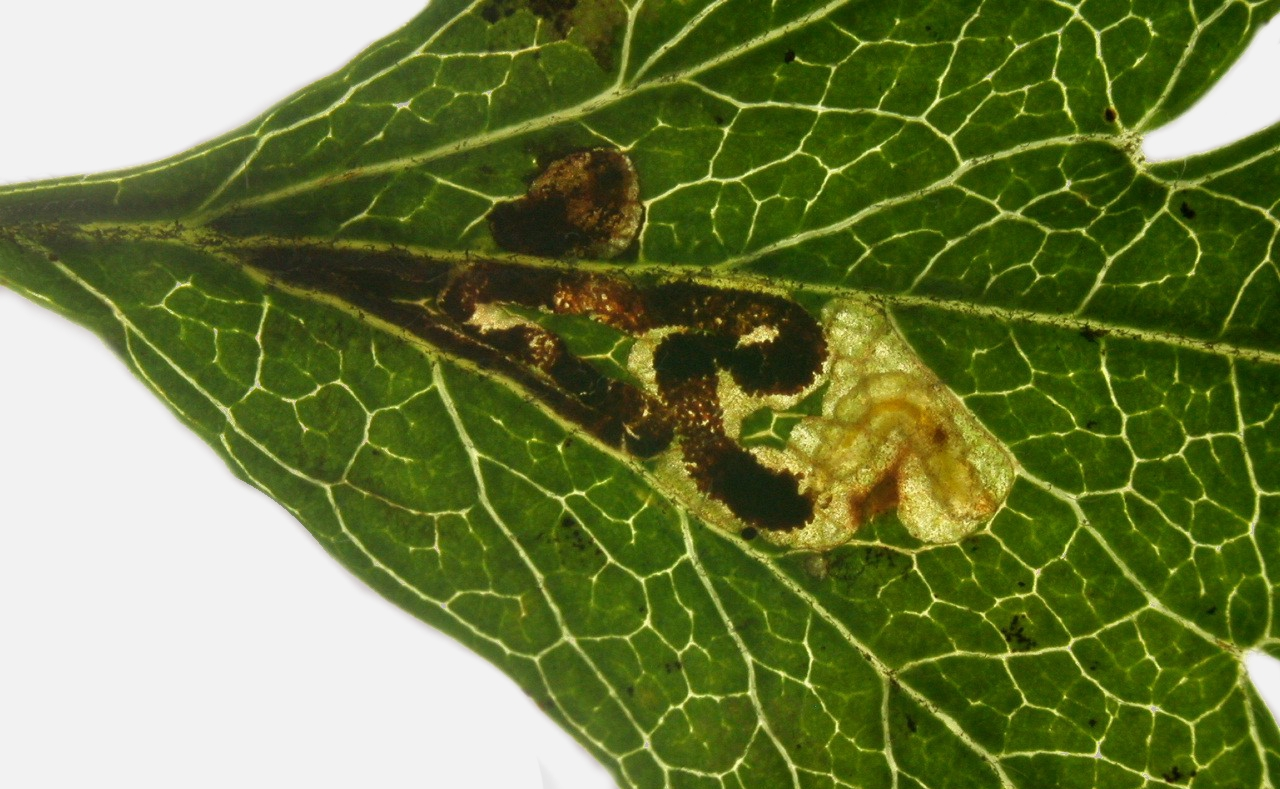
Stigmella perpygmaeella mine.

Pupa

The cocoon is reddish-brown and spun either on or below the surface.

== Distribution ==
The moth is found from Fennoscandia to the Iberian Peninsula, Italy and Macedonia, and from Ireland to Poland and Romania.

== Etymology ==
Stigmella crataegella was originally named Nepticula crataegella by Josef Wilhelm Klimesch in 1936, from a specimen found in the Tyrol, Austria. Nepticula, refers to a grand daughter, the smallest member of a family (i.e. the small size of the moth), while crataegella refers to the genus of the food plant. The genus Stigmella – ″stigma″, refers to the conspicuous (or occasionally metallic) small dot or a brand fascia on the forewing of many of the Stigmella species, or possibly the small size of the moths.
