= Trifurcula pullus =

Scientific classification
- Kingdom: Animalia
- Phylum: Arthropoda
- Clade: Pancrustacea
- Class: Insecta
- Order: Lepidoptera
- Family: Nepticulidae
- Genus: Trifurcula
- Species: T. pullus

Binomial name
- Trifurcula pullus Scoble, 1980

Species of moth

Trifurcula pullus is a moth of the family Nepticulidae. It was described by Scoble in 1980. It is known from South Africa (it was described from the Kruger National Park).
