= Trifurcula alypella =

Scientific classification
- Kingdom: Animalia
- Phylum: Arthropoda
- Clade: Pancrustacea
- Class: Insecta
- Order: Lepidoptera
- Family: Nepticulidae
- Genus: Trifurcula
- Species: T. alypella

Binomial name
- Trifurcula alypella Klimesch, 1975

Species of moth

Trifurcula alypella is a moth of the family Nepticulidae. It is found in mainland Spain, Mallorca and France.

The habitat consists of warm limestone areas.

The wingspan is 4.75–5 mm.

The larvae feed on Globularia alypum. They mine the leaves of their host plant.
