= Trifurcula graeca =

Scientific classification
- Kingdom: Animalia
- Phylum: Arthropoda
- Class: Insecta
- Order: Lepidoptera
- Family: Nepticulidae
- Genus: Trifurcula
- Species: T. graeca

Binomial name
- Trifurcula graeca Laštuvka, A. & Z., 1998

Species of moth

Trifurcula graeca is a moth of the family Nepticulidae. It was described by A. and Z. Laštuvka in 1998. It is known from Lakonia, Greece. The host plant for the species is possibly Genista acanthoclada.
