= Trifurcula oishiella =

Scientific classification
- Kingdom: Animalia
- Phylum: Arthropoda
- Class: Insecta
- Order: Lepidoptera
- Family: Nepticulidae
- Genus: Trifurcula
- Species: T. oishiella

Binomial name
- Trifurcula oishiella Matsumura, 1931

Species of moth

Trifurcula oishiella is a moth of the family Nepticulidae. It was described by Shōnen Matsumura in 1931. It is known from the main Japanese island of Honshu.

The larvae form galls in Prunus species.
