= Trifurcula orientella =

Scientific classification
- Kingdom: Animalia
- Phylum: Arthropoda
- Clade: Pancrustacea
- Class: Insecta
- Order: Lepidoptera
- Family: Nepticulidae
- Genus: Trifurcula
- Species: T. orientella

Binomial name
- Trifurcula orientella Klimesch, 1953

Species of moth

Trifurcula orientella is a moth of the family Nepticulidae. It is found from Portugal and southern France across Liguria and Slovenia and southern central Europe to Greece.

The larvae feed on Genista germanica, Genista hispanica, Genista sylvestris and other small, mostly thorny Genista species. They mine the stems of their host plant.
