= Ectoedemia liguricella =

Scientific classification
- Kingdom: Animalia
- Phylum: Arthropoda
- Clade: Pancrustacea
- Class: Insecta
- Order: Lepidoptera
- Family: Nepticulidae
- Genus: Ectoedemia
- Species: E. liguricella

Binomial name
- Ectoedemia liguricella Klimesch, 1953

Species of moth

Ectoedemia liguricella is a moth of the family Nepticulidae. It is found in the western part of the Mediterranean region, where it is known from the Italian Riviera, France, Spain and Morocco. It occurs from sea-level to high elevations in the mountains

The wingspan is 7.6–9 mm. Adults have been caught from May to September.
