= Stigmella crenulatae =

Scientific classification
- Kingdom: Animalia
- Phylum: Arthropoda
- Clade: Pancrustacea
- Class: Insecta
- Order: Lepidoptera
- Family: Nepticulidae
- Genus: Stigmella
- Species: S. crenulatae

Binomial name
- Stigmella crenulatae (Klimesch, 1975)

Synonyms
- Nepticula crenulatae Klimesch, 1975

Species of moth

Stigmella crenulatae is a moth of the family Nepticulidae. It is found on the Canary Islands and the Iberian Peninsula.

The larvae feed on Rhamnus crenulata and Rhamnus lycioides. They mine the leaves of their host plant.
