= Trifurcula zollikofferiela =

Scientific classification
- Kingdom: Animalia
- Phylum: Arthropoda
- Class: Insecta
- Order: Lepidoptera
- Family: Nepticulidae
- Genus: Trifurcula
- Species: T. zollikofferiela

Binomial name
- Trifurcula zollikofferiela (Chrétien, 1914)

Synonyms
- Glaucolepis zollikofferiela; Nepticula zollikofferiela; Stigmella zollikofferiela

Species of moth

Trifurcula zollikofferiela is a moth of the family Nepticulidae. It was described by Pierre Chrétien in 1914. It is known from Algeria.

The larvae feed on Launea nudicaulis.
