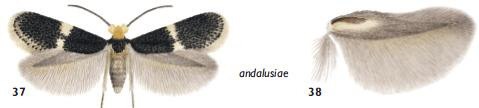
- Male and male hindwing

Scientific classification
- Kingdom: Animalia
- Phylum: Arthropoda
- Clade: Pancrustacea
- Class: Insecta
- Order: Lepidoptera
- Family: Nepticulidae
- Genus: Ectoedemia
- Species: E. andalusiae

Binomial name
- Ectoedemia andalusiae van Nieukerken, 1985

= Ectoedemia andalusiae =

Species of moth

Ectoedemia andalusiae is a moth of the family Nepticulidae. It is found on the Iberian Peninsula, as well as in France.

The wingspan is 5.4-6.9 mm. Adults have been collected in June, July and September.

The larvae feed on Quercus coccifera. They mine the leaves of their host plant.

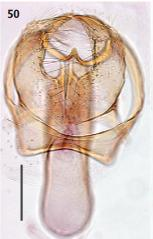
Male genitalia

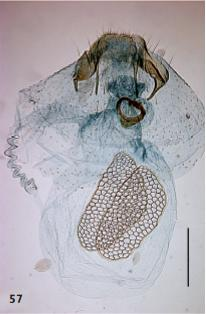
Female genitalia

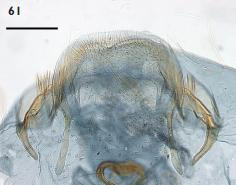
Female terminal abdominal segment
