= Trifurcula silviae =

Scientific classification
- Kingdom: Animalia
- Phylum: Arthropoda
- Clade: Pancrustacea
- Class: Insecta
- Order: Lepidoptera
- Family: Nepticulidae
- Genus: Trifurcula
- Species: T. silviae

Binomial name
- Trifurcula silviae van Nieukerken, 1990

Species of moth

Trifurcula silviae is a moth of the family Nepticulidae. It is known from the Alps and Prealps of south-eastern France.

The wingspan is 5.8–7 mm for males and 5.8 mm for females. They are on wing from June to August.
