= Trifurcula josefklimeschi =

Scientific classification
- Kingdom: Animalia
- Phylum: Arthropoda
- Clade: Pancrustacea
- Class: Insecta
- Order: Lepidoptera
- Family: Nepticulidae
- Genus: Trifurcula
- Species: T. josefklimeschi

Binomial name
- Trifurcula josefklimeschi van Nieukerken, 1990

Species of moth

Trifurcula josefklimeschi is a moth of the family Nepticulidae. It is found south of the line running from France to the Czech Republic and Ukraine.

The wingspan is 4.9-6.5 mm for males and 4.9-6.1 mm for females. Adults emerge from late May to mid-September. There might be two generations per year.

The larvae feed on Dorycnium hirsutum and Dorycnium pentaphyllum. They mine the leaves of their host plant. Larvae have been found in January, February, and early April.
