= Trifurcula istriae =

Scientific classification
- Kingdom: Animalia
- Phylum: Arthropoda
- Class: Insecta
- Order: Lepidoptera
- Family: Nepticulidae
- Genus: Trifurcula
- Species: T. istriae

Binomial name
- Trifurcula istriae A. & Z. Lastuvka, 2000

Species of moth

Trifurcula istriae is a moth of the family Nepticulidae. It is only known from Croatia and northern Italy.
