= Trifurcula trasaghica =

Scientific classification
- Kingdom: Animalia
- Phylum: Arthropoda
- Clade: Pancrustacea
- Class: Insecta
- Order: Lepidoptera
- Family: Nepticulidae
- Genus: Trifurcula
- Species: T. trasaghica

Binomial name
- Trifurcula trasaghica Laštuvka, A. & Z., 2005

Species of moth

Trifurcula trasaghica is a moth of the family Nepticulidae. It was described by A. and Z. Laštuvka in 2005. It is known from Udine, Italy. The hostplant for the species is Corothamnus decumbens.
