= Trifurcula iberica =

Scientific classification
- Kingdom: Animalia
- Phylum: Arthropoda
- Clade: Pancrustacea
- Class: Insecta
- Order: Lepidoptera
- Family: Nepticulidae
- Genus: Trifurcula
- Species: T. iberica

Binomial name
- Trifurcula iberica van Nieukerken, 1990

Species of moth

Trifurcula iberica is a moth of the family Nepticulidae.

Its wingspan is 6-7.2 mm for males.
