= Trifurcula micromeriae =

Scientific classification
- Kingdom: Animalia
- Phylum: Arthropoda
- Class: Insecta
- Order: Lepidoptera
- Family: Nepticulidae
- Genus: Trifurcula
- Species: T. micromeriae

Binomial name
- Trifurcula micromeriae (Walsingham, 1908)

Synonyms
- Stigmella micromeriae Walsingham, 1908

Species of moth

Trifurcula micromeriae is a moth of the family Nepticulidae. It is endemic to the Canary Islands.

The larvae feed on Micromeria teneriffae and Micromeria varia. They mine the leaves of their host plant.
