= Trifurcula corothamni =

Scientific classification
- Kingdom: Animalia
- Phylum: Arthropoda
- Class: Insecta
- Order: Lepidoptera
- Family: Nepticulidae
- Genus: Trifurcula
- Species: T. corothamni

Binomial name
- Trifurcula corothamni Z. & A. Laštuvka, 1994

Species of moth

Trifurcula corothamni is a moth of the family Nepticulidae. It was described by Zdenek Laštuvka and Ales Laštuvka in 1994. It is known from the Czech Republic and Slovakia.
