= Trifurcula serotinella =

Scientific classification
- Kingdom: Animalia
- Phylum: Arthropoda
- Class: Insecta
- Order: Lepidoptera
- Family: Nepticulidae
- Genus: Trifurcula
- Species: T. serotinella

Binomial name
- Trifurcula serotinella (Herrich-Schäffer, 1855)

Synonyms
- Trifurcula confertella Fuchs, 1895

Species of moth

Trifurcula serotinella is a moth of the family Nepticulidae. It was described by Gottlieb August Wilhelm Herrich-Schäffer in 1855. It is known from France, Germany, Austria, Switzerland, the Czech Republic and Romania.
