= Trifurcula melanoptera =

Scientific classification
- Kingdom: Animalia
- Phylum: Arthropoda
- Clade: Pancrustacea
- Class: Insecta
- Order: Lepidoptera
- Family: Nepticulidae
- Genus: Trifurcula
- Species: T. melanoptera

Binomial name
- Trifurcula melanoptera van Nieukerken & Puplesis, 1991

Species of moth

Trifurcula melanoptera is a moth of the family Nepticulidae. It was described by van Nieukerken and Puplesis in 1991. It is widespread in southern Europe, where it is known from Spain, southern France, Italy, Sardinia, Austria, the Czech Republic, Hungary, former Yugoslavia and the Crimea. It is also known from western Asia, including Anatolia, Armenia and western Turkmenistan.

Adults have been recorded from July to August or September. There is probably one generation per year.

The immature stages and host plant are unknown, but it is not impossible that it is a gall-maker on Prunus species.
