= Trifurcula baldensis =

Scientific classification
- Kingdom: Animalia
- Phylum: Arthropoda
- Clade: Pancrustacea
- Class: Insecta
- Order: Lepidoptera
- Family: Nepticulidae
- Genus: Trifurcula
- Species: T. baldensis

Binomial name
- Trifurcula baldensis A. & Z. Lastuvka, 2005

Species of moth

Trifurcula baldensis is a moth of the family Nepticulidae. It is known from Monte Baldo in Italy.

The larvae feed on Genista radiata.
