= Trifurcula sanctibenedicti =

Scientific classification
- Kingdom: Animalia
- Phylum: Arthropoda
- Clade: Pancrustacea
- Class: Insecta
- Order: Lepidoptera
- Family: Nepticulidae
- Genus: Trifurcula
- Species: T. sanctibenedicti

Binomial name
- Trifurcula sanctibenedicti Klimesch, 1979

Species of moth

Trifurcula sanctibenedicti is a moth of the family Nepticulidae. It is found in Spain.

The wingspan is 5-5.5 mm.

The larvae feed on Bupleurum fruticescens. They mine the leaves of their host plant. Pupation takes place outside of the mine.
