= Stigmella rolandi =

Scientific classification
- Kingdom: Animalia
- Phylum: Arthropoda
- Clade: Pancrustacea
- Class: Insecta
- Order: Lepidoptera
- Family: Nepticulidae
- Genus: Stigmella
- Species: S. rolandi

Binomial name
- Stigmella rolandi van Nieukerken, 1990

Species of moth

Stigmella rolandi is a moth of the family Nepticulidae. It is found from Germany to the Iberian Peninsula, Sardinia, Italy and Greece, and from France to central en southern Russia. It is also present in the Near East.

The wingspan is 3.7–4.7 millimetres (0.15–0.19 in) for males and 4.1–4.2 millimetres (0.16–0.17 in) for females. Adults are on wing from early June to early September. There are probably two generations per year.

The larvae feed on Rosa pimpinellifolia, Rosa rugosa and Sanguisorba minor. They mine the leaves of their host plant.
