= Trifurcula aurella =

Scientific classification
- Kingdom: Animalia
- Phylum: Arthropoda
- Class: Insecta
- Order: Lepidoptera
- Family: Nepticulidae
- Genus: Trifurcula
- Species: T. aurella

Binomial name
- Trifurcula aurella Rebel, 1933

Species of moth

Trifurcula aurella is a moth of the family Nepticulidae. It is known from France, Italy, Croatia and Greece.

The wingspan is about 7 mm.
