= Trifurcula ortneri =

Scientific classification
- Kingdom: Animalia
- Phylum: Arthropoda
- Clade: Pancrustacea
- Class: Insecta
- Order: Lepidoptera
- Family: Nepticulidae
- Genus: Trifurcula
- Species: T. ortneri

Binomial name
- Trifurcula ortneri (Klimesch, 1951)

Synonyms
- Nepticula ortneri Klimesch, 1951; Stigmella ortneri

Species of moth

Trifurcula ortneri is a moth of the family Nepticulidae. It is widespread in the western Mediterranean region, where it is known from the Algarve in Portugal, Spain, France and Italy (Emilia-Romagna, Veneto). It has also been recorded from Croatia (Dalmatia), Morocco and Algeria, eastern Austria, Hungary, Slovakia and Germany (Baden-Württemberg and Thüringen).

The larvae feed on Coronilla coronata, Coronilla emerus, Coronilla minima, Coronilla vaginalis, Coronilla valentina, Coronilla valentine glauca and Coronilla viminalis. They mine the leaves of their host plant.
