= Trifurcula moravica =

Scientific classification
- Kingdom: Animalia
- Phylum: Arthropoda
- Class: Insecta
- Order: Lepidoptera
- Family: Nepticulidae
- Genus: Trifurcula
- Species: T. moravica

Binomial name
- Trifurcula moravica Z. & A. Laštuvka, 1994

Species of moth

Trifurcula moravica is a moth of the family Nepticulidae. It was described by Zdenek Laštuvka and Ales Laštuvka in 1994. It is known from Austria, the Czech Republic and Italy.
