= Trifurcula sanctaecrucis =

Scientific classification
- Kingdom: Animalia
- Phylum: Arthropoda
- Class: Insecta
- Order: Lepidoptera
- Family: Nepticulidae
- Genus: Trifurcula
- Species: T. sanctaecrucis

Binomial name
- Trifurcula sanctaecrucis (Walsingham, 1908)

Synonyms
- Stigmella sanctaecrucis Walsingham, 1908

Species of moth

Trifurcula sanctaecrucis is a moth of the family Nepticulidae. It is endemic to the Canary Islands.

The larvae feed on Lavandula canariensis. They mine the leaves of their host plant.
