= Ectoedemia leucothorax =

Scientific classification
- Kingdom: Animalia
- Phylum: Arthropoda
- Clade: Pancrustacea
- Class: Insecta
- Order: Lepidoptera
- Family: Nepticulidae
- Genus: Ectoedemia
- Species: E. leucothorax

Binomial name
- Ectoedemia leucothorax van Nieukerken, 1985

Species of moth

Ectoedemia leucothorax is a moth of the family Nepticulidae. It is only known from the Costa del Sol in Spain.

The wingspan is 5.2–6 mm. Adults are on wing from May to early July.

The host plant unknown, but most likely it consists of evergreen Quercus. They mine the leaves of their host plant.
