= Trifurcula squamatella =

Scientific classification
- Kingdom: Animalia
- Phylum: Arthropoda
- Clade: Pancrustacea
- Class: Insecta
- Order: Lepidoptera
- Family: Nepticulidae
- Genus: Trifurcula
- Species: T. squamatella

Binomial name
- Trifurcula squamatella Stainton, 1849

Synonyms
- Trifurcula maxima Klimesch, 1953

Species of moth

Trifurcula squamatella is a moth of the family Nepticulidae. It was described by Henry Tibbats Stainton in 1849. It is found in most of Europe.

The wingspan is 7.8–9.8 mm for males and 8.4–10 mm for females.

The larvae probably mine the bark of broom.
