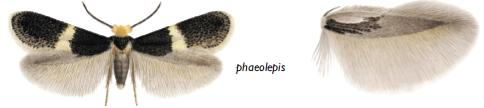
- Male and male hindwing

Scientific classification
- Kingdom: Animalia
- Phylum: Arthropoda
- Clade: Pancrustacea
- Class: Insecta
- Order: Lepidoptera
- Family: Nepticulidae
- Genus: Ectoedemia
- Species: E. phaeolepis

Binomial name
- Ectoedemia phaeolepis van Nieukerken, A. & Z. Lastuvka, 2009

= Ectoedemia phaeolepis =

Species of moth

Ectoedemia phaeolepis is a moth of the family Nepticulidae. It is endemic to the Iberian Peninsula.

The wingspan is 5.4–6 mm. Adults are on wing from late May to early August.

The larvae feed on Quercus ilex and Quercus rotundifolia. They mine the leaves of their host plant.

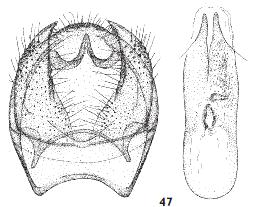
Male genitalia

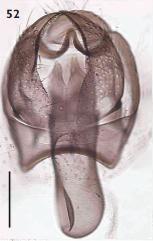
Male genitalia

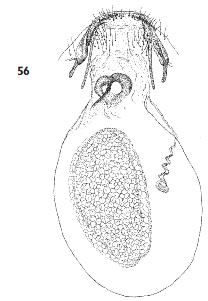
Female genitalia

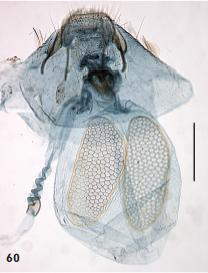
Female genitalia

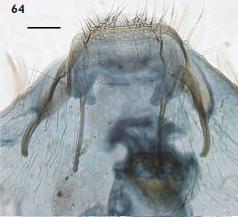
Female terminal abdominal segment

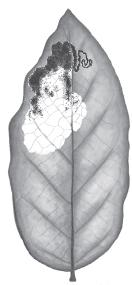
Leafmine
