= Trifurcula stoechadella =

Scientific classification
- Kingdom: Animalia
- Phylum: Arthropoda
- Clade: Pancrustacea
- Class: Insecta
- Order: Lepidoptera
- Family: Nepticulidae
- Genus: Trifurcula
- Species: T. stoechadella

Binomial name
- Trifurcula stoechadella Klimesch, 1975

Species of moth

Trifurcula stoechadella is a moth of the family Nepticulidae. It is found in the western Mediterranean region, from France and the Iberian Peninsula to Corsica and Italy.

The larvae feed on Lavandula stoechas. They mine the leaves of their host plant.
