= Trifurcula coronillae =

Scientific classification
- Kingdom: Animalia
- Phylum: Arthropoda
- Clade: Pancrustacea
- Class: Insecta
- Order: Lepidoptera
- Family: Nepticulidae
- Genus: Trifurcula
- Species: T. coronillae

Binomial name
- Trifurcula coronillae van Nieukerken, 1990

Species of moth

Trifurcula coronillae is a moth of the family Nepticulidae. It is found along the Mediterranean coast of Spain, but probably has a wider range.

The wingspan is 5.6-6.7 mm for males and 5.4-6.4 mm for females. Adults emerge from May to August. There is probably one generation per year.

The larvae feed on Coronilla juncea. The larva makes a very conspicuous gallery mine in the green bark, in which the living larva can easily been seen. The mine often starts contorting, frequently encircling the stem. The larva usually feeds downward first, but later changes feeding direction one or more times. The mine usually ends in an upwards direction. The mine is filled with greenish brown frass. There are often numerous mines in a single stem. The cocoon is brown and made in the soil or leaf litter. Larvae have been collected in January and February, but many mines were already vacated in that period, so that larvae probably start mining in autumn.
