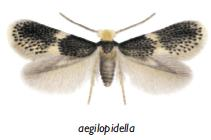

Scientific classification
- Kingdom: Animalia
- Phylum: Arthropoda
- Class: Insecta
- Order: Lepidoptera
- Family: Nepticulidae
- Subfamily: Nepticulinae
- Genus: Trifurcula; Zeller, 1848

Synonyms
- Sinopticula Yang, 1989; Glaucolepis Braun, 1917 (non Glaucolepis Stensiö, 1921); Levarchama Beirne, 1945; Fedalmia Beirne, 1945

= Trifurcula =

Genus of moths

Trifurcula is a genus of moths of the family Nepticulidae. For the Triassic aged ray-fin "Glaucolepis" Stensiö, 1921 (non Glaucolepis Braun, 1917) see Pteronisculus.

== Selected species ==
- Trifurcula aerifica (Meyrick, 1915)
- Trifurcula albiflorella Klimesch, 1978
- Trifurcula alypella Klimesch, 1975
- Trifurcula andalusica Z. & A. Lastuvka, 2007
- Trifurcula anthyllidella Klimesch, 1975
- Trifurcula argentosa (Puplesis & Robinson, 2000)
- Trifurcula aurella Rebel, 1933
- Trifurcula austriaca van Nieukerken, 1990
- Trifurcula baldensis A. & Z. Lastuvka, 2005
- Trifurcula barbertonensis Scoble, 1980
- Trifurcula beirnei Puplesis, 1984
- Trifurcula bleonella (Chretien, 1904)
- Trifurcula bupleurella (Chretien, 1907)
- Trifurcula calycotomella A. & Z. Lastuvka, 1997
- Trifurcula chamaecytisi Z. & A. Lastuvka, 1994
- Trifurcula corleyi Z. & A. Lastuvka, 2007
- Trifurcula coronillae van Nieukerken, 1990
- Trifurcula corothamni Z. & A. Lastuvka, 1994
- Trifurcula cryptella (Stainton, 1856)
- Trifurcula cytisanthi A. & Z. Lastuvka, 2005
- Trifurcula etnensis A. & Z. Lastuvka, 2005
- Trifurcula eurema (Tutt, 1899)
- Trifurcula globulariae Klimesch, 1975
- Trifurcula graeca Z. & A. Lastuvka, 1998
- Trifurcula hamirella (Chrétien, 1915) (=Trifurcula saturejae (Parenti, 1963))
- Trifurcula headleyella (Stainton, 1854)
- Trifurcula helladica Z. & A. Lastuvka, 2007
- Trifurcula iberica van Nieukerken, 1990
- Trifurcula immundella (Zeller, 1839)
- Trifurcula istriae A. & Z. Lastuvka, 2000
- Trifurcula josefklimeschi van Nieukerken, 1990
- Trifurcula kalavritana Z. & A. Lastuvka, 1998
- Trifurcula lavandulae Z. & A. Lastuvka, 2007
- Trifurcula liskai A. & Z. Lastuvka, 2000
- Trifurcula luteola van Nieukerken, 1990
- Trifurcula macedonica Z. & A. Lastuvka, 1998
- Trifurcula magna A. & Z. Lastuvka, 1997
- Trifurcula manygoza van Nieukerken, A. & Z. Lastuvka, 2007
- Trifurcula melanoptera van Nieukerken & Puplesis, 1991
- Trifurcula micromeriae (Walsingham, 1908)
- Trifurcula montana Z. Lastuvka, A. Lastuvka & Van Nieukerken, 2007
- Trifurcula moravica Z. & A. Lastuvka, 1994
- Trifurcula oishiella Matsumura, 1931
- Trifurcula orientella Klimesch, 1953
- Trifurcula ortneri (Klimesch, 1951)
- Trifurcula pallidella (Duponchel, 1843)
- Trifurcula pederi Z. & A. Lastuvka, 2007
- Trifurcula peloponnesica van Nieukerken, 2007
- Trifurcula pullus Scoble, 1980
- Trifurcula puplesisi van Nieukerken, 1990
- Trifurcula raikhonae (Puplesis, 1985)
- Trifurcula ridiculosa (Walsingham, 1908)
- Trifurcula rosmarinella (Chretien, 1914)
- Trifurcula rusticula (Meyrick, 1916)
- Trifurcula saccharella (Braun, 1912)
- Trifurcula salicinae Klimesch, 1975
- Trifurcula salvifoliae Z. & A. Lastuvka, 2007
- Trifurcula sanctaecrucis (Walsingham, 1908)
- Trifurcula sanctibenedicti Klimesch, 1979
- Trifurcula serotinella Herrich-Schaffer, 1855
- Trifurcula silviae van Nieukerken, 1990
- Trifurcula sinica (Yang, 1989)
- Trifurcula squamatella Stainton, 1849
- Trifurcula stoechadella Klimesch, 1975
- Trifurcula subnitidella (Duponche, 1843)
- Trifurcula teucriella (Chretien, 1914)
- Trifurcula thymi (Szocs, 1965)
- Trifurcula trasaghica A. & Z. Lastuvka, 2005
- Trifurcula trilobella Klimesch, 1978
- Trifurcula victoris van Nieukerken, 1990
- Trifurcula zollikofferiela (Chrétien, 1914)
