= Trifurcula rusticula =

Scientific classification
- Kingdom: Animalia
- Phylum: Arthropoda
- Class: Insecta
- Order: Lepidoptera
- Family: Nepticulidae
- Genus: Trifurcula
- Species: T. rusticula

Binomial name
- Trifurcula rusticula (Meyrick, 1916)

Synonyms
- Glaucolepis rusticula; Nepticula rusticula

Species of moth

Trifurcula rusticula is a moth of the family Nepticulidae. It was described by Edward Meyrick in 1916. It is known from India.
