= Ectoedemia longicaudella =

Scientific classification
- Kingdom: Animalia
- Phylum: Arthropoda
- Clade: Pancrustacea
- Class: Insecta
- Order: Lepidoptera
- Family: Nepticulidae
- Genus: Ectoedemia
- Species: E. longicaudella

Binomial name
- Ectoedemia longicaudella Klimesch, 1953

Synonyms
- Stigmella peiuii Nemes, 1972

Species of moth

Ectoedemia longicaudella is a moth of the family Nepticulidae. It is found from most of Europe (except Iceland, Ireland, Great Britain and Denmark), east to Belgorod and Kaluga in Russia. It is also present in the Near East.

The wingspan is 7-10.5 mm. Adults are on wing in June and July, in Yugoslavia adults have also been recorded in May and occasionally in early August.
