= Trifurcula magna =

Scientific classification
- Kingdom: Animalia
- Phylum: Arthropoda
- Class: Insecta
- Order: Lepidoptera
- Family: Nepticulidae
- Genus: Trifurcula
- Species: T. magna

Binomial name
- Trifurcula magna Laštuvka, A. & Z., 1997

Species of moth

Trifurcula magna is a moth of the family Nepticulidae. It was described by A. and Z. Laštuvka in 1997. It was described from Devinska Kobyla, Slovakia, but is also known from France and Hungary.
