= Ectoedemia coscoja =

Scientific classification
- Kingdom: Animalia
- Phylum: Arthropoda
- Clade: Pancrustacea
- Class: Insecta
- Order: Lepidoptera
- Family: Nepticulidae
- Genus: Ectoedemia
- Species: E. coscoja

Binomial name
- Ectoedemia coscoja van Nieukerken, A. & Z. Lastuvka, 2009

Species of moth

Ectoedemia coscoja is a moth of the family Nepticulidae. It is endemic to Spain (Catalunya, Aragon, Andalusia).

The wingspan is 4.3-5.1 mm. Adults are on wing from June to July. There is probably one generation per year.

The larvae feed on Quercus coccifera. They mine the leaves of their host plant.

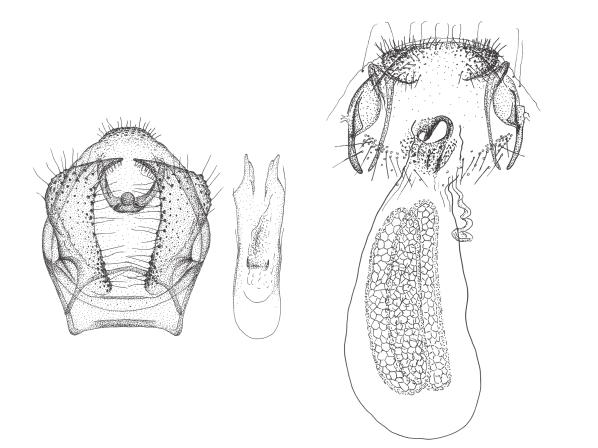
Genitalia, male (left), female (right)

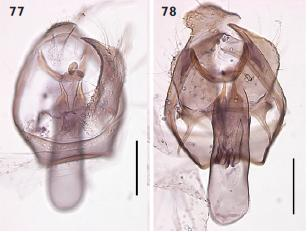
Male genitalia

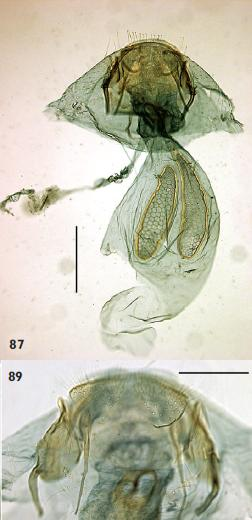
Female genitalia

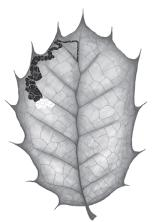
Leafmine
