= Trifurcula hamirella =

Scientific classification
- Kingdom: Animalia
- Phylum: Arthropoda
- Class: Insecta
- Order: Lepidoptera
- Family: Nepticulidae
- Genus: Trifurcula
- Species: T. hamirella

Binomial name
- Trifurcula hamirella (Chrétien, 1915)

Synonyms
- Nepticula hamirella Chrétien, 1915; Glaucolepis hamirella; Nepticula saturejae Parenti, 1963; Trifurcula saturejae (Parenti, 1963); Fedalmia saturejae; Stigmella saturejae; Glaucolepis saturejae

Species of moth

Trifurcula hamirella is a moth of the family Nepticulidae. It is found in the Mediterranean region from the Iberian Peninsula to Greece and in Algeria.

The larvae feed on Calamintha nepeta, Calamintha nepeta glandulosa, Calamintha sylvatica and Micromeria species. They mine the leaves of their host plant.
