= Trifurcula bupleurella =

Scientific classification
- Kingdom: Animalia
- Phylum: Arthropoda
- Class: Insecta
- Order: Lepidoptera
- Family: Nepticulidae
- Genus: Trifurcula
- Species: T. bupleurella

Binomial name
- Trifurcula bupleurella (Chretien, 1907)

Synonyms
- Nepticula bupleurella Chretien, 1907; Stigmella bupleurella

Species of moth

Trifurcula bupleurella is a moth of the family Nepticulidae. It is found in southern France and the Iberian Peninsula.

The larvae feed on Bupleurum fruticosum and Bupleurum rigidum. They mine the leaves of their host plant.
