= Trifurcula salvifoliae =

Scientific classification
- Kingdom: Animalia
- Phylum: Arthropoda
- Class: Insecta
- Order: Lepidoptera
- Family: Nepticulidae
- Genus: Trifurcula
- Species: T. salvifoliae

Binomial name
- Trifurcula salvifoliae Z. & A. Lastuvka, 2007

Species of moth

Trifurcula salvifoliae is a moth of the family Nepticulidae. It is found in Spain.

== Description ==
The larvae feed on Salvia officinalis subsp. lavandulifolia (syn. S. lavandulifolia). They mine the leaves of their host plant. The wingspan of the mature moth is 4.2-4.8 mm.
