= Trifurcula corleyi =

Scientific classification
- Kingdom: Animalia
- Phylum: Arthropoda
- Class: Insecta
- Order: Lepidoptera
- Family: Nepticulidae
- Genus: Trifurcula
- Species: T. corleyi

Binomial name
- Trifurcula corleyi Z. & A. Lastuvka, 2007

Species of moth

Trifurcula corleyi is a moth of the family Nepticulidae. It is found in central and southern Spain (in the provinces of Ávila, Cuenca, Málaga, and Toledo) and Portugal.

The wingspan is 4-5.2 mm.
