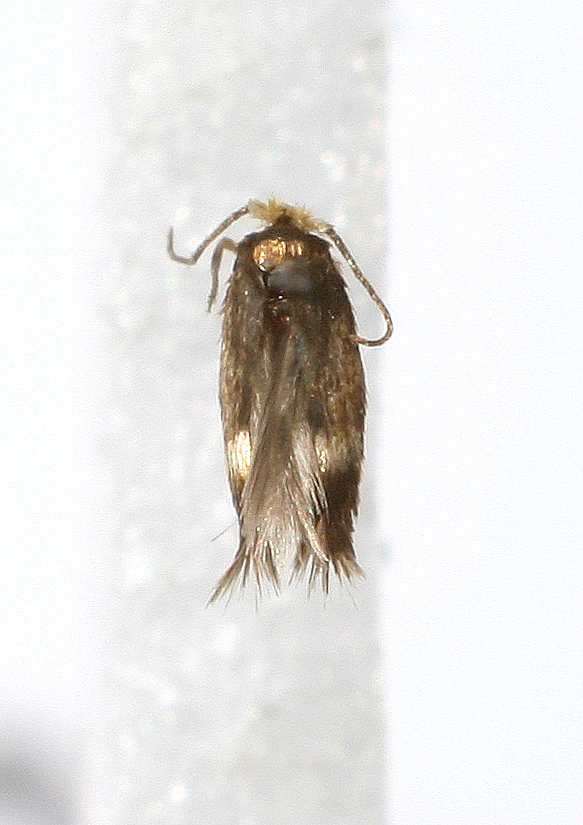

Scientific classification
- Kingdom: Animalia
- Phylum: Arthropoda
- Class: Insecta
- Order: Lepidoptera
- Family: Nepticulidae
- Genus: Stigmella
- Species: S. microtheriella

Binomial name
- Stigmella microtheriella (Stainton, 1854)

Synonyms
- Nepticula microtheriella Stainton, 1854

= Stigmella microtheriella =

Species of moth

Stigmella microtheriella, the Hazel leaf miner moth, is a moth of the family Nepticulidae. It is found in Asia, Europe and New Zealand. The larvae mine the leaves of hazel (Corylus species) and hornbeams (Carpinus species). It was described by the English entomologist, Henry Tibbats Stainton in 1854 from a type specimen found in England.

== Taxonomy ==
This species was first described by Henry T. Stainton in 1854 and originally named Nepticular microtheriella. It was subsequently placed in the genus Stigmella. The female type specimen is held at the Natural History Museum, London.

== Description ==
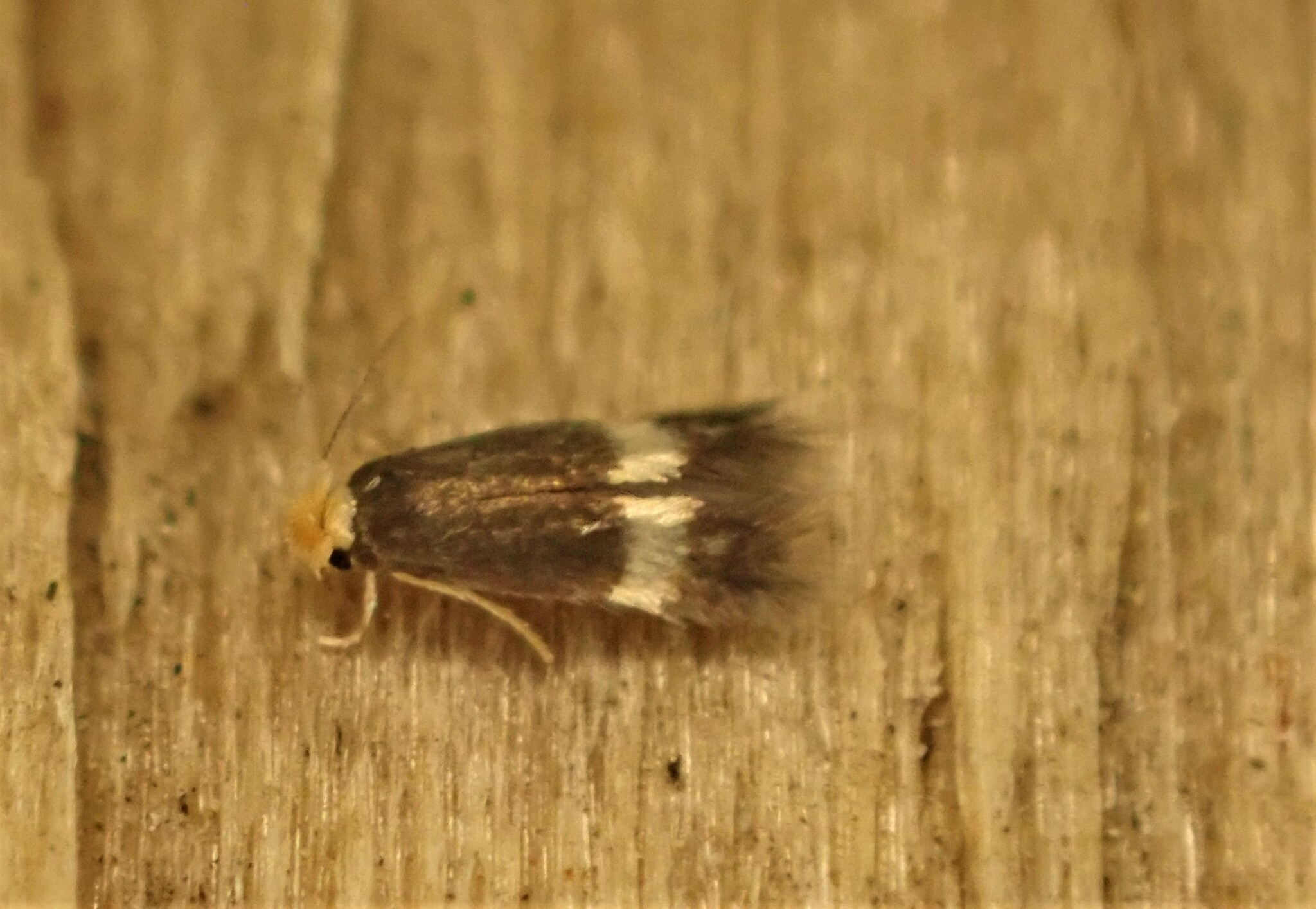
S. microtheriella in New Zealand.

The wingspan is 3–4 millimetres (0.12–0.16 in).The head is ochreous-yellowish, the collar ochreous-whitish. The antennal eyecaps are ochreous-whitish. The forewings are purplish-fuscous with a rather oblique shining whitish fascia beyond middle. The apical area beyond this is darker and more purple. The hindwings are grey.

Adults are on wing in May and again in August. The moths are parthenogenetic.

Egg

Laid on the underside of a leaf, usually near a rib on hazel (Corylus avellana) and sometimes hornbeam (Carpinus betulus). Other recorded host are Oriental hornbeam (Carpinus orientalis), Turkish hazel (Corylus colurna), the filbert (Corylus maxima), European hop-hornbeam (Ostrya carpinifolia) and American hophornbeam (Ostrya virginiana).

Larvae

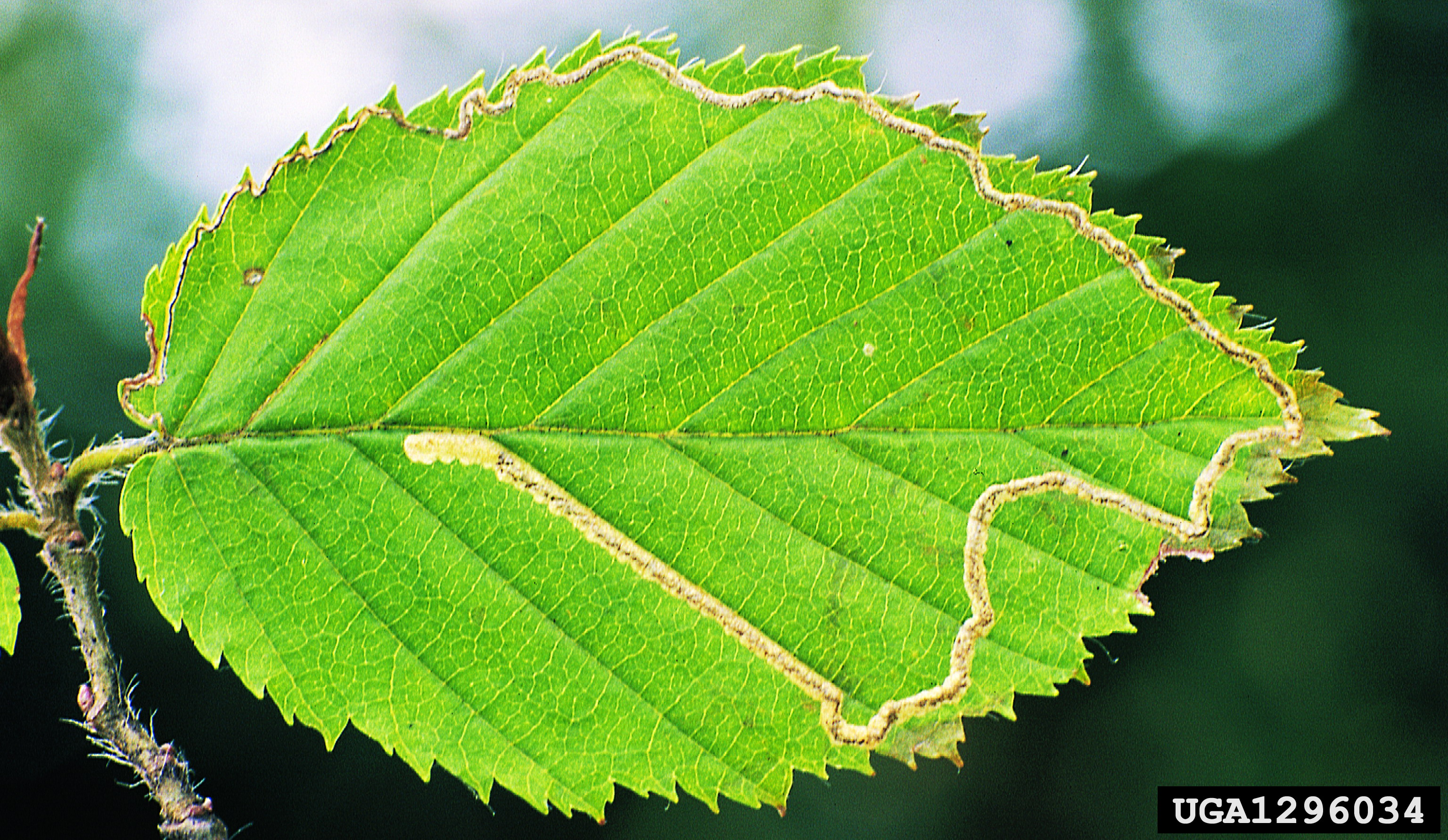
Stigmella microtheriella mine

Yellow with a bright green gut; the head is light brown. They feed venter (belly) upwards. The mines are narrow and often angular and the linear frass fills less than half of the mine. The mine widens gradually but is never wider than the width of the larva.

Cocoon

Yellowish brown or pinkish on the ground.

== Distribution ==
This species is found in all of Europe. It is also present in the eastern Palearctic realm and the Australasian realm, where it is found in New Zealand.

S. microtheriella was introduced to New Zealand from Britain between 1850 and 1860 likely as a result of Mr Smith, from Smith's Ford in the Maitai Valley in Nelson, importing hazel trees from Britain. As at 1989 in New Zealand this species has only been observed in Nelson, at the Maitai Valley and at the grounds of Broadgreen Historic House in Stoke. However since this date it has spread throughout the North and South Islands and is regarded as an agricultural pest for those farming Hazel species.

== Etymology ==
The moth was described by Stainton from a specimen found in England, and he assigned the moth to the genus Nepticula, from neptis – a granddaughter; potentially the smallest member of a family and referring to the moths small size. It was later moved to the genus Stigmella. Stigma – ″a brand, a small spot″, from the moths small size, or more likely from a conspicuous, sometimes metallic, fascia on the wings of many of the moths in the genus. When described, the moth was thought to be the smallest, hence microtheriella; micros – small and therion – a little creature.
