= Trifurcula calycotomella =

Scientific classification
- Kingdom: Animalia
- Phylum: Arthropoda
- Class: Insecta
- Order: Lepidoptera
- Family: Nepticulidae
- Genus: Trifurcula
- Species: T. calycotomella

Binomial name
- Trifurcula calycotomella Laštuvka, A. & Z., 1997

Species of moth

Trifurcula calycotomella is a moth of the family Nepticulidae. It was described by A. and Z. Laštuvka in 1997. It was described from Liguria, Italy, but is also found in Spain, France, Croatia and Greece.

The larvae feed on Calicotome spinosa.
