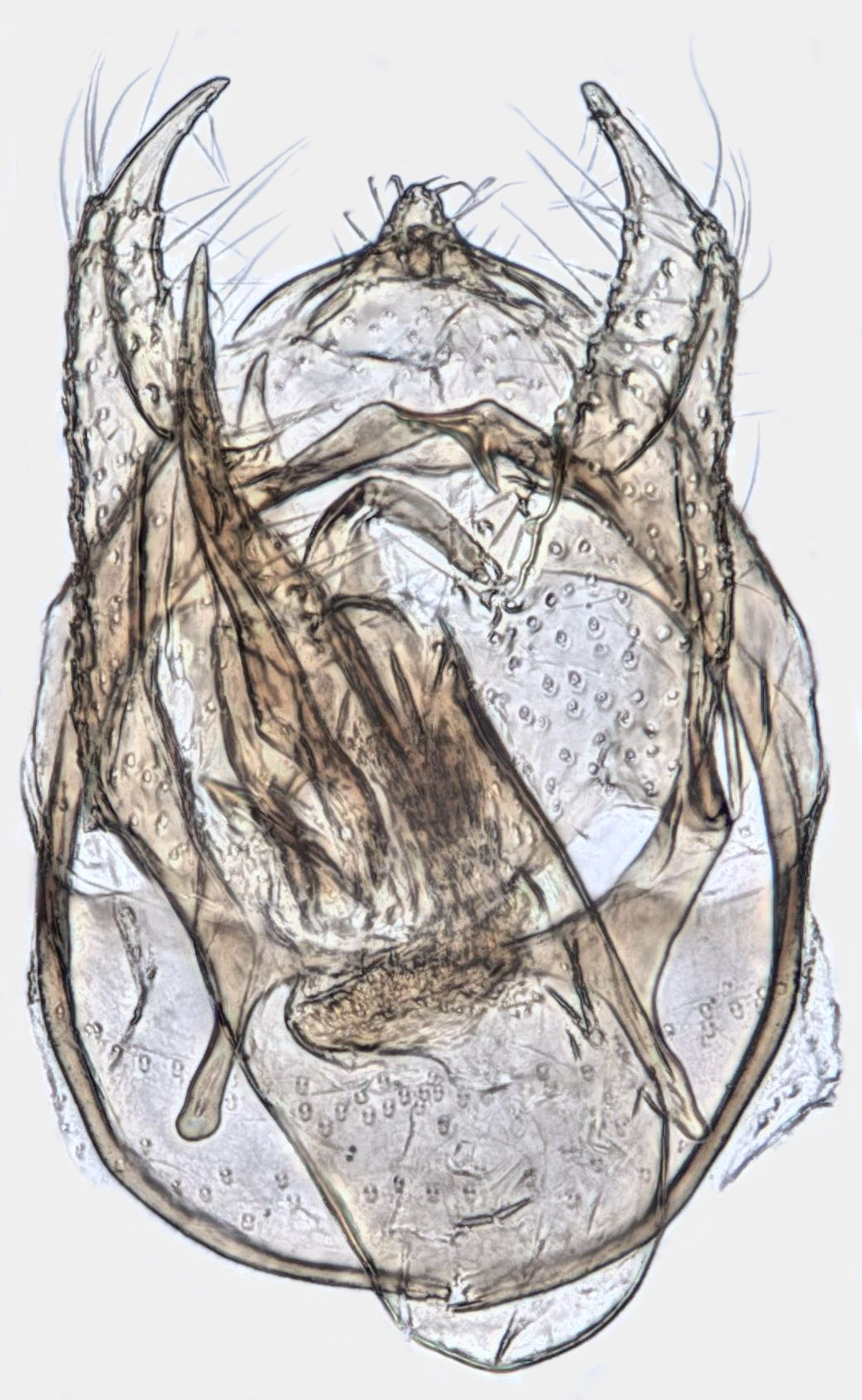
- Trifurcula subnitidella genitalia preparation

Scientific classification
- Kingdom: Animalia
- Phylum: Arthropoda
- Class: Insecta
- Order: Lepidoptera
- Family: Nepticulidae
- Genus: Trifurcula
- Species: T. subnitidella

Binomial name
- Trifurcula subnitidella (Duponchel, 1843)

Synonyms
- Elachista subnitidella Duponchel, [1843]; Trifurcula griseella Wolff, 1957; Nepticula subnitidella

= Trifurcula subnitidella =

Species of moth

Trifurcula subnitidella is a moth of the family Nepticulidae. It is widespread in Europe southward to the northern border of the Sahara in Tunisia and eastward to the Crimea and Asia minor.

The wingspan is 4.2-5.8 mm for males and 4.4-5.4 mm for females. The head hair and collar are both greyish-brown.The eyecaps are white. The antennae are just over half the forewing length. The forewings coarsely scaled and speckled greyish-brown, on the underside the male has an oblong, yellow spot. The hindwings are grey, in the male with a velvety patch of scent scales on the underside Certain identification requires microscopic examination of the genitalia.

Larvae have been found in September and October and adults are on wing from May (March in Tunisia) to early September.

The larvae feed on Lotus corniculatus and possibly other Lotus species. They mine the bark of their host plant. The frass is brown and deposited in a central line. Pupation takes place outside of the mine.
