= Trifurcula pederi =

Scientific classification
- Kingdom: Animalia
- Phylum: Arthropoda
- Class: Insecta
- Order: Lepidoptera
- Family: Nepticulidae
- Genus: Trifurcula
- Species: T. pederi

Binomial name
- Trifurcula pederi Z. & A. Lastuvka, 2007

Species of moth

Trifurcula pederi is a moth of the family Nepticulidae. It is found in Spain.

The wingspan is 4.2-5.8 mm.
