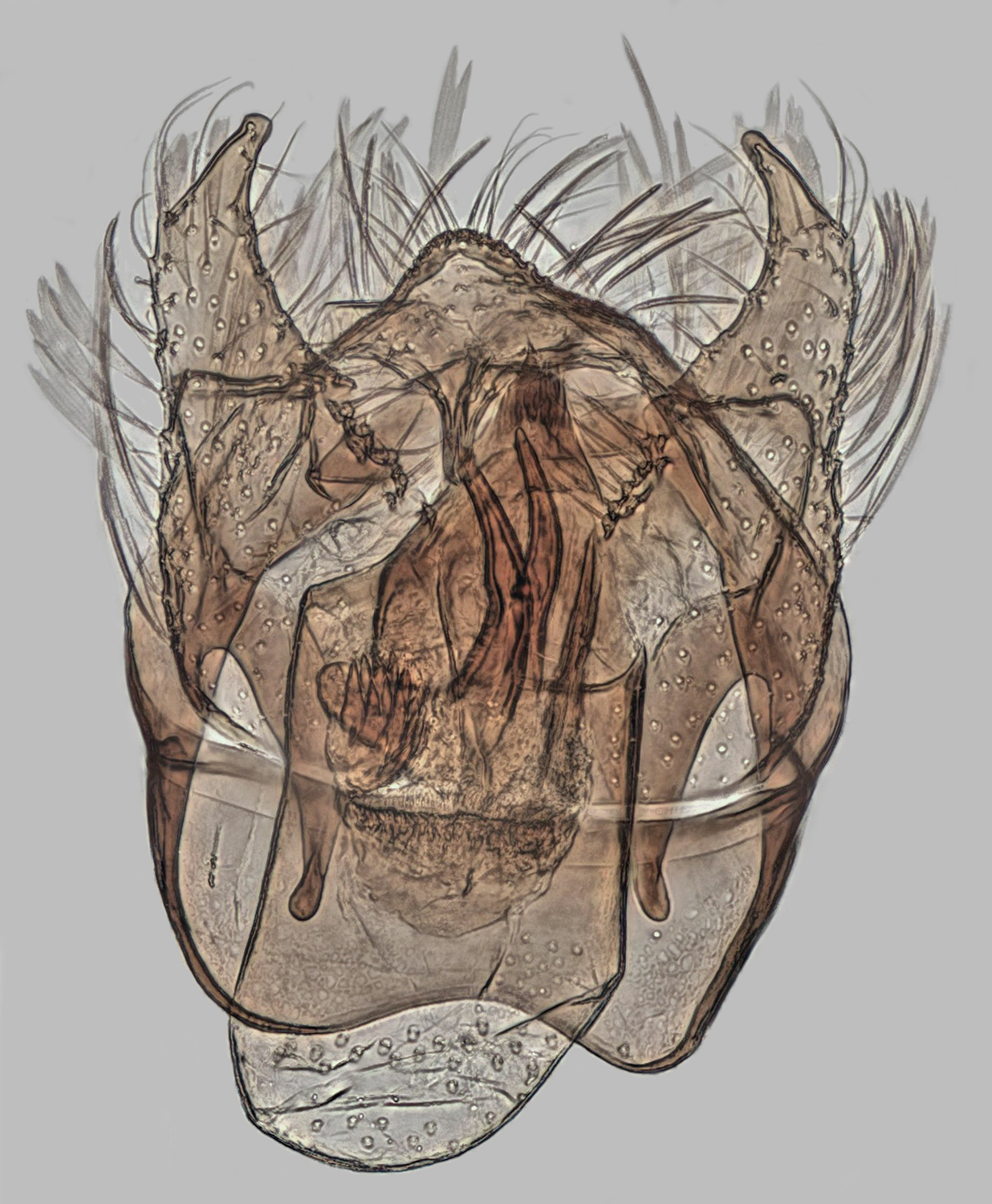
- Genitalia preparation Leafmine
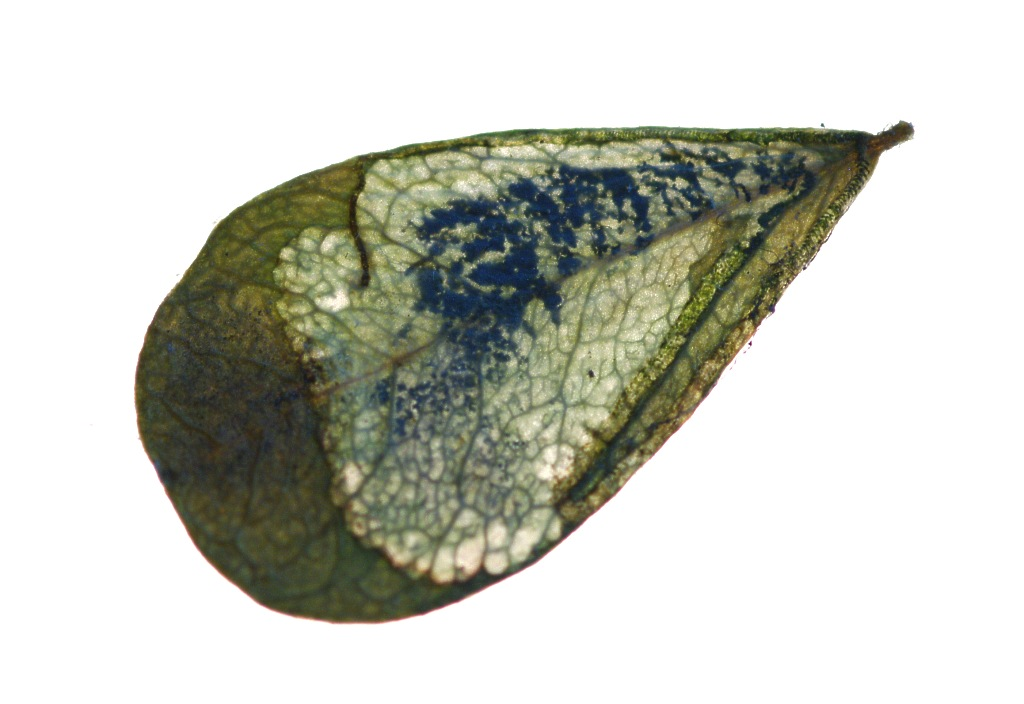
- Trifurcula cryptella Serbia

Scientific classification
- Kingdom: Animalia
- Phylum: Arthropoda
- Clade: Pancrustacea
- Class: Insecta
- Order: Lepidoptera
- Family: Nepticulidae
- Genus: Trifurcula
- Species: T. cryptella

Binomial name
- Trifurcula cryptella (Stainton, 1856)

Synonyms
- Nepticula cryptella Stainton, 1856; Levarchama cryptella; Nepticula trifolii Sorhagen, 1885

= Trifurcula cryptella =

Species of moth

Trifurcula cryptella is a moth of the family Nepticulidae. It is widespread throughout Europe

The wingspan is 4-4.6 mm. The thick erect hairs on the head vertex are ferruginous-yellowish, sometimes mixed with fuscous. The collar is bright yellow. Antennal eyecaps are whitish. The forewings are pale greyish, coarsely irrorated with dark fuscous outer part of cilia whitish-grey. The hindwings are grey. External image Requires microscopic examination of the genitalia for identification.

The larvae feed on Anthyllis montana, Coronilla coronata, Coronilla emerus, Coronilla emerus emeroides, Coronilla varia, Hippocrepis comosa, Lotus corniculatus, Lotus hispidus, Lotus pedunculatus and Lotus uliginosus. They mine the leaves of their host plant.
