= Trifurcula lavandulae =

Scientific classification
- Kingdom: Animalia
- Phylum: Arthropoda
- Class: Insecta
- Order: Lepidoptera
- Family: Nepticulidae
- Genus: Trifurcula
- Species: T. lavandulae

Binomial name
- Trifurcula lavandulae Z. & A. Lastuvka, 2007

Species of moth

Trifurcula lavandulae is a moth of the family Nepticulidae. It is found in Spain and southern France.

The Moth's wingspan is 5-5.6 mm.

The larvae feed on Lavandula angustifolia and Lavandula latifolia. They mine the leaves of their host plant. The mine consists of a narrow upper-surface corridor.
