= Trifurcula beirnei =

Scientific classification
- Kingdom: Animalia
- Phylum: Arthropoda
- Class: Insecta
- Order: Lepidoptera
- Family: Nepticulidae
- Genus: Trifurcula
- Species: T. beirnei

Binomial name
- Trifurcula beirnei Puplesis, 1984

Species of moth

Trifurcula beirnei is a moth of the family Nepticulidae. It is found in Great Britain, Denmark and parts of Germany, Poland, Austria, the Czech Republic, Slovakia and Hungary. It is also found in the Volga and Ural region of Russia.

The wingspan is 8–11 mm. Adults are on wing from the end of June to late September.

The larvae feed on Genista species, including Genista tinctoria, Genista germanica and Genista pilosa.
