= Trifurcula rosmarinella =

Scientific classification
- Kingdom: Animalia
- Phylum: Arthropoda
- Class: Insecta
- Order: Lepidoptera
- Family: Nepticulidae
- Genus: Trifurcula
- Species: T. rosmarinella

Binomial name
- Trifurcula rosmarinella (Chretien, 1914)

Synonyms
- Nepticula rosmarinella Chretien, 1914

Species of moth

Trifurcula rosmarinella is a moth of the family Nepticulidae. It is commonly found in the Mediterranean region, from the Iberian Peninsula to Cyprus.

The larvae feed on Rosmarinus officinalis. They mine the leaves of their host plant.
