= Trifurcula bleonella =

Scientific classification
- Kingdom: Animalia
- Phylum: Arthropoda
- Class: Insecta
- Order: Lepidoptera
- Family: Nepticulidae
- Genus: Trifurcula
- Species: T. bleonella

Binomial name
- Trifurcula bleonella (Chrétien, 1904)

Species of moth

Trifurcula bleonella is a moth of the family Nepticulidae. It was described by Pierre Chrétien in 1904. It is known from the Iberian Peninsula, France, Austria, Croatia, Hungary, the southern part of the Balkan Peninsula, Ukraine, southern Russia and Georgia.

The larvae feed on Linum species, including L. narbonense. They mine the stem of their host plant.
