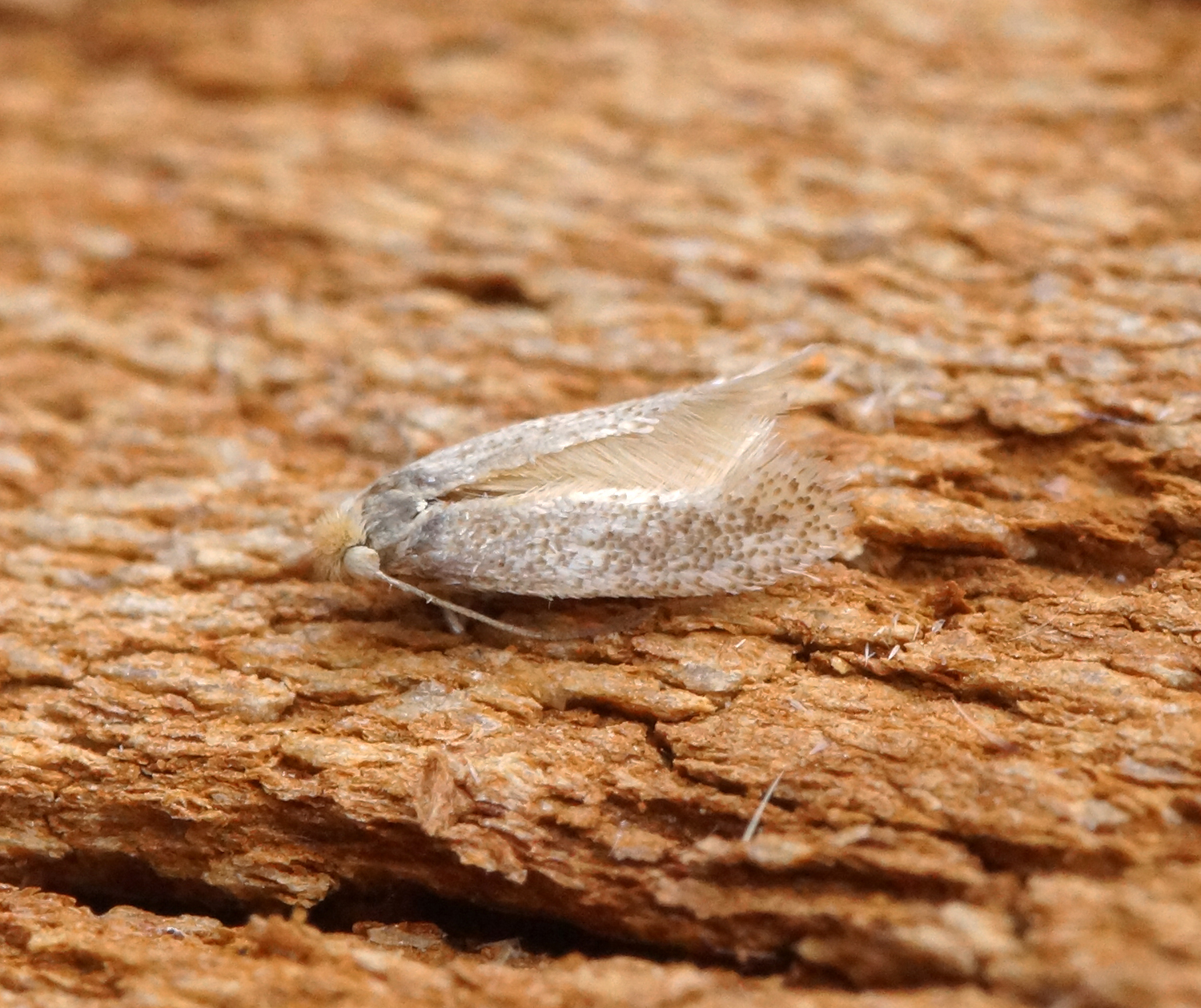

Scientific classification
- Kingdom: Animalia
- Phylum: Arthropoda
- Clade: Pancrustacea
- Class: Insecta
- Order: Lepidoptera
- Family: Nepticulidae
- Genus: Trifurcula
- Species: T. immundella

Binomial name
- Trifurcula immundella (Zeller, 1839)

Synonyms
- Lyonetia immundella Zeller, 1839

= Trifurcula immundella =

Broom pygmy moth

Species of moth

Trifurcula immundella, the broom pygmy moth, is a moth of the family Nepticulidae. It is found in western Europe, wherever the host plant occurs.

The wingspan is 6–8.4 mm. The thick erect hairs on the head vertex are ferruginous-yellowish, sometimes mixed with fuscous. The collar is rust brown. The antennal eyecaps are whitish. The forewings are ochreous-grey-whitish, coarsely irrorated with fuscous. The hindwings are grey. External image

Adults are on wing from June to August.

The larvae feed on Cytisus scoparius.
