= Trifurcula montana =

Scientific classification
- Kingdom: Animalia
- Phylum: Arthropoda
- Class: Insecta
- Order: Lepidoptera
- Family: Nepticulidae
- Genus: Trifurcula
- Species: T. montana

Binomial name
- Trifurcula montana Z. Lastuvka, A. Lastuvka & Van Nieukerken, 2007

Species of moth

Trifurcula montana is a moth of the family Nepticulidae. It is found in Spain and Sardinia.

The wingspan is 5.6-7.2 mm for males and 5.8-7.8 mm for females.

Adults have been collected at light from April to July in the mountains of Spain and Sardinia, between 600 and 2,000 meters above sea level, always close to Thymus vulgaris, the possible host plant.
