= Trifurcula teucriella =

Scientific classification
- Kingdom: Animalia
- Phylum: Arthropoda
- Class: Insecta
- Order: Lepidoptera
- Family: Nepticulidae
- Genus: Trifurcula
- Species: T. teucriella

Binomial name
- Trifurcula teucriella (Chretien, 1914)

Synonyms
- Nepticula teucriella Chretien, 1914

Species of moth

Trifurcula teucriella is a moth of the family Nepticulidae. It is found in southern France and Spain.

The larvae feed on Teucrium chamaedrys. They mine the leaves of their host plant.
