= Trifurcula andalusica =

Scientific classification
- Kingdom: Animalia
- Phylum: Arthropoda
- Class: Insecta
- Order: Lepidoptera
- Family: Nepticulidae
- Genus: Trifurcula
- Species: T. andalusica

Binomial name
- Trifurcula andalusica Z. & A. Lastuvka, 2007

Species of moth

Trifurcula andalusica is a moth of the family Nepticulidae. It is found in the western parts of Andalusia.

The wingspan is 4.6–5 mm.
