= Trifurcula pallidella =

Scientific classification
- Kingdom: Animalia
- Phylum: Arthropoda
- Class: Insecta
- Order: Lepidoptera
- Family: Nepticulidae
- Genus: Trifurcula
- Species: T. pallidella

Binomial name
- Trifurcula pallidella (Duponchel, 1843)

Synonyms
- Oecophora pallidella Duponchel, [1843]; Trifurcula incognitella Toll, 1936

Species of moth

Trifurcula pallidella is a moth of the family Nepticulidae. It is the type species of the genus Trifurcula.

The wingspan is 7.5–9 mm. Adults are on wing from May to early or mid-July. There is one generation per year.

The larvae feed on Chamaecytisus albus, Chamaecytisus austriacus, Chamaecytisus hirsutus, Chamaecytisus ratisbonensis, Chamaecytisus ruthenicus, Cytisus procumbens and Lembotropis nigricans. The larvae make galls on their host plant.
