= Trifurcula sinica =

Scientific classification
- Kingdom: Animalia
- Phylum: Arthropoda
- Class: Insecta
- Order: Lepidoptera
- Family: Nepticulidae
- Genus: Trifurcula
- Species: T. sinica

Binomial name
- Trifurcula sinica (Yang, 1989)

Synonyms
- Sinopticula sinica Yang, 1989

Species of moth

Trifurcula sinica is a moth of the family Nepticulidae. It was described by Yang in 1989. It is known from the Shaanxi in China.

Adults have been recorded in April.

The larvae make galls in young branches of Prunus cerasifera, Prunus dulcis and Prunus persica.
