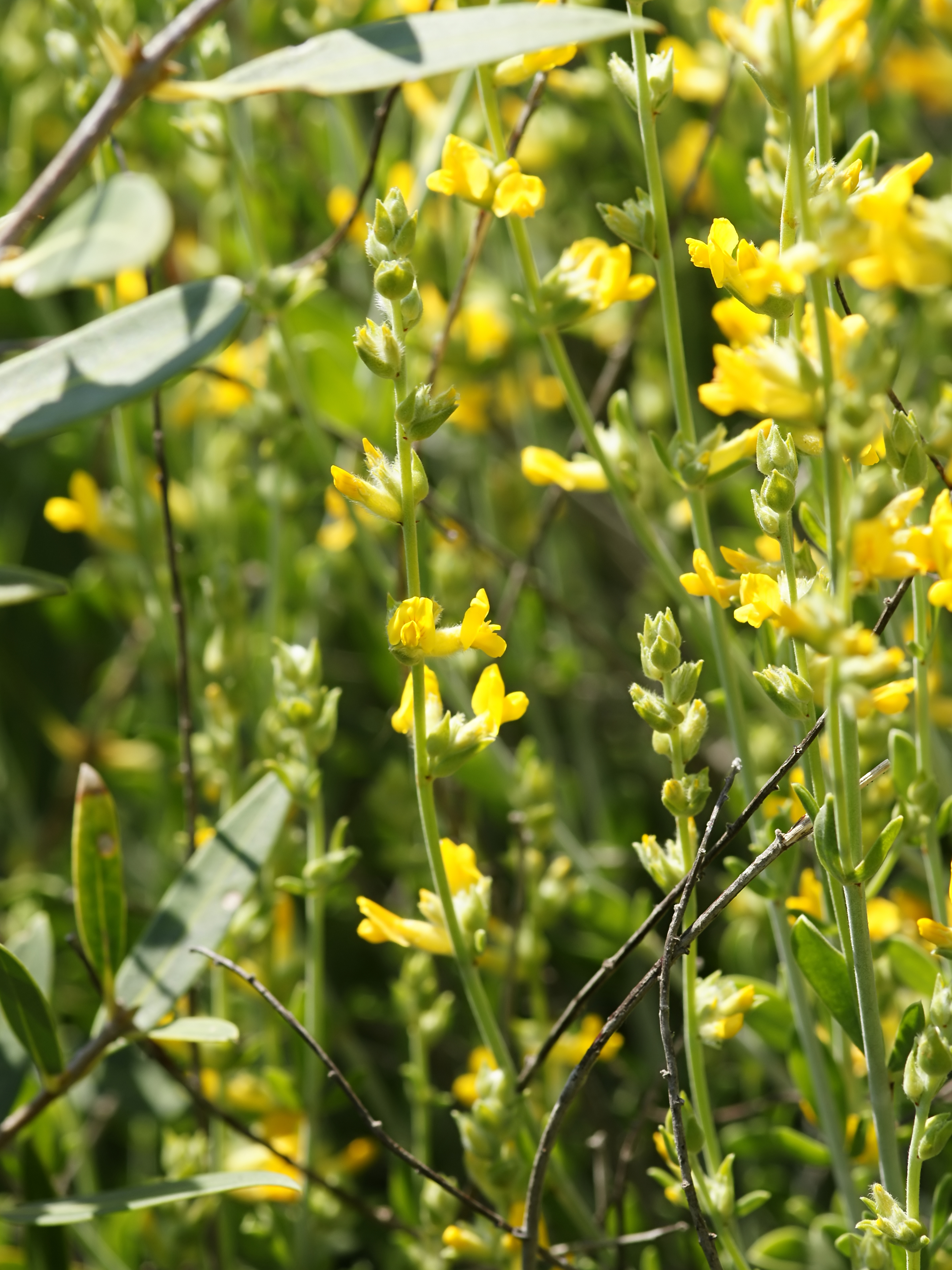

Scientific classification
- Kingdom: Plantae
- Clade: Embryophytes
- Clade: Tracheophytes
- Clade: Angiosperms
- Clade: Eudicots
- Clade: Rosids
- Order: Fabales
- Family: Fabaceae
- Subfamily: Faboideae
- Genus: Anthyllis
- Species: A. cytisoides

Binomial name
- Anthyllis cytisoides L.

= Anthyllis cytisoides =

Albeida

Species of legume

Anthyllis cytisoides is a summer-deciduous shrub of Southern Europe, common in the Balearic Islands and the southeastern coast of the Iberian Peninsula. It prefers semi-arid limestone soils in areas free of frost the year round.
