= Josef Wilhelm Klimesch =

Austrian entomologist

Josef Wilhelm Klimesch (1902 in České Budějovice – 1997 in Linz) was an Austrian entomologist who specialised in lepidoptera. His collection is housed in the Bavarian State Collection of Zoology, Munich.

== Selected works ==
- Klimesch, J. 1950. Contributo alla fauna lepidotterologica del Trentino. Studi trent. Sci. nat. 27: 11-68, 10 pls.
- Klimesch, J. 1953–1954. Die an Caryophyllaceen lebenden europaeischen Gnorimoshcema Busck-Arten. Zeit. Vienna. Ent. Gesel. 38(1953): 225–239, 272–282, 311–319; 39(1954): 273–288, 335–341, 357–362.
- Klimesch, J. 1961. Ordnung Lepidoptera I. Teil: Pyralidina, Tortricina, Tineina, Eriocraniina, und Micropterygina. In Franz, H., Die Nordost-Alpen im Spiegel ihrer Landtierwelt 2: 431–789.
- Klimesch, J. 1968. Die Lepidopteren fauna Mazedoniens, IV Microlepidopteren. Posebno Izd. Prirod. Muz. Skopje 5: 1–203.
