= Erik J. van Nieukerken =

Dutch entomologist and biologist

- Born: Erik Johannes van Nieukerken; 23 February 1952 (age 74); The Hague, Netherlands
- Education: Leiden University
- Known for: Research on Nepticulidae
- Scientific career
- Fields: Entomology, Biology
- Workplaces: Naturalis Biodiversity Center; Vrije Universiteit Amsterdam
- Doctoral advisor: Christopher Foster Wilkinson

Erik Johannes van Nieukerken (born 23 February 1952 in The Hague) is a Dutch entomologist and biologist. His principal research interest is the family of pygmy moths (Nepticulidae).

== Biography ==
Van Nieukerken was named after the protagonist of the 1941 novel Erik, of het klein insektenboek by Dutch writer Godfried Bomans. His father was a pianist. As a teenager, he became a member of the Nederlandse Jeugdbond voor Natuur (Dutch Youth Association for Nature). He studied biology at Leiden University, where, like his fellow student Jan van Tol, he developed an interest in aquatic insects, particularly the family of diving beetles (Dytiscidae). The two frequently collaborated during their studies, conducting surveys of small invertebrates in freshwater habitats throughout the Netherlands.

From 1978 to 1983, van Nieukerken worked at Vrije Universiteit Amsterdam on his doctoral dissertation concerning the taxonomy of the pygmy moth family (Nepticulidae). He was awarded a PhD in 1986 under the supervision of Christopher Foster Wilkinson (1938–2017). Together with Henk Dop, he discovered a new sensillum in pygmy moths, which they named sensillum vesiculo-cladum. This research culminated in the publication of the first checklist of the Nepticulidae of the western Palearctic in 1986.

In 1986, van Nieukerken joined the Rijksmuseum van Natuurlijke Historie in Leiden (now the Naturalis Biodiversity Center). He succeeded Jan van Tol as coordinator of the Dutch central office of the European Invertebrate Survey. His initial administrative responsibilities left him with limited opportunities to continue his taxonomic research. In 1999, he succeeded Peter J. van Helsdingen and Alexey Diakonoff as curator of Lepidoptera and arachnids at Naturalis.

The establishment of a molecular laboratory at Naturalis encouraged van Nieukerken to collect material for DNA analysis during extensive fieldwork in different parts of the world. His collecting expeditions included Vietnam, Australia and Borneo, and, from 2010 onwards, the United States, Taiwan, South Korea and Japan. Preliminary molecular results were presented at the International Congress of Entomology in Brisbane in 2004, although they were not yet considered sufficient for a comprehensive publication. Much of his work with co-authors in the early 2000s focused on detailed European faunistics and taxonomic revisions of the western Palearctic genus Acalyptris, as well as the subgenera Trifurcula (Levarchama), Ectoedemia and Zimmermannia.

From 1989 to 2007, van Nieukerken served as editor-in-chief of the scientific journal Tijdschrift voor Entomologie. In 1997, he initiated the publication series Nederlandse Fauna (Dutch Fauna).

== Eponyms ==
Several taxa have been named in honour of van Nieukerken, including the species Scythris nieukerkeni, Leucoptera nieukerkeni, Tactusa nieukerkeni, Cosmopterix nieukerkeni, Acalyptris vannieukerkeni and Gnamptodon nieukerkeni.
