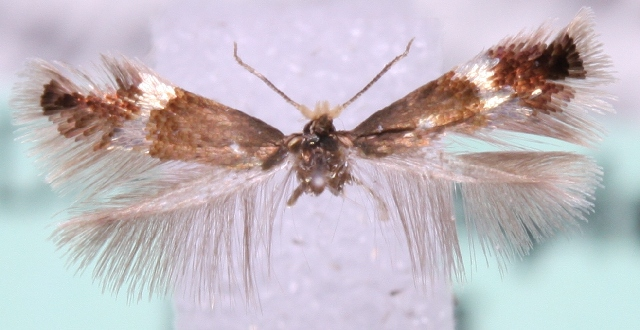

Scientific classification
- Kingdom: Animalia
- Phylum: Arthropoda
- Class: Insecta
- Order: Lepidoptera
- Family: Nepticulidae
- Genus: Stigmella
- Species: S. hemargyrella

Binomial name
- Stigmella hemargyrella (Kollar, 1832)

Synonyms
- Oecophora hemargyrella Kollar, 1832; Nepticula basalella Herrich-Schaffer, 1855; Nepticula fagella Herrich-Schaffer, 1855; Nepticula fagi Frey, 1856; Nepticula fulgens Stainton, 1888; Nepticula nobilella Heinemann & Wocke, 1876

= Stigmella hemargyrella =

Species of moth

Stigmella hemargyrella is a moth of the family Nepticulidae. It is found in most of Europe, except Iceland, Norway, Finland, Portugal and most of the Baltic region.

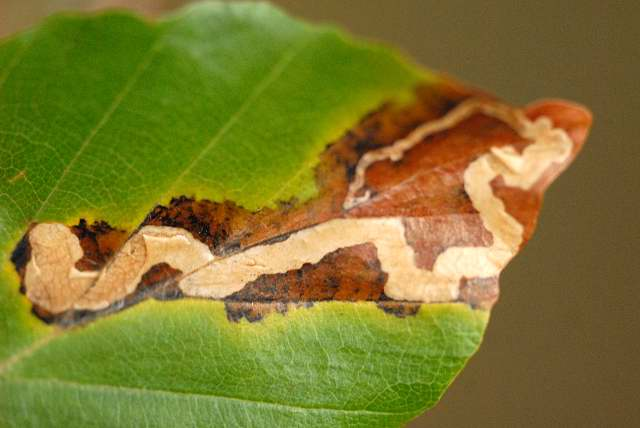
Stigmella hemargyrella mine

The wingspan is 5–6 mm. The head is light ochreous-yellowish. The antennal eyecaps are whitish. The forewings are deep shining bronzy with a golden-tinged silvery-metallic hardly oblique fascia at 2/3.The apical area beyond this is dark purple-fuscous. The cilia round apex beyond a blackish median line are white. The hindwings are rather dark grey.

The moths (imago) are bivoltine flying from April to May and again from July to August and can be found resting on trunks. The egg can be laid on either side of the leaf and the pale yellowish-white larva feed, within a mine on Fagus sylvatica and Fagus sylvatica orientalis. The mine is a sinuous gallery and at the early state is relatively narrow with a central line of dark frass. As the larva grow the mine becomes wider and in the middle portion the frass is arranged in a series of arcs or coils. The mine can cross the vein (compare Stigmella tityrella which rarely crosses the veins) and in the final stages of the mine the frass is more irregular and concentrated in the centre of the gallery.
