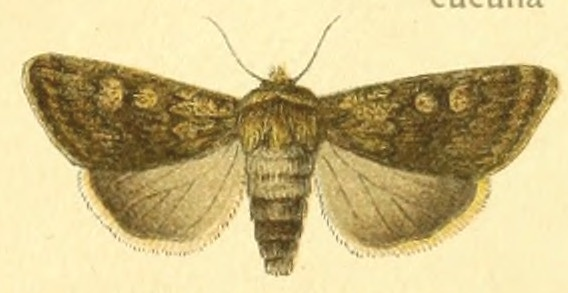

Scientific classification
- Kingdom: Animalia
- Phylum: Arthropoda
- Clade: Pancrustacea
- Class: Insecta
- Order: Lepidoptera
- Superfamily: Noctuoidea
- Family: Noctuidae
- Genus: Euxoa
- Species: E. culminicola

Binomial name
- Euxoa culminicola (Staudinger, 1870)

Synonyms
- Agrotis culminicola Staudinger, 1870; Euxoa culminicola f. robiginosa Dannehl, 1929; Euxoa culminicola f. deflavata Feichtenberger, 1962; Euxoa culminicola f. flavata Feichtenberger, 1962; Euxoa culminicola f. demaculata Feichtenberger, 1962; Euxoa culminicola f. dentata Feichtenberger, 1962

= Euxoa culminicola =

Species of moth

Euxoa culminicola is a moth of the family Noctuidae. It is found in the Alps and Pyrenees in Austria, France, Italy, Spain and Switzerland.

== Description ==
Warren states E. culminicola Stgr. (6e). Like simplonia, but larger; the forewing pale fuscous suffused with pale yellow and roughly dusted; orbicular and reniform stigmata diffuse; hindwing with the base paler. Switzerland and the Tyrol. The wingspan is 39–43 mm.

== Biology ==
Euxoa culminicola occurs only in a few places in the Alps and Pyrenees above the tree line at altitudes between 2000 and 3000 meters. way of life There is one generation per year, the moths fly in July and August. The moths are active during the day and at night. They have been observed nectar feeding during the day. The larvae live from September. They overwinter and pupate in May of the following year.
