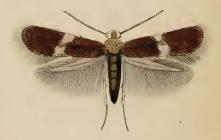

Scientific classification
- Kingdom: Animalia
- Phylum: Arthropoda
- Clade: Pancrustacea
- Class: Insecta
- Order: Lepidoptera
- Family: Nepticulidae
- Genus: Stigmella
- Species: S. myrtillella

Binomial name
- Stigmella myrtillella (Stainton, 1857)

Synonyms
- Nepticula myrtillella Stainton, 1857

= Stigmella myrtillella =

Species of moth

Stigmella myrtillella is a moth of the family Nepticulidae. It is found from Fennoscandia and northern Russia to the Pyrenees, Italy and Bulgaria, and from Ireland to Ukraine.

Mined leaves of Vaccinium myrtillus

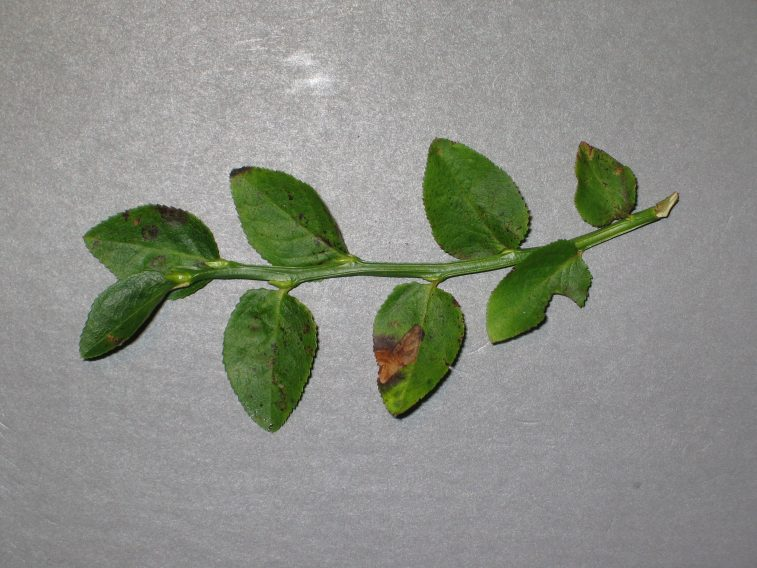
Damage

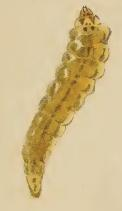
Larva

The wingspan is 5,4-6,3 mm. The head is ferruginous-yellowish, the collar paler. The antennal eyecaps are whitish. The forewings are dark fuscous, faintly purple-tinged with a rather oblique somewhat shining whitish fascia beyond middle. The outer half of cilia ochreous-white. The hindwings are light grey.

Adults are on wing in May and June.

The larvae feed on Vaccinium myrtillus and Vaccinium uliginosum. They mine the leaves of their host plant.
