= Stigmella sanguisorbae =

Scientific classification
- Kingdom: Animalia
- Phylum: Arthropoda
- Clade: Pancrustacea
- Class: Insecta
- Order: Lepidoptera
- Family: Nepticulidae
- Genus: Stigmella
- Species: S. sanguisorbae

Binomial name
- Stigmella sanguisorbae (Wocke, 1865)

Synonyms
- Nepticula sanguisorbae Wocke, 1865

Species of moth

Stigmella sanguisorbae is a moth of the family Nepticulidae. It is found from Germany and Poland to Switzerland, Austria and Hungary.

The larvae feed on Sanguisorba officinalis. They mine the leaves of their host plant.
