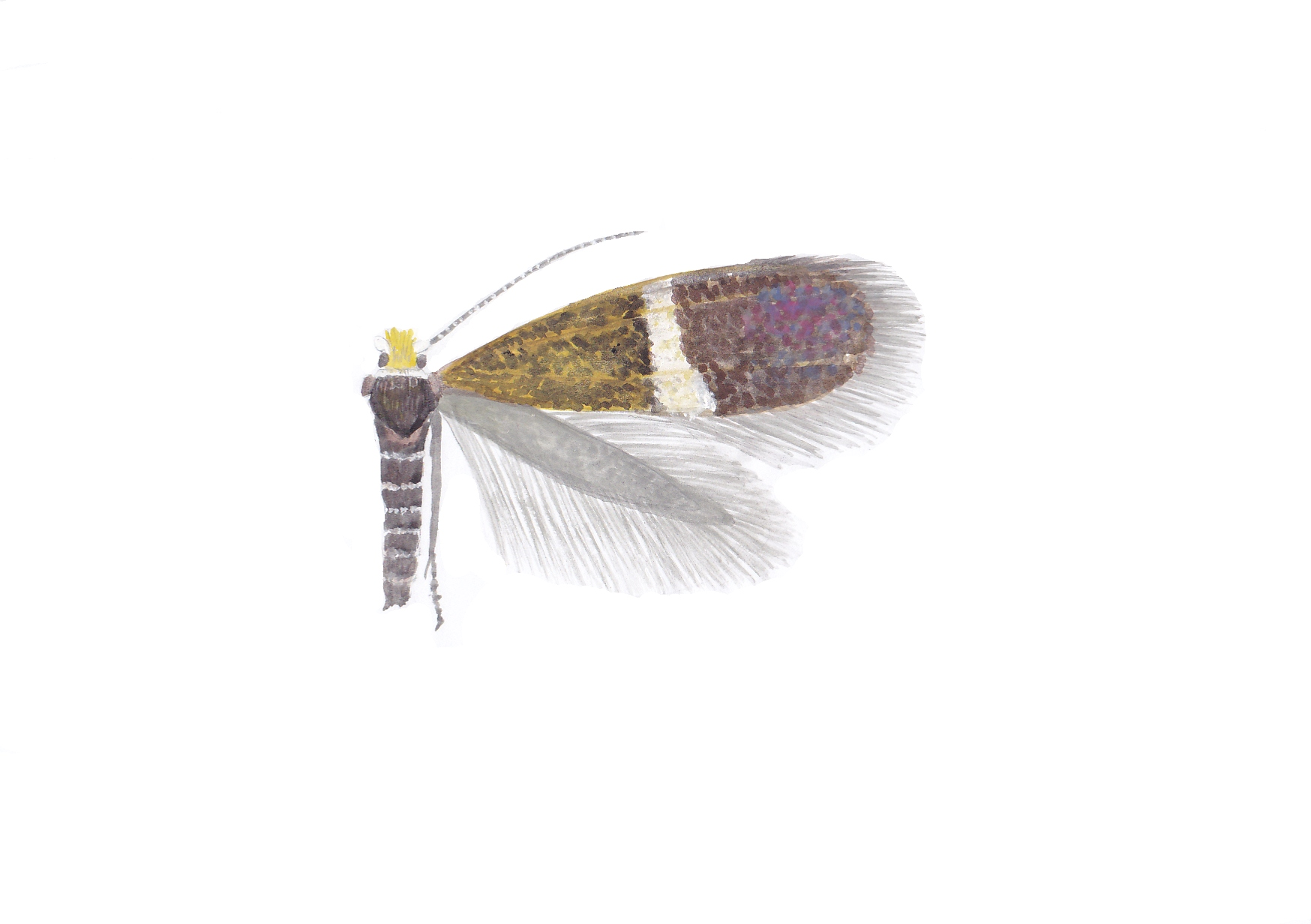
- An image of stigmella carpinella male moth

Scientific classification
- Kingdom: Animalia
- Phylum: Arthropoda
- Clade: Pancrustacea
- Class: Insecta
- Order: Lepidoptera
- Family: Nepticulidae
- Genus: Stigmella
- Species: S. carpinella

Binomial name
- Stigmella carpinella (Heinemann, 1862)

Synonyms
- Nepticula carpinella Heinemann, 1862

= Stigmella carpinella =

Species of moth

Stigmella carpinella is a moth of the family Nepticulidae. It is found in from Sweden to Belgium, the Alps, Croatia and Bulgaria, and from Great Britain to Ukraine.

The wingspan is 5–6 mm. Adults are on wing at the end of April.

The larvae feed on Carpinus betulus, Carpinus orientalis and Ostrya carpinifolia. They mine the leaves of their host plant.
