= Stigmella naturnella =

Scientific classification
- Kingdom: Animalia
- Phylum: Arthropoda
- Clade: Pancrustacea
- Class: Insecta
- Order: Lepidoptera
- Family: Nepticulidae
- Genus: Stigmella
- Species: S. naturnella

Binomial name
- Stigmella naturnella (Klimesch, 1936)

Synonyms
- Nepticula naturnella Klimesch, 1936; Astigmella dissona Puplesis, 1984

Species of moth

Stigmella naturnella is a moth of the family Nepticulidae. It is found in the Czech Republic, Slovakia, Austria, Hungary, Italy and central and eastern Russia.

There are two generations per year.

The larvae feed on Betula species. They mine the leaves of their host plant.
