= Stigmella eberhardi =

Scientific classification
- Kingdom: Animalia
- Phylum: Arthropoda
- Class: Insecta
- Order: Lepidoptera
- Family: Nepticulidae
- Genus: Stigmella
- Species: S. eberhardi

Binomial name
- Stigmella eberhardi (Johansson, 1971)

Synonyms
- Nepticula eberhardi Johansson, 1971

Species of moth

Stigmella eberhardi is a moth of the family Nepticulidae. It is widespread in the Mediterranean region, north to southern central Europe. It has been recorded from the Czech Republic and Slovakia, Austria, Hungary, south-eastern France, Spain, Portugal, Italy, Sardinia, Slovenia, Croatia, Macedonia, Greece and Turkey.

The wingspan is 4.9-6.8 mm. Adults are on wing from April to September. There are two generations per year.

The larvae feed on Quercus ilex, Quercus petraea, Quercus pubescens, Quercus pyrenaica, Quercus robur and Quercus suber. They mine the leaves of their host plant.
