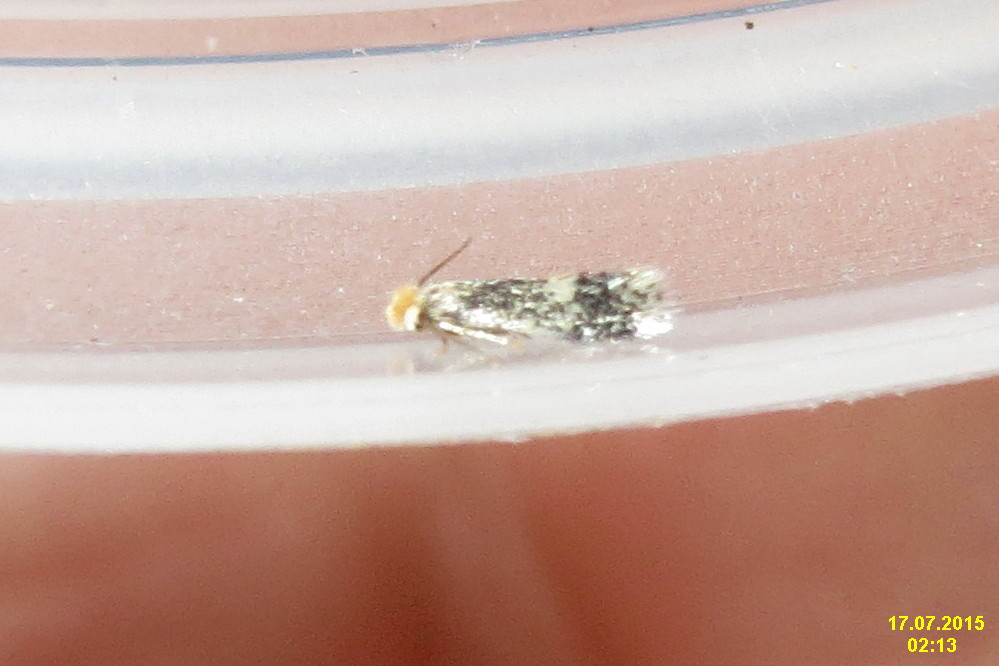

Scientific classification
- Kingdom: Animalia
- Phylum: Arthropoda
- Clade: Pancrustacea
- Class: Insecta
- Order: Lepidoptera
- Family: Nepticulidae
- Genus: Ectoedemia
- Species: E. hannoverella

Binomial name
- Ectoedemia hannoverella (Glitz, 1872)

Synonyms
- Nepticula hannoverella Glitz, 1872

= Ectoedemia hannoverella =

Species of moth

Ectoedemia hannoverella is a moth of the family Nepticulidae found in Asia and Europe. The larva mines the leaves of poplars causing a small gall in the petiole.

== Description ==
The wingspan is 6–7 mm. The moth is easily confused with Ectoedemia turbidella, both species having a white discal spot in the basal part of the forewing and many scattered white scales on a dark ground. The genitalia differ. They are on wing from April to May in western Europe.

The larvae feed on Italian poplar (Populus x canadensis) and black poplar (Populus nigra). They mine the leaves of their host plant, only feeding at night. Pupation takes place outside of the mine.

== Distribution ==
It is found in most of Europe (except Ireland) to southern Siberia, but is most common in central Europe. It was not recorded in Great Britain until 2002 when mines were found in the fallen leaves of Italian poplar.

== Gallery ==
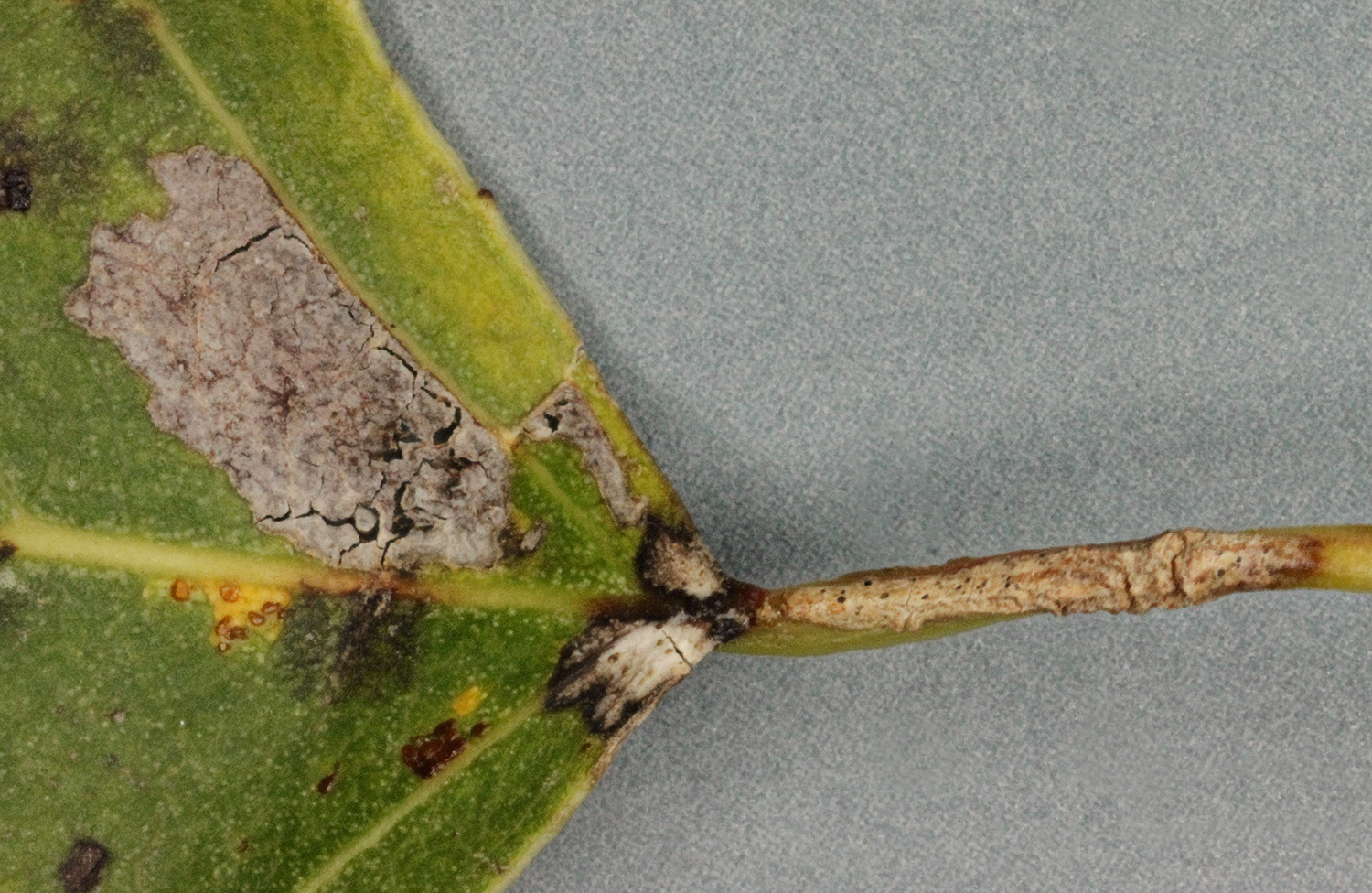

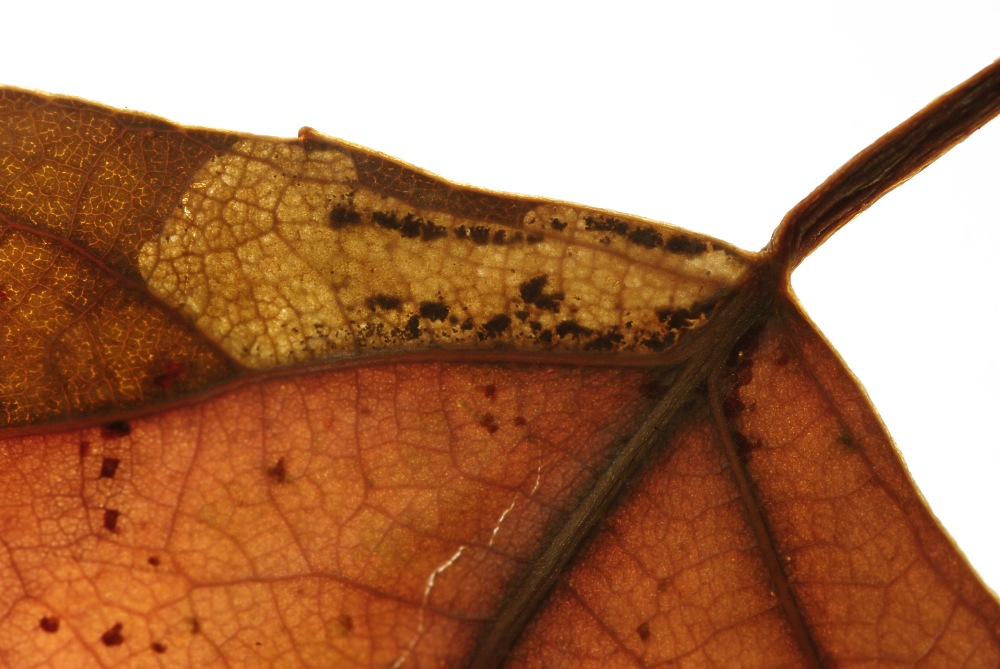

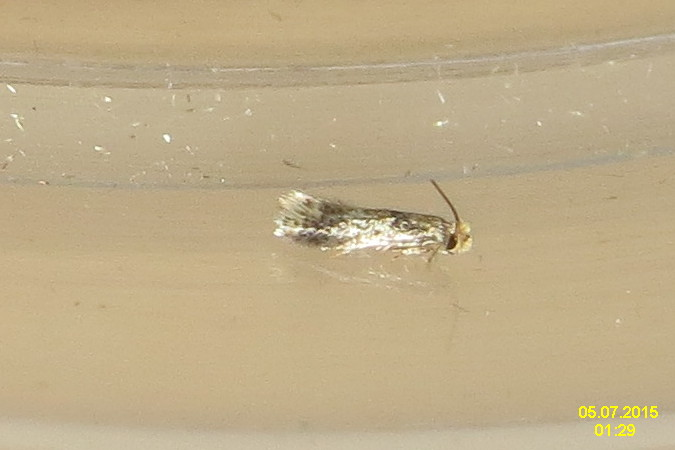
