= Ectoedemia amani =

Scientific classification
- Kingdom: Animalia
- Phylum: Arthropoda
- Class: Insecta
- Order: Lepidoptera
- Family: Nepticulidae
- Genus: Ectoedemia
- Species: E. amani

Binomial name
- Ectoedemia amani Svensson, 1966

Synonyms
- Ectoedemia emendata Puplesis, 1985

Species of moth

Ectoedemia amani is a moth of the family Nepticulidae. It is found in southern Norway, southern Sweden, Denmark (Bornholm and Falster), Austria (Vienna region), and Macedonia.

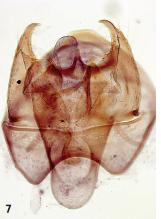
Male genitalia

The wingspan is 7.8-9.8 mm. Adults have been caught in June and July.

The larvae feed on Ulmus species. Unlike most other Nepticulidae species, the larvae mine the bark of their host, rather than the leaves.
