= Stigmella assimilella =

Scientific classification
- Kingdom: Animalia
- Phylum: Arthropoda
- Clade: Pancrustacea
- Class: Insecta
- Order: Lepidoptera
- Family: Nepticulidae
- Genus: Stigmella
- Species: S. assimilella

Binomial name
- Stigmella assimilella (Zeller, 1848)

Synonyms
- Nepticula assimilella Zeller, 1848; Stigmella tremulaefoliella (Sorhagen, 1922)

Species of moth

Stigmella assimilella is a moth of the family Nepticulidae. It is found in most of Europe (except Ireland and the Balkan Peninsula), east through Russia to the eastern part of the Palearctic realm.

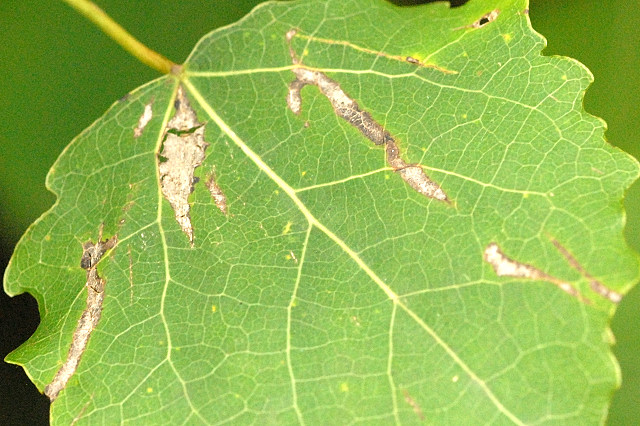
Stigmella assimilella mine

Its wingspan is 5–6 millimetres (0.20–0.24 in). The larvae mine the leaves of their host plant, which typically includes species of aspen including Populus alba, Populus canescens and Populus tremula.
