= Ectoedemia liebwerdella =

Scientific classification
- Kingdom: Animalia
- Phylum: Arthropoda
- Class: Insecta
- Order: Lepidoptera
- Family: Nepticulidae
- Genus: Ectoedemia
- Species: E. liebwerdella

Binomial name
- Ectoedemia liebwerdella Zimmermann, 1940

Species of moth

Ectoedemia liebwerdella is a moth of the family Nepticulidae. It occurs locally in central and southern Europe, east to the Volga and Ural regions of Russia.

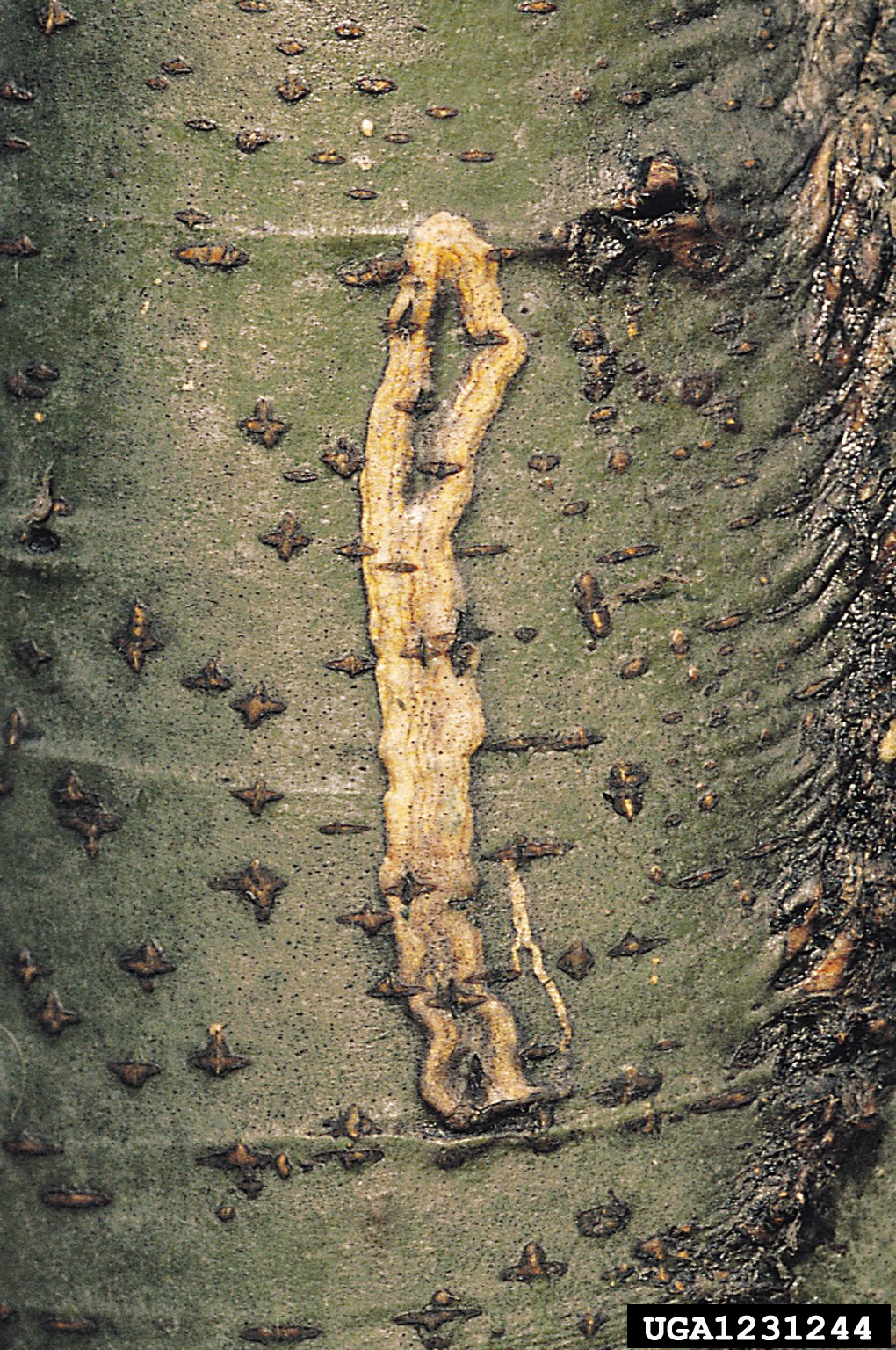
Ectoedemia liebwerdella mine

The wingspan is 6.6–8 mm. The larvae normally have a two-year cycle, they feed during two summers and overwinter twice to pupate in May–July. Adults are on wing from early July to August.

The larvae feed on various Fagus and Quercus species. Unlike most other Nepticulidae species, the larvae mine the bark of their host, rather than the leaves.
