= Stigmella dorsiguttella =

Scientific classification
- Kingdom: Animalia
- Phylum: Arthropoda
- Class: Insecta
- Order: Lepidoptera
- Family: Nepticulidae
- Genus: Stigmella
- Species: S. dorsiguttella

Binomial name
- Stigmella dorsiguttella (Johansson, 1971)

Synonyms
- Nepticula dorsiguttella Johansson, 1971

Species of moth

Stigmella dorsiguttella is a moth of the family Nepticulidae. It is widespread but very local in central, eastern and southern Europe and south-western Asia. It has been recorded from south-eastern Sweden, Germany, Poland, the Czech Republic, Slovakia, Austria, France, Portugal, Spain, Italy, Slovenia, Croatia, Ukraine, Greece and Turkey.

The wingspan is 5–6 mm. Adults are on wing from May to September. There is one generation in the north of its range. There are probably two generations in the south.

The larvae feed on Quercus petraea and Quercus robur. They mine the leaves of their host plant.
