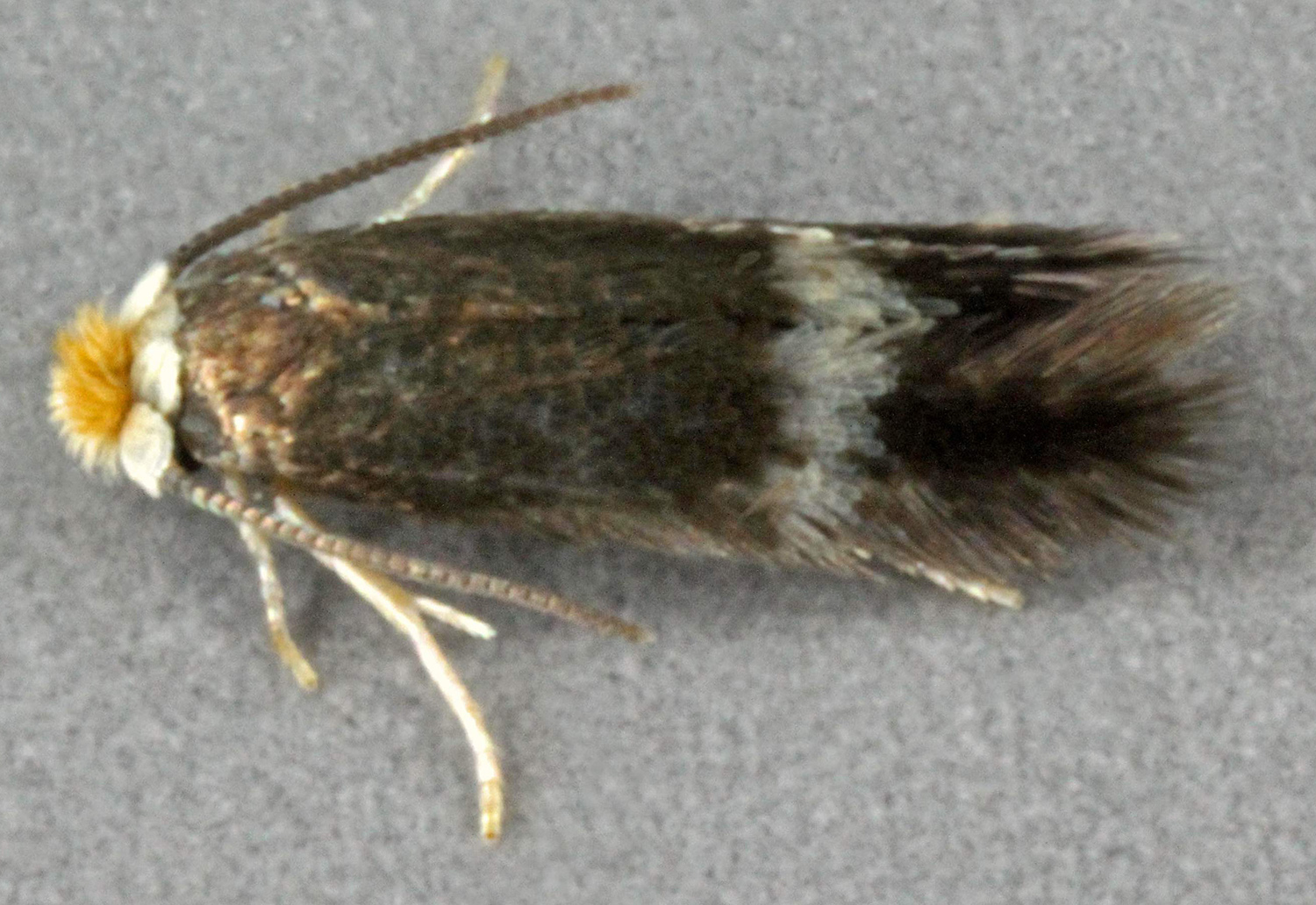

Scientific classification
- Kingdom: Animalia
- Phylum: Arthropoda
- Class: Insecta
- Order: Lepidoptera
- Family: Nepticulidae
- Genus: Stigmella
- Species: S. sakhalinella

Binomial name
- Stigmella sakhalinella Puplesis, 1984

Synonyms
- Stigmella discidia Schoorl & Wilkinson, 1986

= Stigmella sakhalinella =

Species of moth

Stigmella sakhalinella is a moth of the family Nepticulidae. It is found from Scandinavia to the Pyrenees, Italy and Serbia, and from Great Britain to central Russia, east to the eastern part of the Palearctic realm. It is also found in the Near East.

The wingspan is 4-4.6 mm. Adults are on wing in May and again from July to August.

The larvae feed on Betula pendula, Betula pubescens and Betula utilis. They mine the leaves of their host plant. Pupation takes place outside of the mine.
