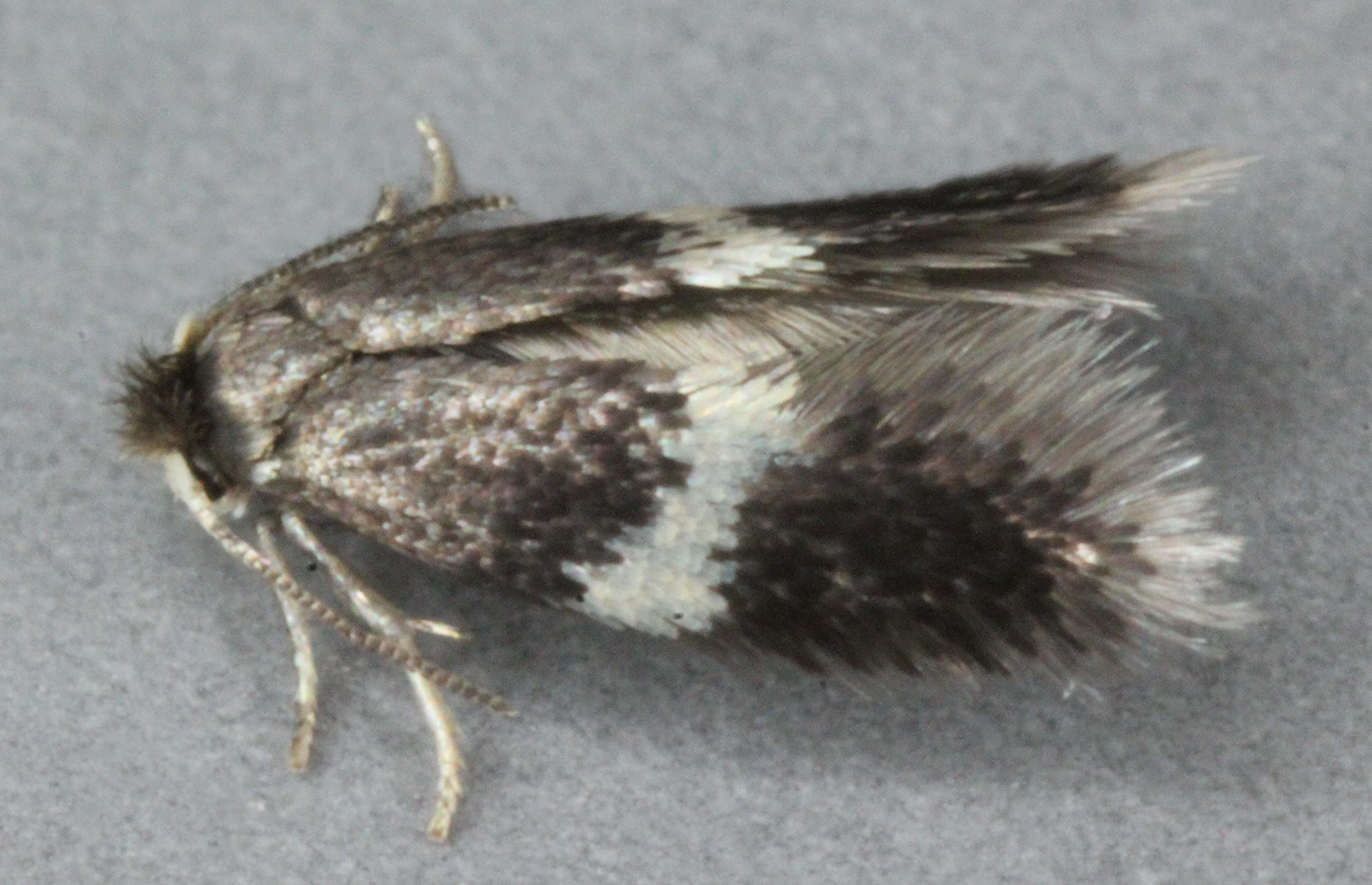
- Ectoedemia minimella, Trawscoed, North Wales

Scientific classification
- Kingdom: Animalia
- Phylum: Arthropoda
- Class: Insecta
- Order: Lepidoptera
- Family: Nepticulidae
- Genus: Ectoedemia
- Species: E. minimella

Binomial name
- Ectoedemia minimella (Zetterstedt, 1839)

Synonyms
- Trifurcula minimella Zetterstedt, 1839; Nepticula viridicola Weber, 1937; Nepticula woolhopiella Stainton, 1887; Nepticula mediofasciella (auct.); Nepticula canadensis Braun, 1914

= Ectoedemia minimella =

Species of moth

Ectoedemia minimella is a moth of the family Nepticulidae. It is widely distributed in the Holarctic.

The wingspan is 5–6 mm. The head hair and collar are black, the eyecups white. The antennae are grey and about half the forewing length. The forewings are black with a silvery transverse band. The hindwings are grey

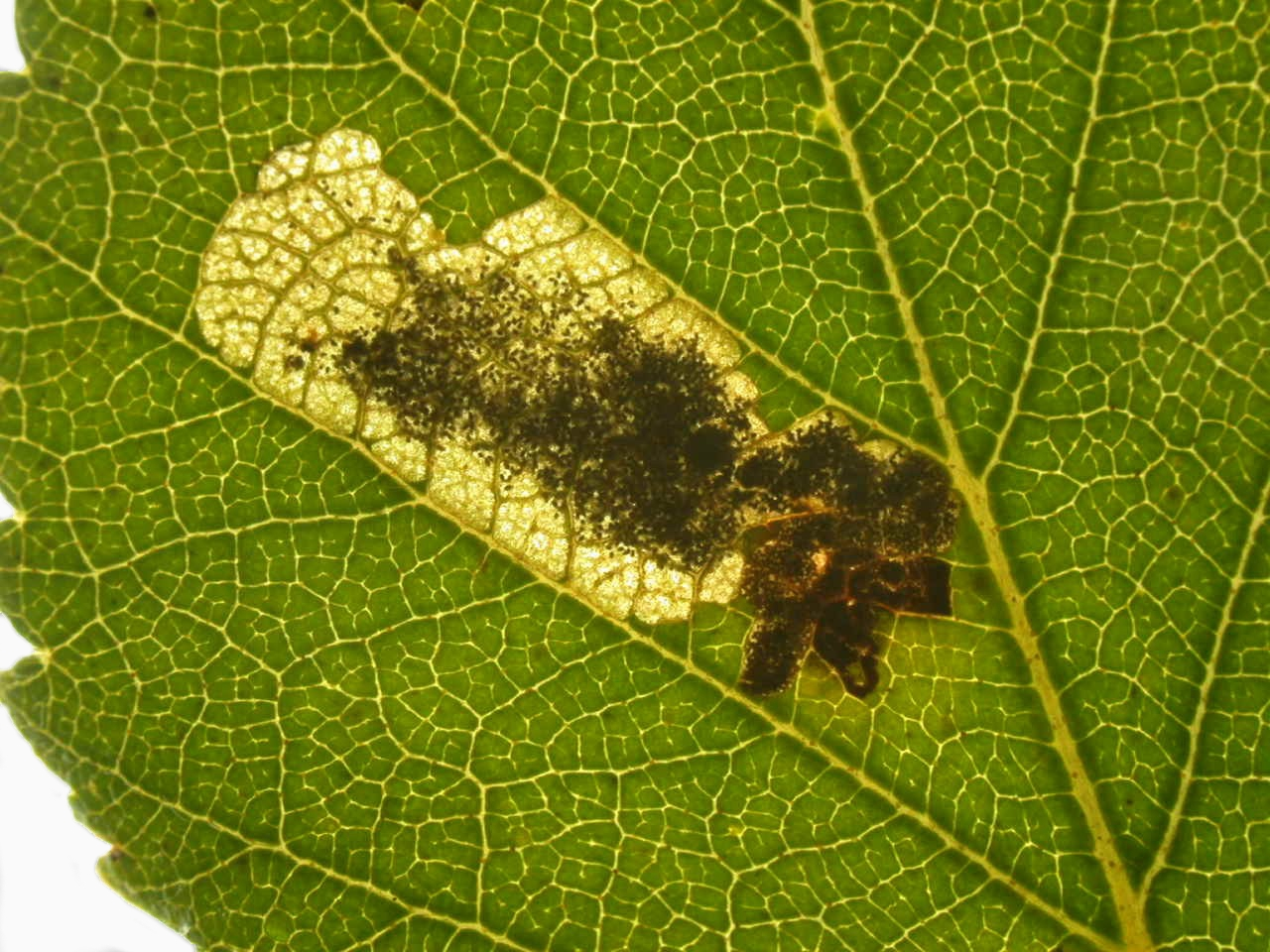
Ectoedemia minimella mine Tir Stent, North Wales

The larvae are leaf miners and feed on species of birch, alder, and hazel. Pupation takes place outside of the mine. Adults are on wing from May to June with one generation per year.

This species was first described by Swedish naturalist Johan Wilhelm Zetterstedt in 1839.
