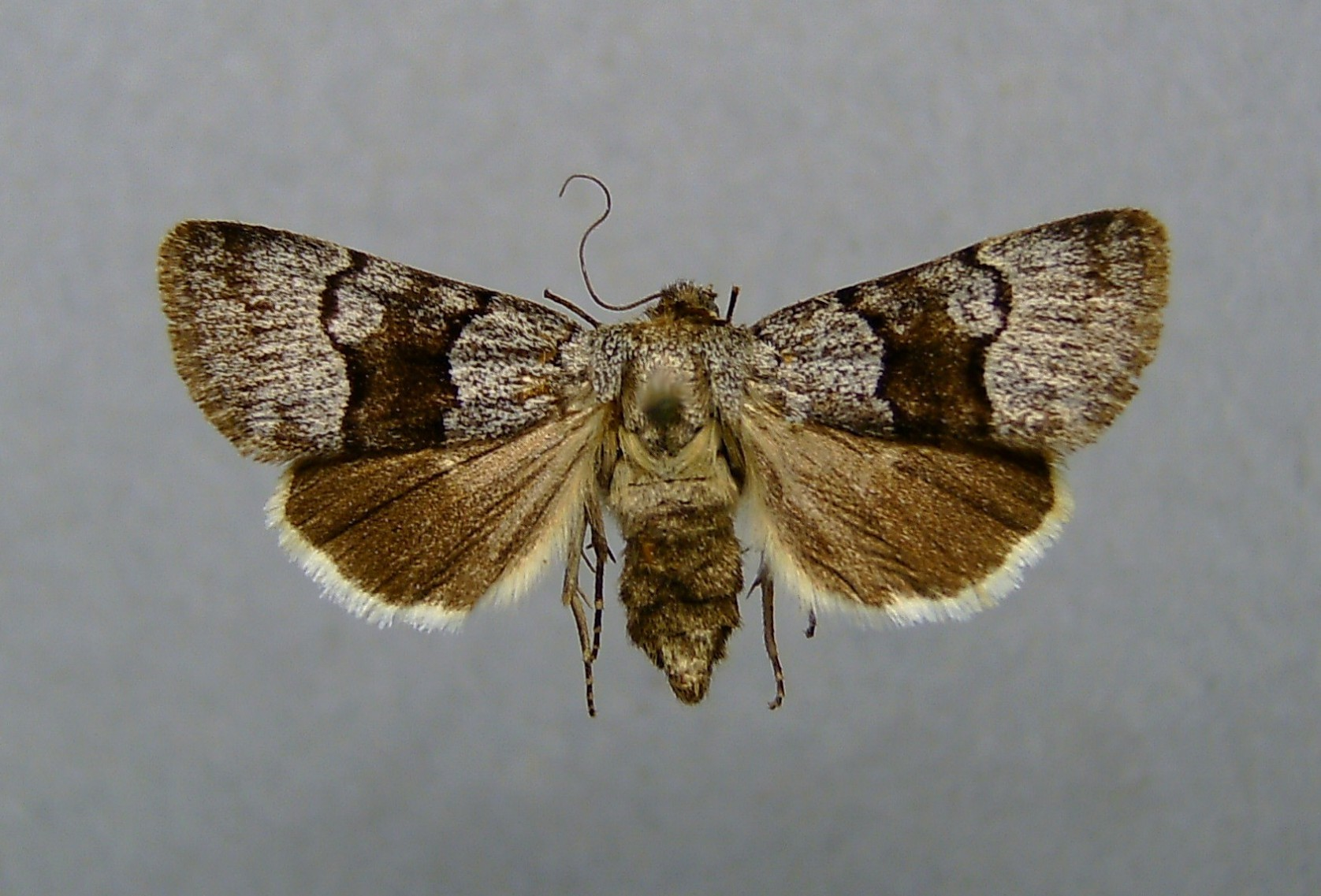

Scientific classification
- Domain: Eukaryota
- Kingdom: Animalia
- Phylum: Arthropoda
- Class: Insecta
- Order: Lepidoptera
- Superfamily: Noctuoidea
- Family: Noctuidae
- Genus: Sympistis
- Species: S. funebris

Binomial name
- Sympistis funebris (Hübner, 1809)

Synonyms
- Noctua funebris Hübner, 1809; Sympistis funesta Paykull, 1793; Homohedena cocklei Dyar, 1904; Homohadena coclei Dyar, 1904

= Sympistis funebris =

Species of moth

Sympistis funebris is a species of moth in the family Noctuidae. It is found in Fennoscandia, the European Alps, northern Russia through Siberia to Japan. It is also found in the northern parts of North America.

The wingspan is 25–27 mm.

The larvae feed on Betula nana and Vaccinium species, including Vaccinium uliginosum.

== Subspecies ==
Sympistis funesta cocklei

- Sympistis funebris funebris
- Sympistis funesta cocklei
