= Stigmella luteella =

Scientific classification
- Kingdom: Animalia
- Phylum: Arthropoda
- Class: Insecta
- Order: Lepidoptera
- Family: Nepticulidae
- Genus: Stigmella
- Species: S. luteella

Binomial name
- Stigmella luteella (Stainton, 1857)

Synonyms
- Nepticula luteella Stainton, 1857

Species of moth

Stigmella luteella is a moth of the family Nepticulidae. It is found in all of Europe, except the Iberian Peninsula and the Balkan Peninsula.

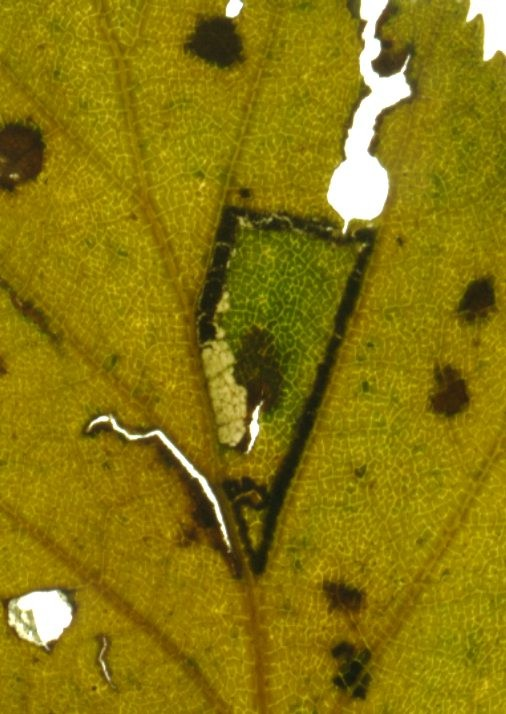
Damage

The wingspan is 4–5 mm.A small bronze-coloured moth. The antennae is filamentous, dark and barely half as long as the forewing. The innermost, greatly expanded joint is white. The head is yellow-haired, the body dark. The forewings are glistening, bronze-brown with a rather broad, silvery-white transverse band at about two-thirds of the wing. The hind wing is narrow, grey, with long fringes. The species is very similar to several other Stigmella species and cannot be determined with certainty from external appearances alone.Microscopic examination of the genitalia is required.

This species has larvae that mine in the leaves of Betula pendula and other birches. The species probably only has one generation each year, the adult butterflies fly in May–June. The larva makes an irregular, 3-4 centimeter long mine in the birch leaf.
