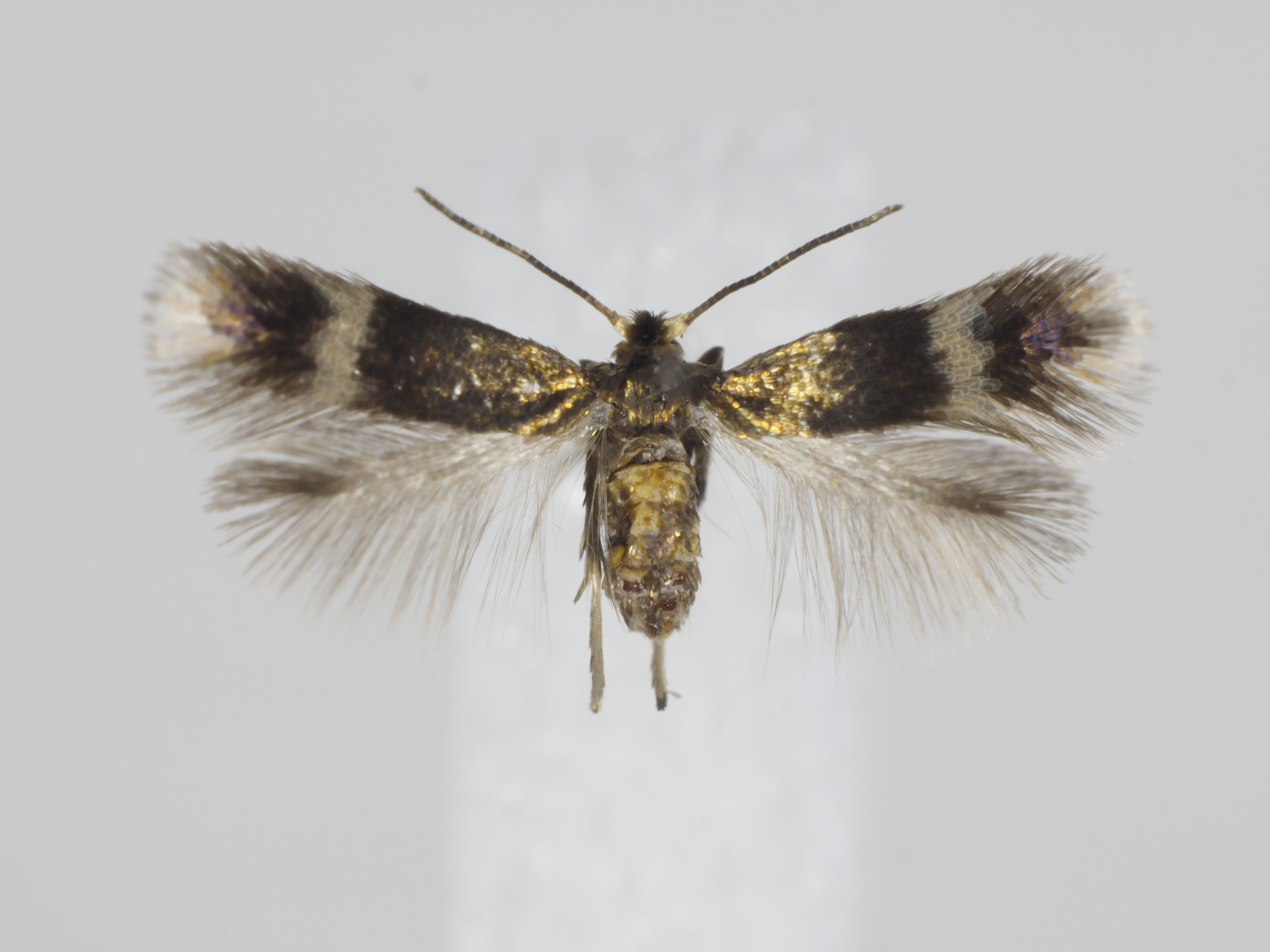

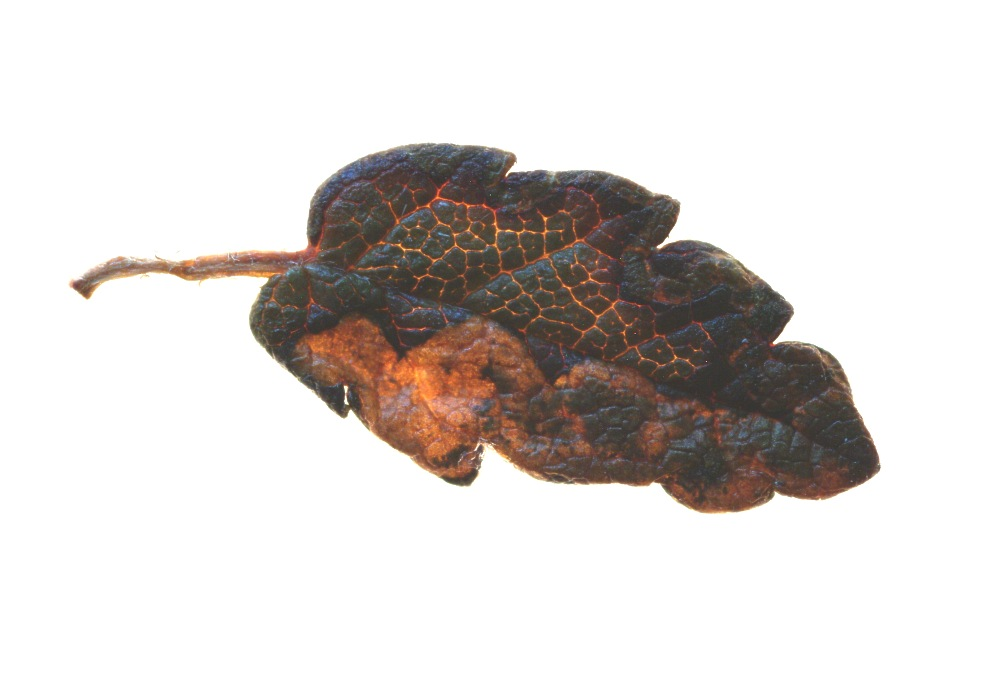

Scientific classification
- Kingdom: Animalia
- Phylum: Arthropoda
- Class: Insecta
- Order: Lepidoptera
- Family: Nepticulidae
- Genus: Stigmella
- Species: S. dryadella

Binomial name
- Stigmella dryadella (O. Hofmann, 1868)

Synonyms
- Nepticula dryadella O. Hofmann, 1868

= Stigmella dryadella =

Species of moth

Stigmella dryadella is a moth of the family Nepticulidae. It is found from Fennoscandia and northern Russia to the Pyrenees and Italy, and from Ireland to Romania.

The wingspan is 4.5-5.5 mm. The greyish-brown antennae are just over half the forewing length. The forewings have a basal greenish sheen, either side of the silvery transverse band they are brown with a purple sheen. The hindwings are grey.

The larvae feed on Dryas octopetala. They mine the leaves of their host plant.
