= Stigmella vimineticola =

Scientific classification
- Kingdom: Animalia
- Phylum: Arthropoda
- Class: Insecta
- Order: Lepidoptera
- Family: Nepticulidae
- Genus: Stigmella
- Species: S. vimineticola

Binomial name
- Stigmella vimineticola (Frey, 1856)

Synonyms
- Nepticula vimineticola Frey, 1856

Species of moth

Stigmella vimineticola is a moth of the family Nepticulidae. It is found from Norway to Spain and Italy, and from France to Slovakia.

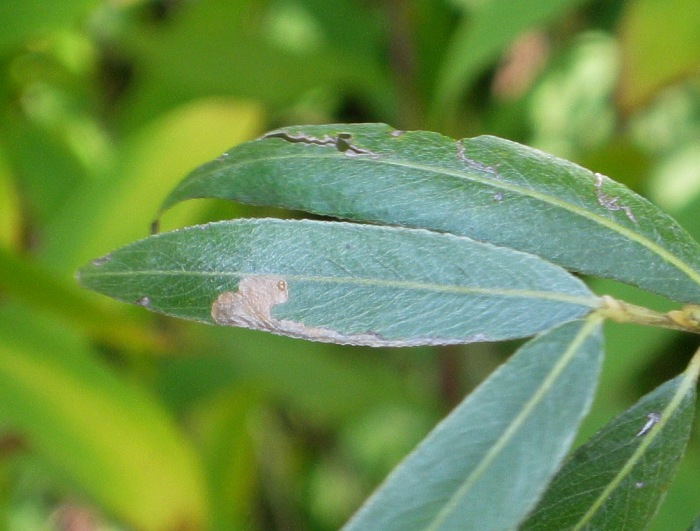
Damage caused by the larvae mining a leaf.

The larvae feed on the leaves of Salix eleagnos and Salix incana. They mine the leaves of their host plant. The mine they produce resembles the mine of Stigmella obliquella.
