= Ectoedemia atrifrontella =

Scientific classification
- Kingdom: Animalia
- Phylum: Arthropoda
- Clade: Pancrustacea
- Class: Insecta
- Order: Lepidoptera
- Family: Nepticulidae
- Genus: Ectoedemia
- Species: E. atrifrontella

Binomial name
- Ectoedemia atrifrontella (Stainton, 1851)

Synonyms
- Trifurcula atrifrontella Stainton, 1851; Zimmermannia heringiella Doets, 1947

Species of moth

Ectoedemia atrifrontella is a moth of the family Nepticulidae. It is found in most of Europe except Iceland, Ireland, Belgium and most of the Balkan Peninsula. It is also present in the Near East.

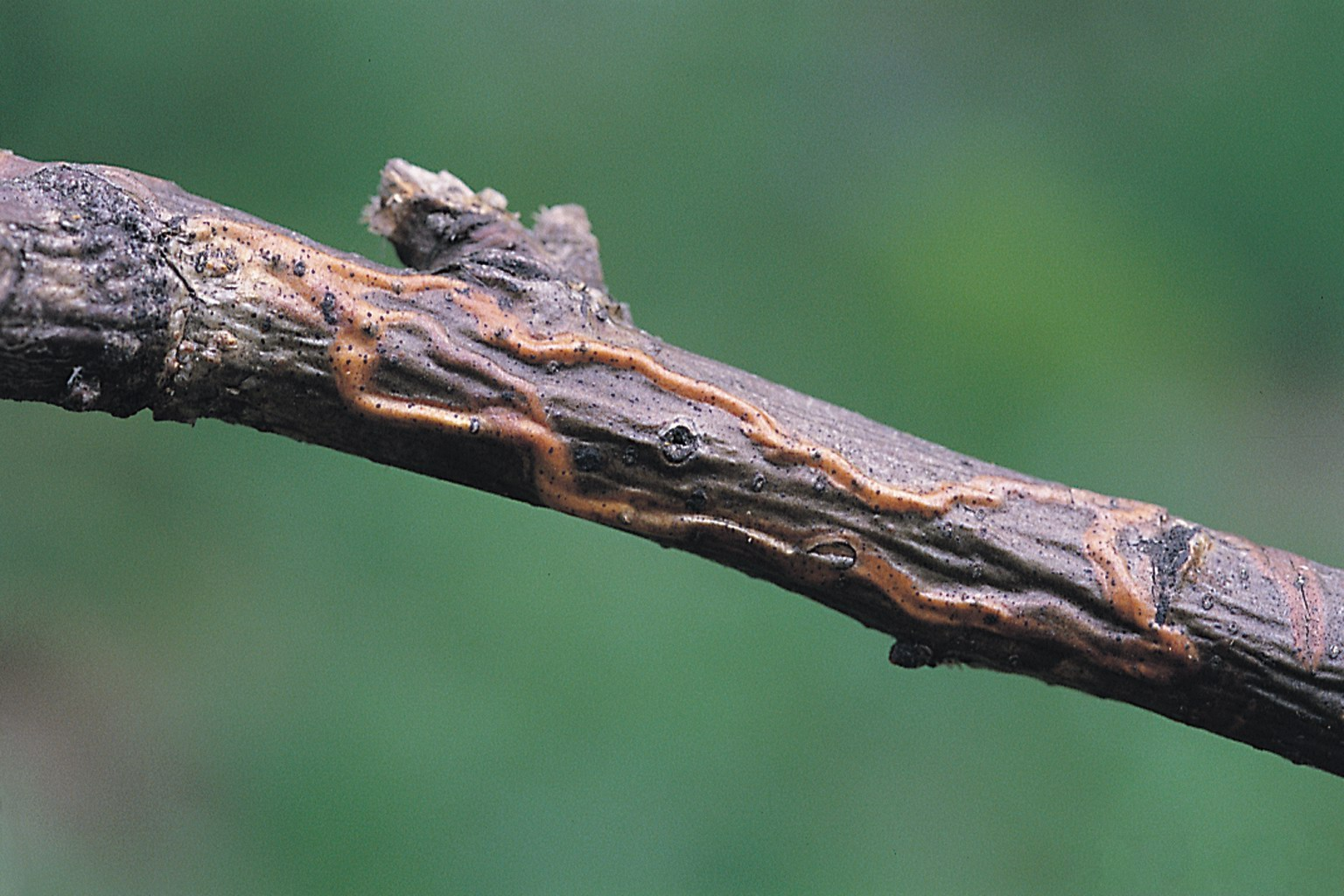
Ectoedemia atrifrontella mine

The wingspan is 7–9 mm. Adults are on wing from June to September.

The larvae feed on various Quercus species. Unlike most other Nepticulidae species, the larvae mine the bark of their host, rather than the leaves.
