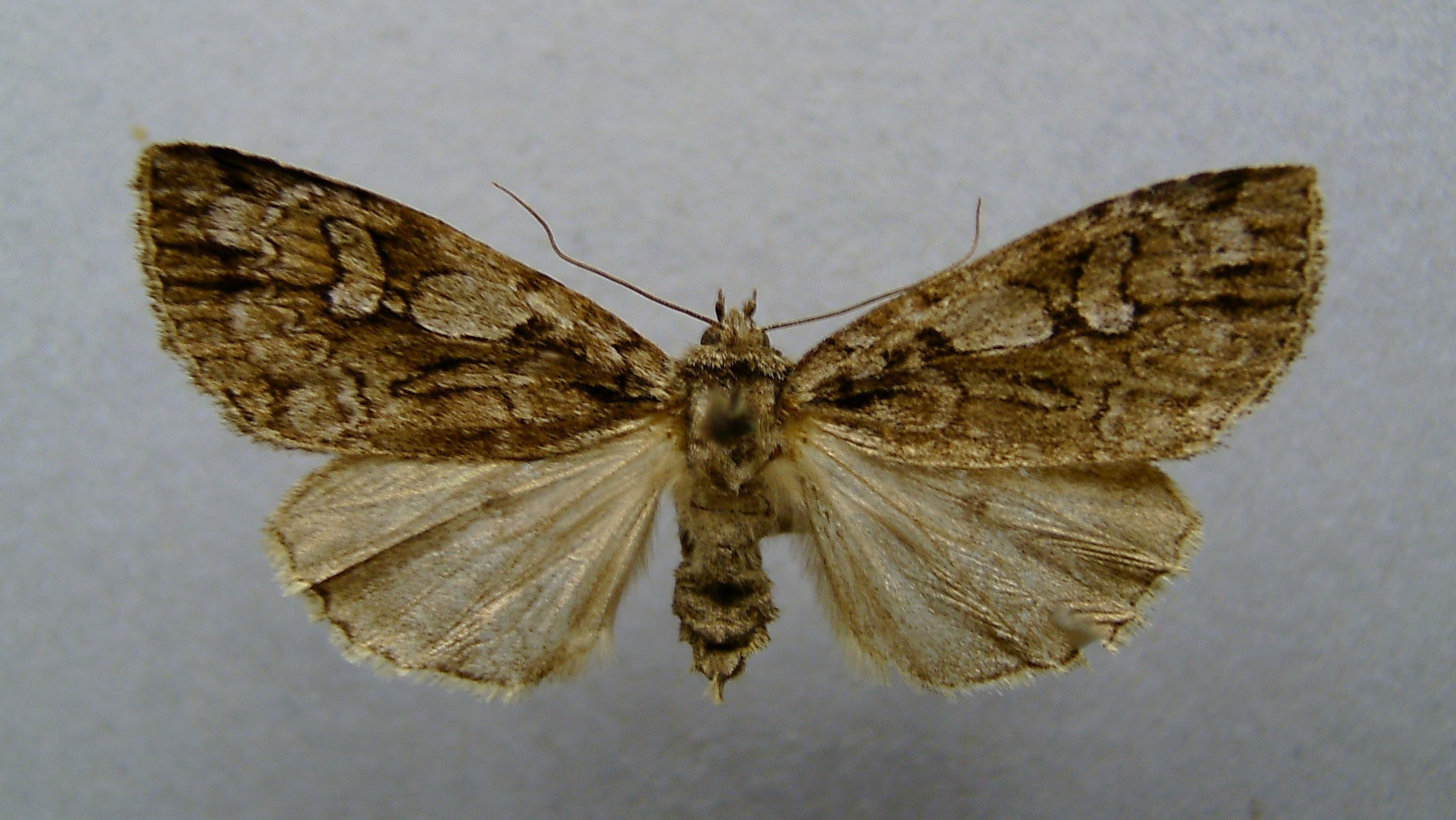

Scientific classification
- Domain: Eukaryota
- Kingdom: Animalia
- Phylum: Arthropoda
- Class: Insecta
- Order: Lepidoptera
- Superfamily: Noctuoidea
- Family: Noctuidae
- Genus: Xestia
- Species: X. rhaetica

Binomial name
- Xestia rhaetica (Staudinger, 1871)

Synonyms
- Agrotis speciosa var. rhaetica Staudinger, 1871; Anomogyna homogena McDunnough, 1921; Anomogyna rhaetica (Staudinger, 1871); Xestia conditoides (Benjamin, 1934); Xestia homogena (McDunnough, 1921); Xestia homogena conditoides (Benjamin, 1934); Xestia obscura Helbig, 1932

= Xestia rhaetica =

Species of moth

Xestia rhaetica is a moth of the family Noctuidae. It is found in northern Europe, central Fennoscandia, northern Russia and further east to Siberia. It is also present in the Tatra Mountains and the Bohemian Forest. In the Alps it is found on altitudes between 1,000 and 2,500 meters, but it is found at sea level in northern Europe. The species is also present in the Nearctic, including New York.

The wingspan is 38–45 mm. Adults are on the wing from July to August in one generation.

The larvae mainly feed on Vaccinium myrtillus.

== Subspecies ==
- Xestia rhaetica rhaetica (Staudinger, 1871) – Alps (except N)
- Xestia rhaetica norica – N Alps (Austria), Tatra
- Xestia rhaetica homogena (McDunnough 1921) (including conditoides)
