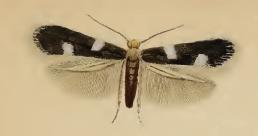

Scientific classification
- Kingdom: Animalia
- Phylum: Arthropoda
- Clade: Pancrustacea
- Class: Insecta
- Order: Lepidoptera
- Family: Nepticulidae
- Genus: Ectoedemia
- Species: E. weaveri

Binomial name
- Ectoedemia weaveri (Stainton, 1855)

Synonyms
- Nepticula weaveri Stainton, 1855; Nepticula weaverella Doubleday, 1859; Fomoria weaveri (Stainton, 1855)

= Ectoedemia weaveri =

Species of moth

Ectoedemia weaveri is a moth of the family Nepticulidae. It is found from Fennoscandia and northern Russia to the Pyrenees and Italy, and from Great Britain through Russia (Baikal, Chita, Yakutia and Magadan regions in eastern Siberia) to Hokkaido in Japan.

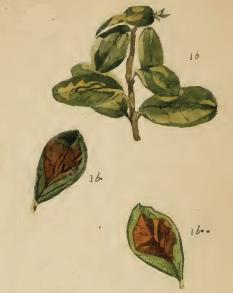
Sprig of Vaccinium vitis-idaea, with a leaf showing a flat mine (1b); upperside of a leaf, with an inflated mine (1b*), and underside of the same leaf (1b**)

Larva

The wingspan is about 7 mm. Adults are on wing from April to August in western Europe.

The larvae feed on Vaccinium vitis-idaea. They mine the leaves of their host plant.
