= Stigmella stelviana =

Scientific classification
- Kingdom: Animalia
- Phylum: Arthropoda
- Class: Insecta
- Order: Lepidoptera
- Family: Nepticulidae
- Genus: Stigmella
- Species: S. stelviana

Binomial name
- Stigmella stelviana (Weber, 1938)

Synonyms
- Nepticula stelviana Weber, 1938; Nepticula crantziella Weber, 1945

Species of moth

Stigmella stelviana is a moth of the family Nepticulidae. It is endemic to the Alps, where it is found at altitudes between 1,900 and 2,600 meters.

The larvae feed on Potentilla crantzii, Potentilla frigida and Potentilla grandiflora. They mine the leaves of their host plant.
