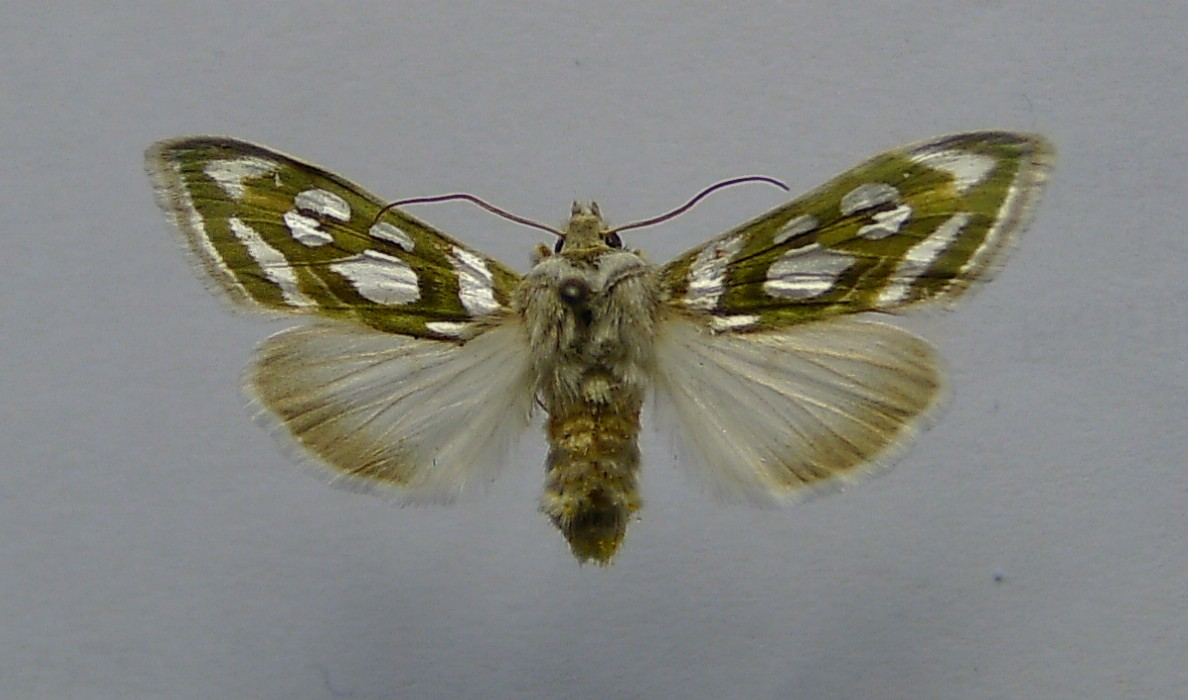

Scientific classification
- Domain: Eukaryota
- Kingdom: Animalia
- Phylum: Arthropoda
- Class: Insecta
- Order: Lepidoptera
- Superfamily: Noctuoidea
- Family: Noctuidae
- Genus: Cucullia
- Species: C. argentea

Binomial name
- Cucullia argentea (Hufnagel, 1766)

= Cucullia argentea =

Species of moth

Cucullia argentea, the green silver-spangled shark, is a moth of the family Noctuidae. The species was first described by Johann Siegfried Hufnagel in 1766. It is found in southern and central Europe through Siberia, Mongolia and Manchuria up to Korea and Japan.

== Technical description and variation ==
The wingspan is 28–34 mm. Forewing olive green, with silvery-white blotches: these are an oblique band near the base, a large blotch below the cell, a submarginal band interrupted above the middle, and a marginal narrow band; orbicular and reniform round and silvery white, the lower half of former and middle of latter obliterated by a darker green streak through cell; fringe white, with grey-green base; hindwing white, becoming greenish fuscous along the termen. ab. subcaerulea Stgr. [subspecies C. a. subcaerulea Staudinger, 1901] (26 a), from western Siberia and western Turkestan, is paler, more bluish green. Larva dull green, with a narrow red-brown or pinkish streak on each segment; dorsal and subdorsal lines yellowish, interrupted by the streaks so as to form spots; spiracular lines yellow; spiracles yellow with black rings; head reddish.

== Biology ==
The moth flies from June to August depending on the location.

The larvae feed on the flowers and seeds of feeds up in autumn on the flowers and seeds Artemisia campestris in sandy localities, and turn to a greenish pupa.
