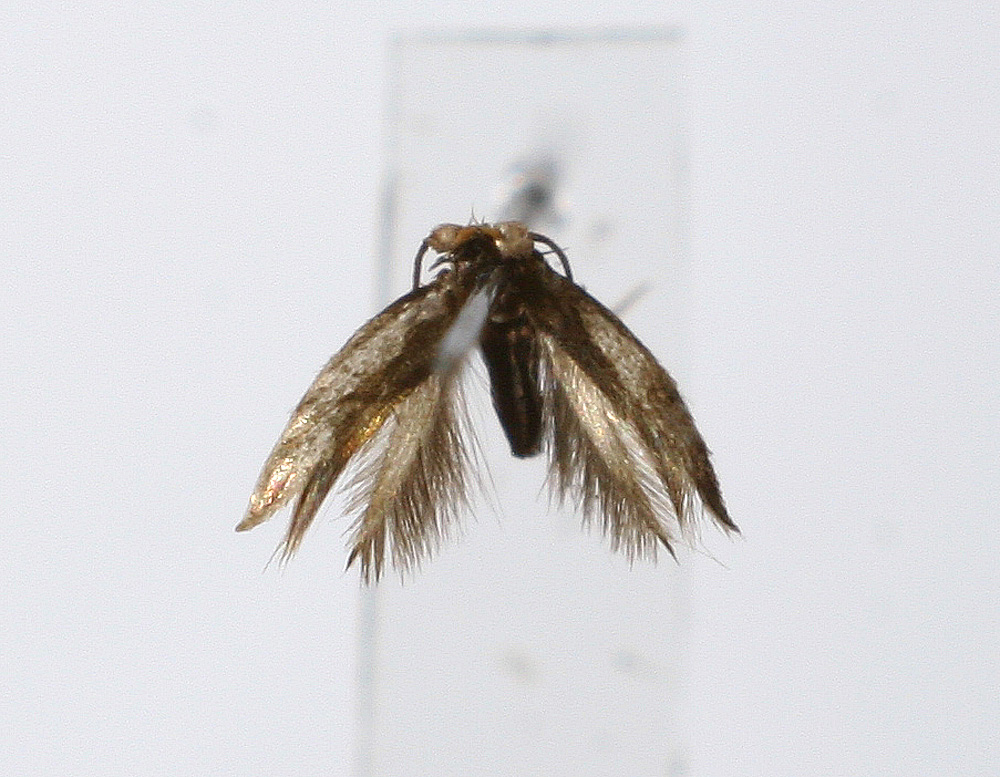

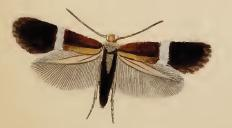

Scientific classification
- Kingdom: Animalia
- Phylum: Arthropoda
- Clade: Pancrustacea
- Class: Insecta
- Order: Lepidoptera
- Family: Nepticulidae
- Genus: Stigmella
- Species: S. alnetella

Binomial name
- Stigmella alnetella (Stainton, 1856)

Synonyms
- Nepticula alnetella Stainton, 1856

= Stigmella alnetella =

Species of moth

Stigmella alnetella is a moth of the family Nepticulidae. It is found in all of Europe, except the Balkan Peninsula.

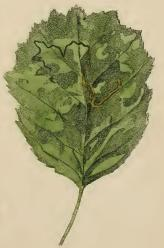
Mined alder leaf

Larva

The wingspan is 3.9-4.8 mm. The head is orange, the collar deep bronze-fuscous. The antennal eyecaps are white. The forewings are golden brown, becoming lighter golden towards the dorsum anteriorly. A bright shining silvery fascia beyond middle is preceded by a dark purplish-fuscous suffusion, the apical area beyond this is dark purplish fuscous. The hindwings are grey.

The larvae feed on Alnus cordata and Alnus glutinosa. They mine the leaves of their host plant. There is usually only one mine in a leaf. Pupation takes place outside of the mine.
