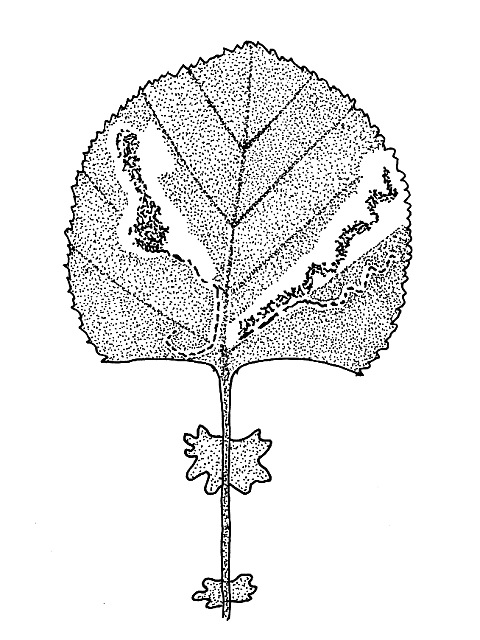
- Stigmella geimontani

Scientific classification
- Kingdom: Animalia
- Phylum: Arthropoda
- Clade: Pancrustacea
- Class: Insecta
- Order: Lepidoptera
- Family: Nepticulidae
- Genus: Stigmella
- Species: S. geimontani

Binomial name
- Stigmella geimontani Klimesch, 1940

= Stigmella geimontani =

Species of moth

Stigmella geimontani is a moth of the family Nepticulidae. It is found in the Dachstein area, a group of mountains in the north-eastern parts of the Alps.

The wingspan is 5.5–6 millimetres (0.22–0.24 in).

The larvae feed on Geum montanum.
