= Stigmella regiella =

Scientific classification
- Kingdom: Animalia
- Phylum: Arthropoda
- Class: Insecta
- Order: Lepidoptera
- Family: Nepticulidae
- Genus: Stigmella
- Species: S. regiella

Binomial name
- Stigmella regiella (Herrich-Schaffer, 1855)

Synonyms
- Nepticula regiella Herrich-Schaffer, 1855; Nepticula corvimontana Hering, 1935

Species of moth

Stigmella regiella is a moth of the family Nepticulidae. It is found in most of Europe (except Iceland, Ireland, Portugal, Norway, Finland, the Baltic region and the southern part of the Balkan Peninsula), east to the eastern part of the Palearctic realm.

The wingspan is 4.5–5 mm.

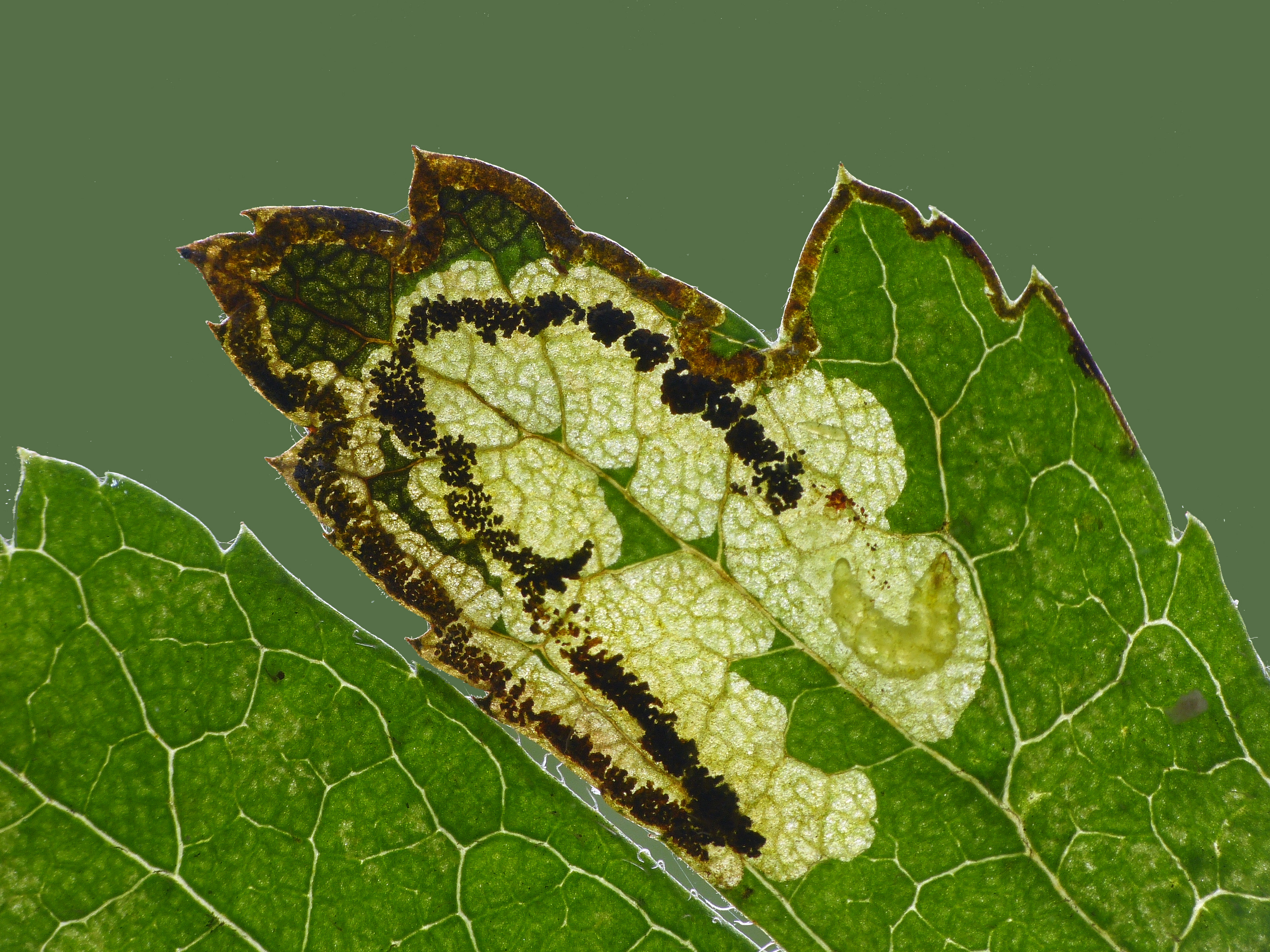
Mine of Stigmella regiella.

The larvae feed on Midland hawthorn (Crataegus laevigata), common hawthorn (Crataegus monogyna) and medlar (Mespilus germanica). They mine the leaves of their host plant.
