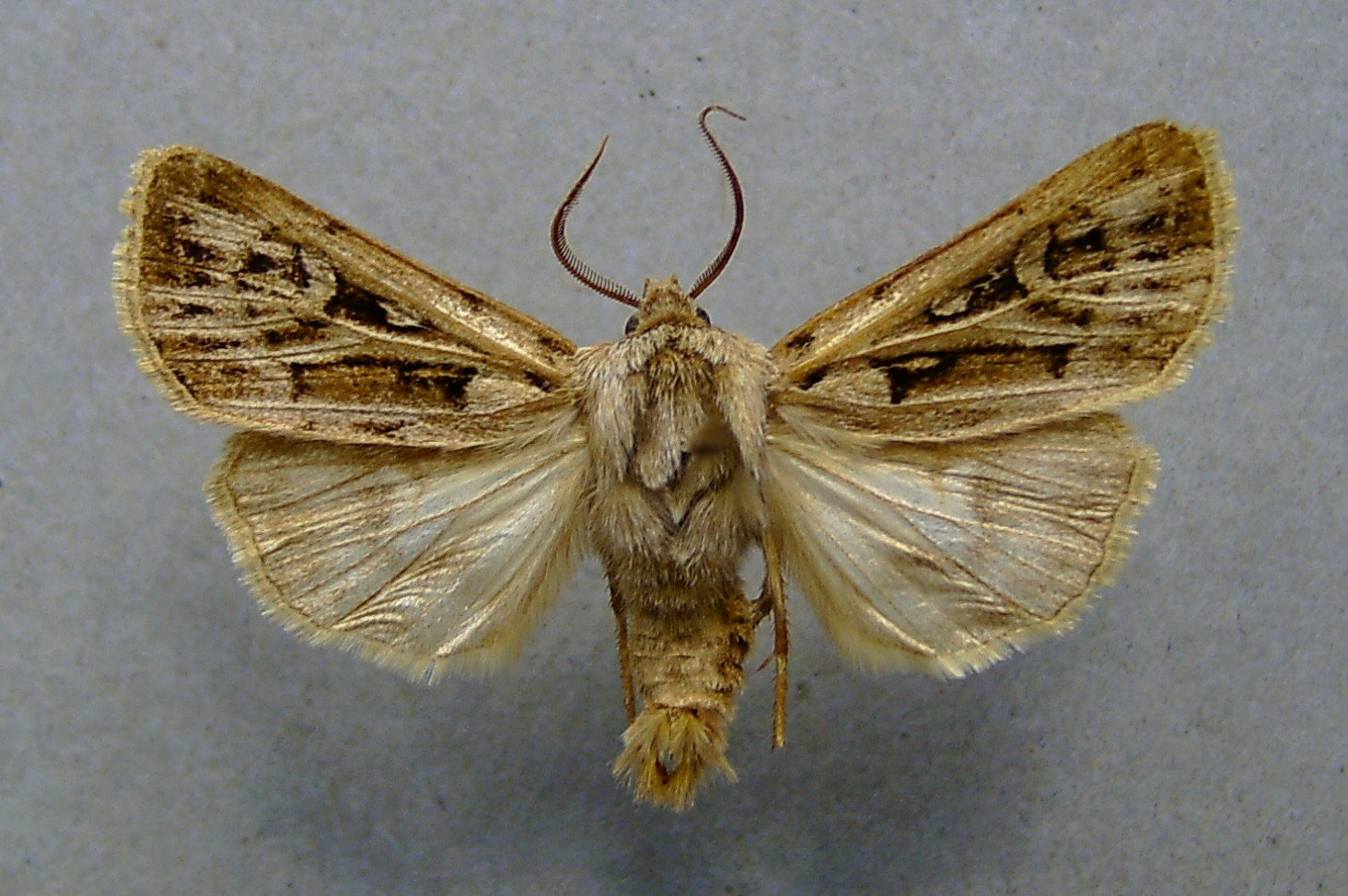

Scientific classification
- Kingdom: Animalia
- Phylum: Arthropoda
- Clade: Pancrustacea
- Class: Insecta
- Order: Lepidoptera
- Superfamily: Noctuoidea
- Family: Noctuidae
- Genus: Agrotis
- Species: A. fatidica

Binomial name
- Agrotis fatidica (Hübner, 1824)

Synonyms
- Noctua fatidica; Agrotis heydenreichii; Agrotis incurva; Agrotis monedula; Agrotis sajana; Euxoa fatidica; Euxoa trifurcula

= Agrotis fatidica =

Species of moth

Agrotis fatidica is a moth of the family Noctuidae. It is found in Southern and Central Europe, east through Russia to Mongolia, China and Tibet.

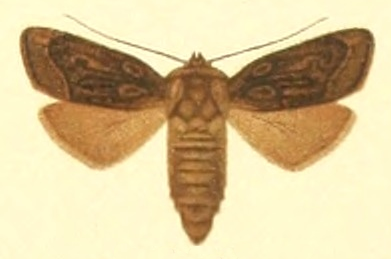
Illustrated Female

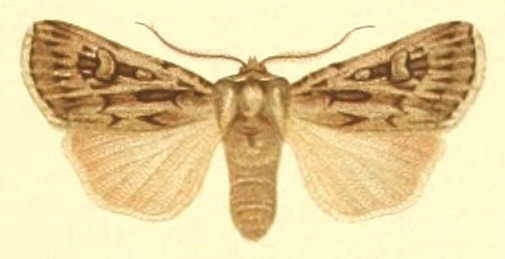
Illustrated Male

The wingspan is about 40 mm. Adults are on wing from July to August depending on the location.

The larvae feed on Poaceae species.

== Subspecies ==
- Agrotis fatidica fatidica (Europe, Russian plains, mountains of north-eastern Siberia, South Siberian Mountains, Central Yakutian Lowland, Kazakhstan and Mongolia)
- Agrotis fatidica trifurcula (South Siberian Mountains and Central Yakutian Lowland)
- Agrotis fatidica bombycina (Siberia, Mongolia, China)
