= Stigmella viscerella =

Scientific classification
- Kingdom: Animalia
- Phylum: Arthropoda
- Clade: Pancrustacea
- Class: Insecta
- Order: Lepidoptera
- Family: Nepticulidae
- Genus: Stigmella
- Species: S. viscerella

Binomial name
- Stigmella viscerella (Stainton, 1853)

Synonyms
- Nepticula viscerella Stainton, 1853; Nepticula subvirescens Meyrick, 1934; Nepticula tauromeniella Groschke, 1944

Species of moth

Stigmella viscerella is a moth of the family Nepticulidae. It is found in central and southern Europe, including Great Britain, but not on the Iberian Peninsula.

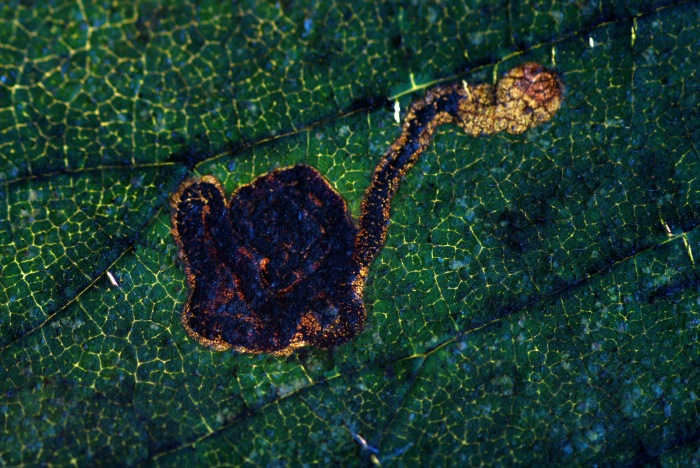
Damage

The wingspan is 5–6 mm. Adults are on wing from May to June in one generation.

The larvae feed on Ulmus minor. They mine the leaves of their host plant.
