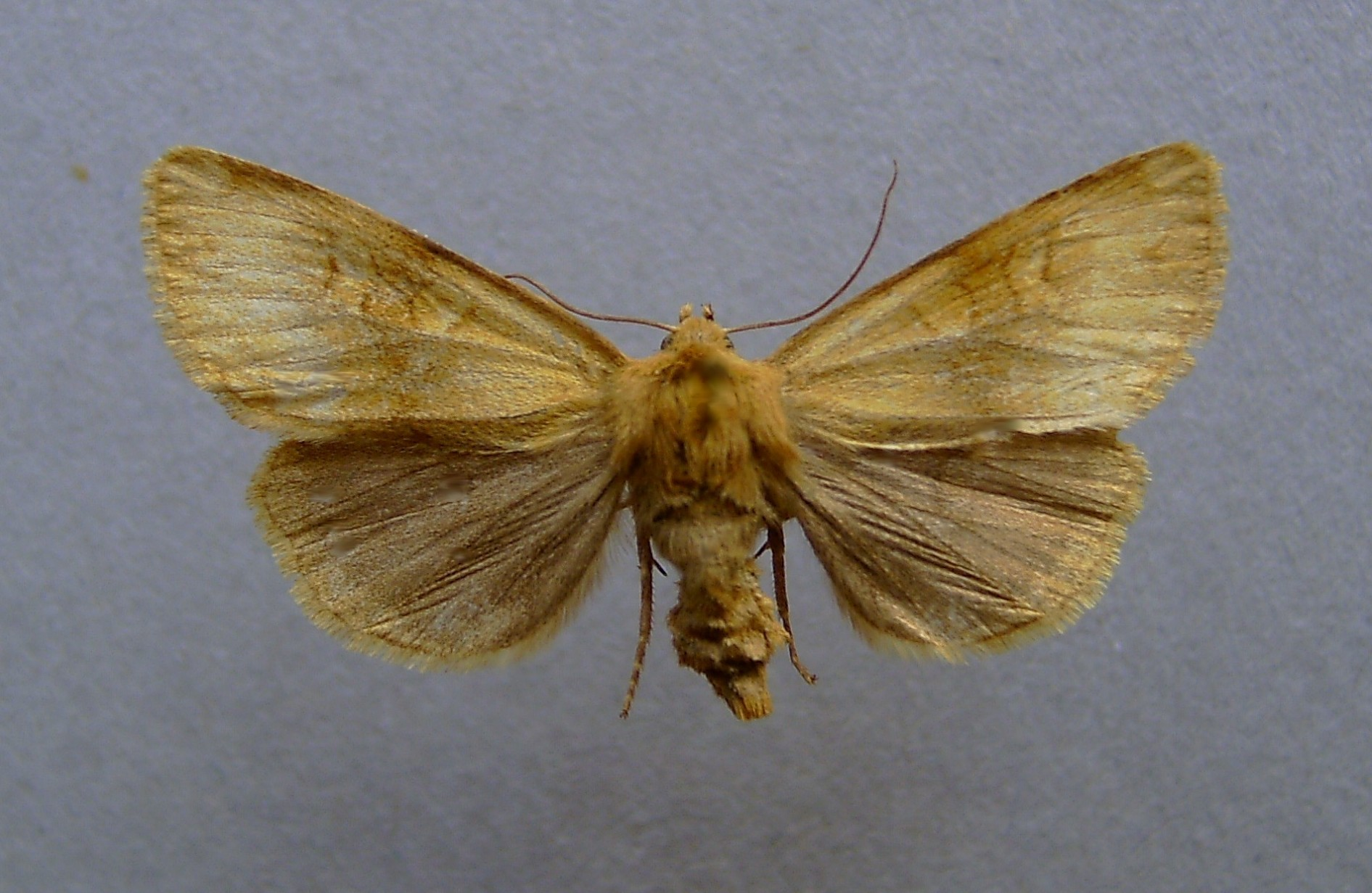

Scientific classification
- Kingdom: Animalia
- Phylum: Arthropoda
- Class: Insecta
- Order: Lepidoptera
- Superfamily: Noctuoidea
- Family: Noctuidae
- Genus: Xestia
- Species: X. lorezi

Binomial name
- Xestia lorezi (Staudinger, 1891)

Synonyms
- Epipsilia loresi Hampson, 1903; Agrotis sajana Tschetverikov, 1904; Anomogyna amathusia Corti & Draudt, 1933; Anomogyna amatoria Corti & Draudt, 1935

= Xestia lorezi =

Species of moth

Xestia lorezi is a moth of the family Noctuidae. It is found in northern Europe and the Alps. Subspecies lorezi is found in the Alps on altitudes between 1,700 and 2,500 meters. Subspecies kongsvoldensis is found in Fennoscandia and northern Russia. Outside of Europe, there are four more subspecies, ssp. sajana in the Sayan Mountains, ssp. katuna in the Altai Mountains, ssp. monotona in Yakutia and ssp. ogilviana in Yukon and Alaska.

The wingspan of ssp. lorezi is 38–41 mm. Subspecies kongsvoldensis has a wingspan of 33–37 mm. Adults are on wing from the end of June to August in one generation.

The larvae feed on various low-growing plants.

== Subspecies ==
- Xestia lorezi lorezi (Staudinger 1891) (northern Europe, Alps)
- Xestia lorezi kongsvoldensis (Gronlien 1922) (Fennoscandia, northern Russia)
- Xestia lorezi sajana (Sayan Mountains)
- Xestia lorezi katuna (Altai)
- Xestia lorezi monotona (Yakutia)
- Xestia lorezi ogilviana Lafontaine 1987 (North America)
