= Stigmella hahniella =

Scientific classification
- Kingdom: Animalia
- Phylum: Arthropoda
- Class: Insecta
- Order: Lepidoptera
- Family: Nepticulidae
- Genus: Stigmella
- Species: S. hahniella

Binomial name
- Stigmella hahniella (Wortz, 1890)

Synonyms
- Nepticula hahniella Wortz, 1890

Species of moth

Stigmella hahniella is a moth of the family Nepticulidae. It is found in Germany, Austria, the Czech Republic, Slovakia, Croatia, Hungary and Italy.

The larvae feed on Sorbus torminalis. They mine the leaves of their host plant.
