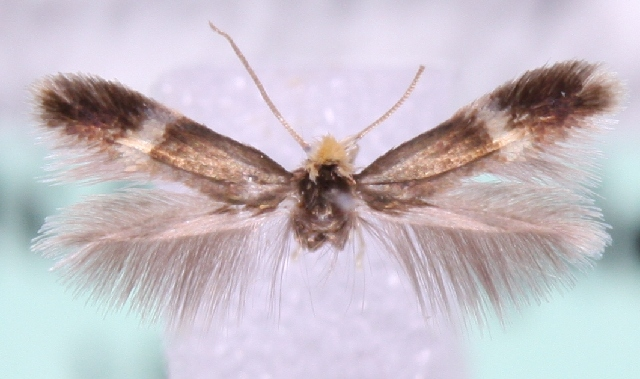

Scientific classification
- Kingdom: Animalia
- Phylum: Arthropoda
- Class: Insecta
- Order: Lepidoptera
- Family: Nepticulidae
- Genus: Stigmella
- Species: S. tityrella

Binomial name
- Stigmella tityrella (Stainton, 1854)

Synonyms
- Nepticula tityrella Stainton, 1854; Nepticula castanella Stainton, 1859; Nepticula turicella Herrich-Schaffer, 1855; Nepticula turicensis Frey, 1856

= Stigmella tityrella =

Species of moth

Stigmella tityrella is a species of moth in the family Nepticulidae. It is found in all of Europe west of Russia.

The wingspan is 5–6 mm. The thick erect hairs on the head vertex are ochreous-yellowish. The collar is white. Antennal eyecaps are white. The forewings are shining bronzy-brown with a rather oblique shining golden-silvery fascia beyond middle; apical area beyond this dark bronzy-brown. Hindwings are grey; in male with an expansible pencil of blackish hairs at base of costa. External image

Adults are on wing from April to May and again from July to August. There are two generations per year.

The larvae feed on beech (Fagus sylvatica), mining the leaves of their host plant. The mine consists of a corridor that does not widen much and zigzags between two lateral veins in the direction of the leaf margin.

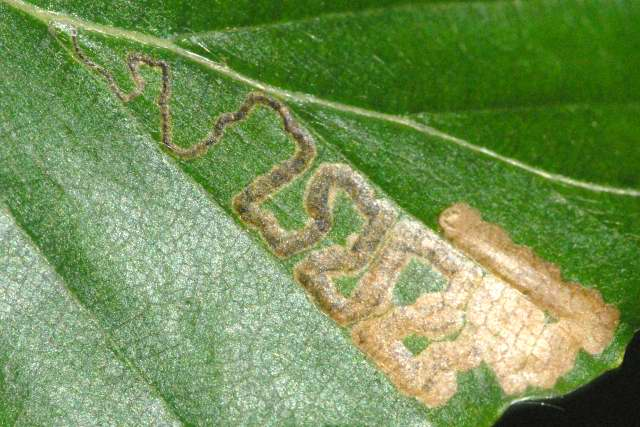
Leaf mine damage caused by larva
