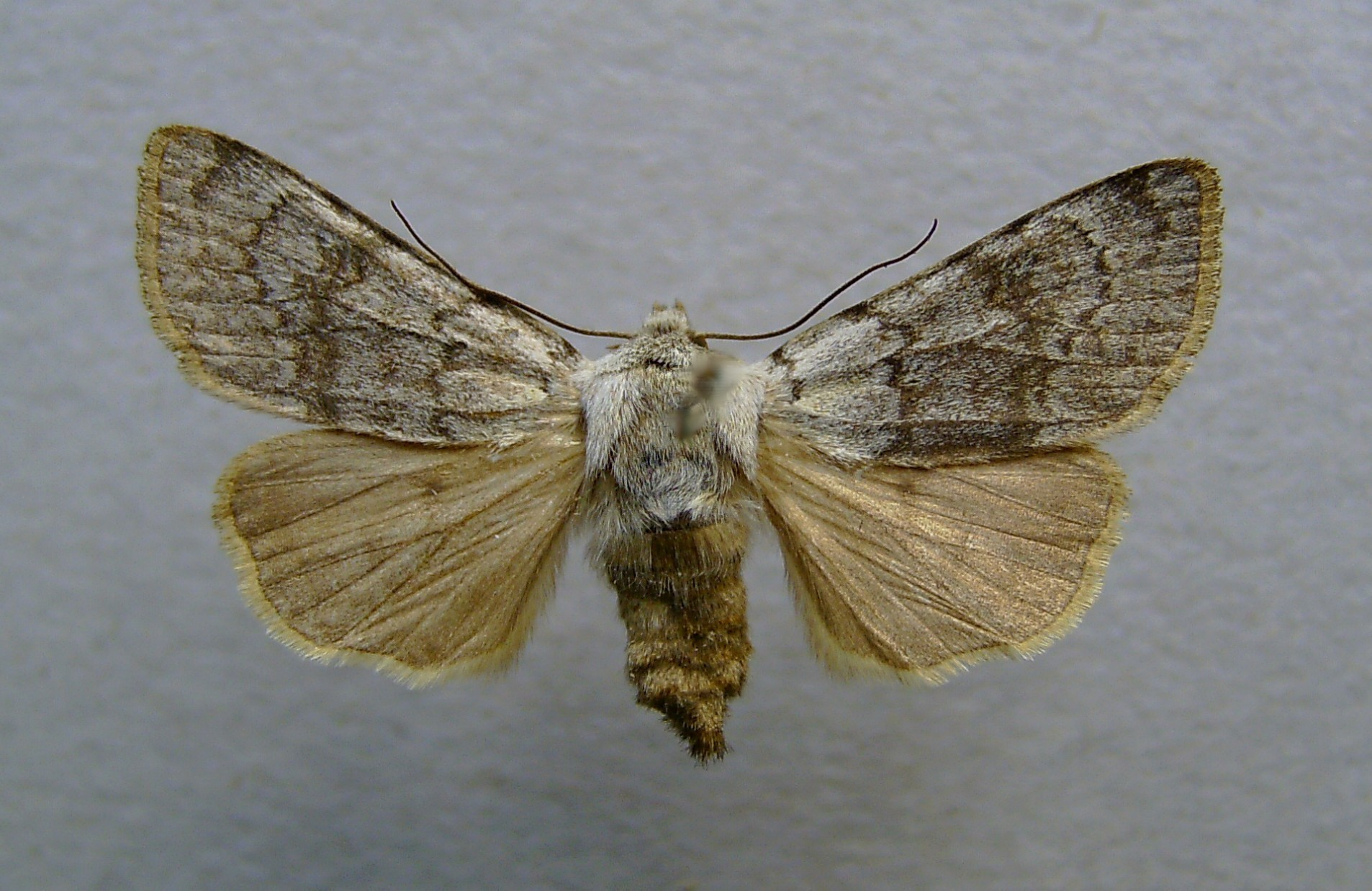

Scientific classification
- Kingdom: Animalia
- Phylum: Arthropoda
- Clade: Pancrustacea
- Class: Insecta
- Order: Lepidoptera
- Superfamily: Noctuoidea
- Family: Noctuidae
- Genus: Agrotis
- Species: A. simplonia

Binomial name
- Agrotis simplonia (Geyer, 1832)

Synonyms
- Noctua simplonia; Scotia simplonia; Euxoa simplonia; Agrotis nigrescens; Agrotis suffusa; Agrotis obsolescens; Agrotis coralita

= Agrotis simplonia =

Species of moth

Agrotis simplonia is a moth of the family Noctuidae. It is found in the Alps, Pyrenees, the Cantabrian Mountains and the Apennine Mountains on heights between 1,200 and 3,000 meters.

The wingspan is 32–40 mm. Adults are on wing from May to October.

The larvae feed on various grasses.

== Taxonomy ==
The Spanish population was described as a separate species Agrotis coralita by Hospital in 1948. This is now considered a synonym.
