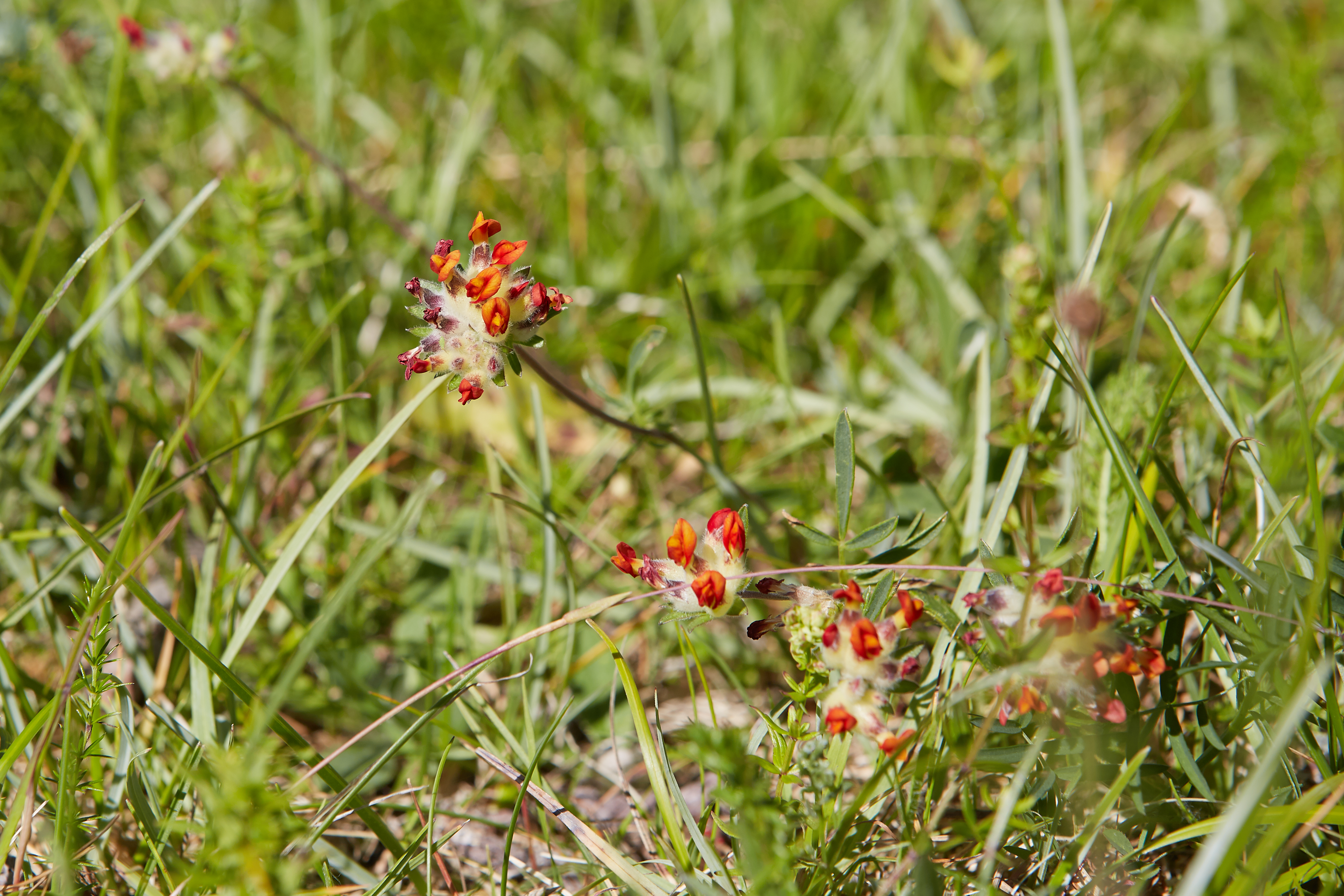

Scientific classification
- Kingdom: Plantae
- Clade: Tracheophytes
- Clade: Angiosperms
- Clade: Eudicots
- Clade: Rosids
- Order: Fabales
- Family: Fabaceae
- Subfamily: Faboideae
- Genus: Anthyllis
- Species: A. coccinea

Binomial name
- Anthyllis coccinea (L.) Beck

= Anthyllis coccinea =

Species of legume

Anthyllis coccinea is a species of flowering plant native to Europe. This plant is sometimes considered as Anthyllis vulneraria var. coccinea.

== Other sources ==
- Anthyllis vulneraria var. coccinea (accessed 5 March 2020)
