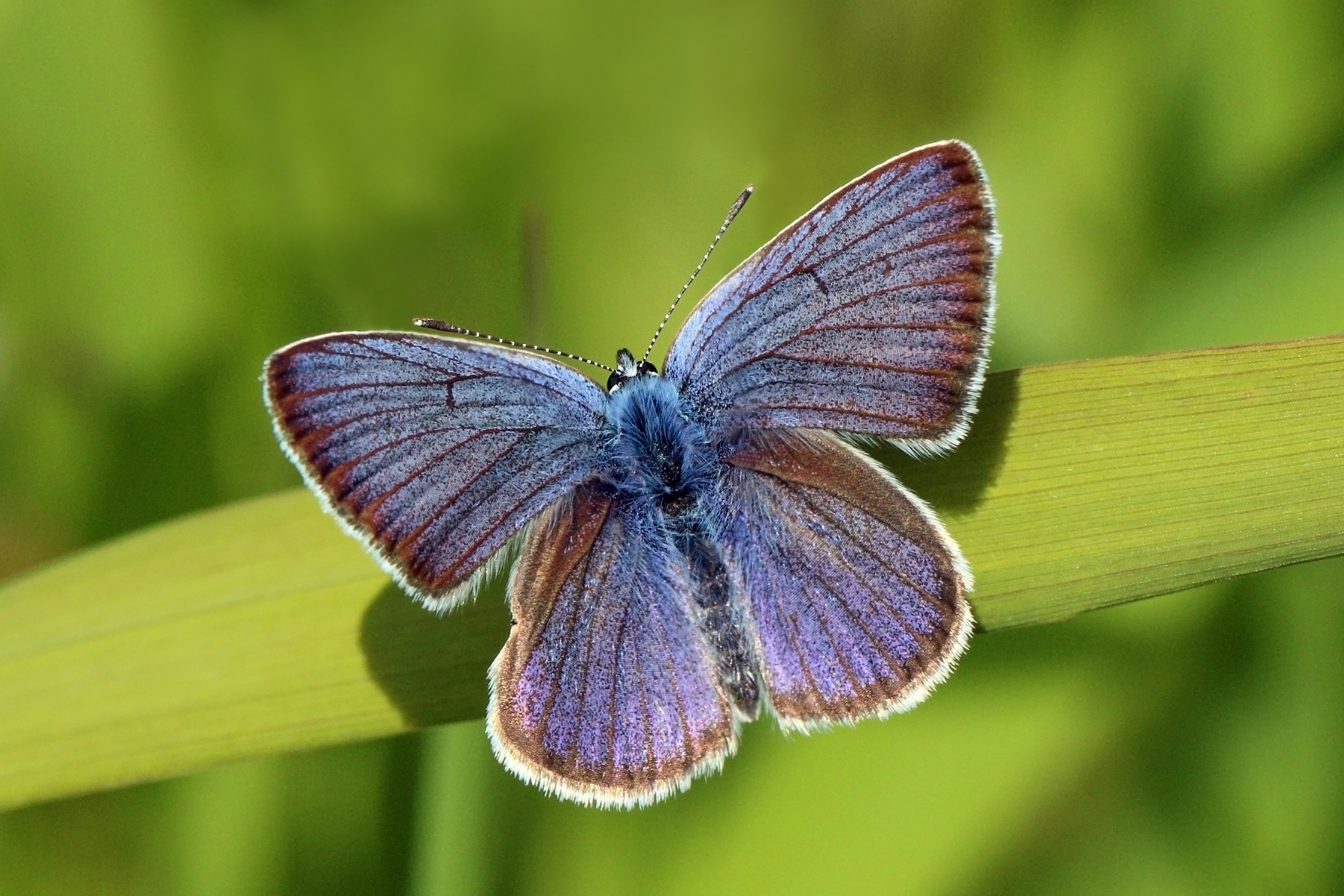
- Male, Estonia
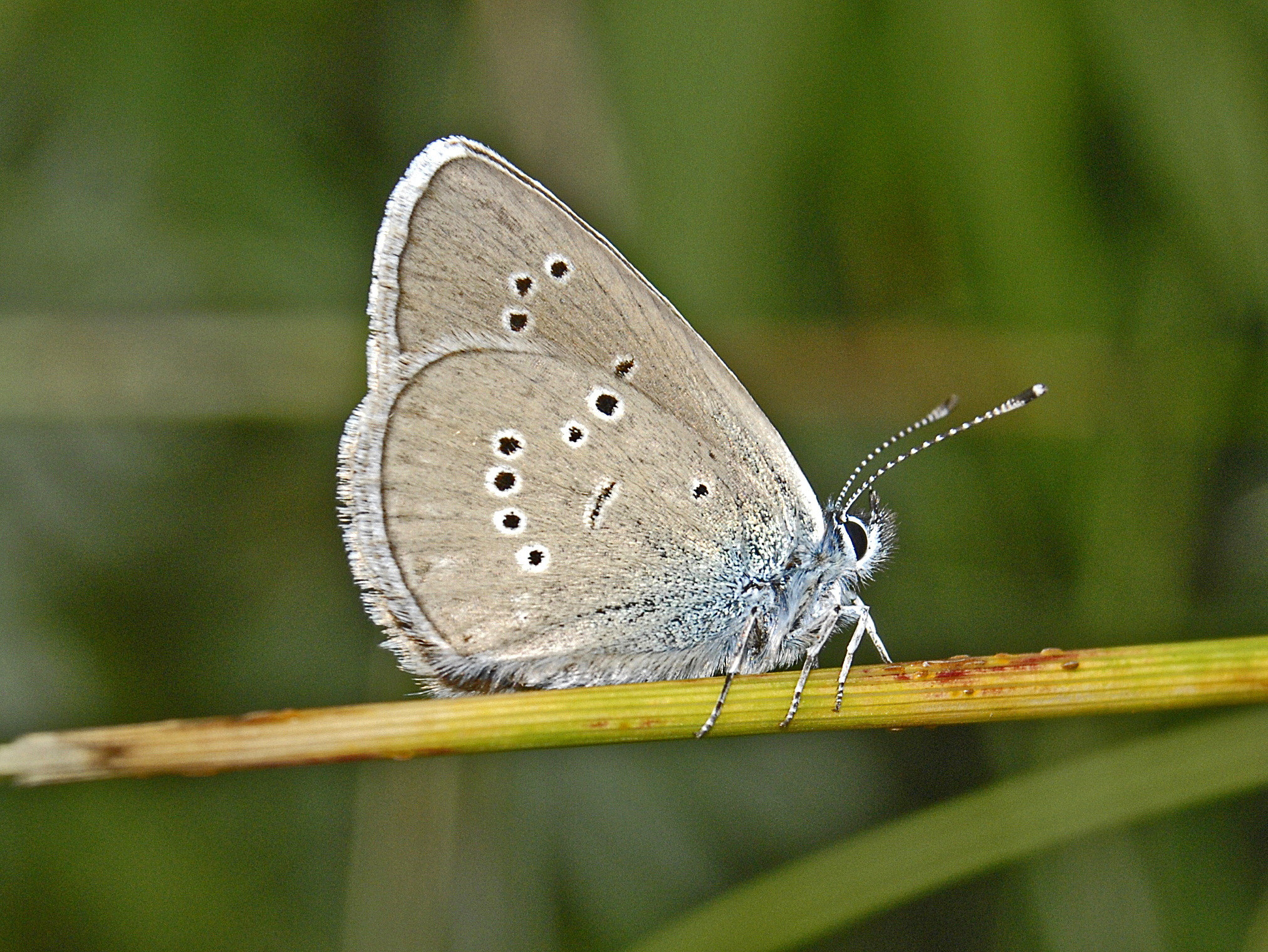
- Italy

Scientific classification
- Kingdom: Animalia
- Phylum: Arthropoda
- Class: Insecta
- Order: Lepidoptera
- Family: Lycaenidae
- Genus: Cyaniris
- Species: C. semiargus

Binomial name
- Cyaniris semiargus (Rottemburg, 1775)

Synonyms
- Papilio semiargus Rottemburg, 1775; Lycaena semiargus (Rottemburg, 1775); Polyommatus semiargus (Rottemburg, 1775); Papilio acis Denis & Schiffermüller, 1775 (preocc. Drury, 1773); Cyaniris argianus Dalman, 1816

= Cyaniris semiargus =

Mazarine blue

Species of butterfly

Cyaniris semiargus, the Mazarine blue, is a Palearctic butterfly in the family Lycaenidae.

== Subspecies ==
Subspecies include:

- Cyaniris semiargus semiargus (Europe, Caucasus, Siberia, Russian Far East)
- Cyaniris semiargus altaiana (Tutt, 1909) (Tian-Shan, Altai Mountains, Sayan Mountains, Transbaikalia)
- Cyaniris semiargus amurensis (Tutt, 1909) (Amur river, Ussuri, Japan)
- Cyaniris semiargus atra (Grum-Grshimailo, 1885) (Ghissar, Alai Mountains, Darvaz)
- Cyaniris semiargus jiadengyunus (Huang & Murayama, 1992) (Altai Mountains)
- Cyaniris semiargus maroccana (Lucas, 1920 (Morocco)
- Cyaniris semiargus tartessus (Gil-T. & Huertas, 2007) (SW. Spain)
- Cyaniris semiargus transiens Melcon, 1910 (Spain)
- Cyaniris semiargus uralensis (Tutt, 1909) (Urals)

== Distribution ==
The Mazarine blue's population is distributed throughout continental Europe, reaching into the Arctic Circle, Morocco, and the Middle East then east across the Palearctic to Siberia and the Russian Far East. There was a large native population in Britain in the early part of the 19th century, but it disappeared before the 20th century, though single vagrants have been spotted, and some estimates of British resident extinction are as late as 1906. In 2009, UNESCO was researching a possible reintroduction of the Mazarine blue to Britain. Recently, the Mazarine blue's numbers have been declining in its European range (particularly Scandinavia) and the reason remains unclear.

== Habitat ==
This common species inhabits meadows, pastures, grasslands and flowery grassy damp areas up to 2200m. It seems to prefer places which are not fertilized and not used for fodder production.

== Description ==
The wingspan of the male and female are similar, at 32–38 mm.

These butterflies present a sexual dimorphism. The male Mazarine blue's wings are a deep blue with a heavy venation and are slightly larger in diameter than the female's. The upperside of the wings shows black borders and white fringes. The female Mazarine blue is brown. The underside of the wings is greyish or ocher, with a series of black spots surrounded by white and a blue scaling in the basal area.

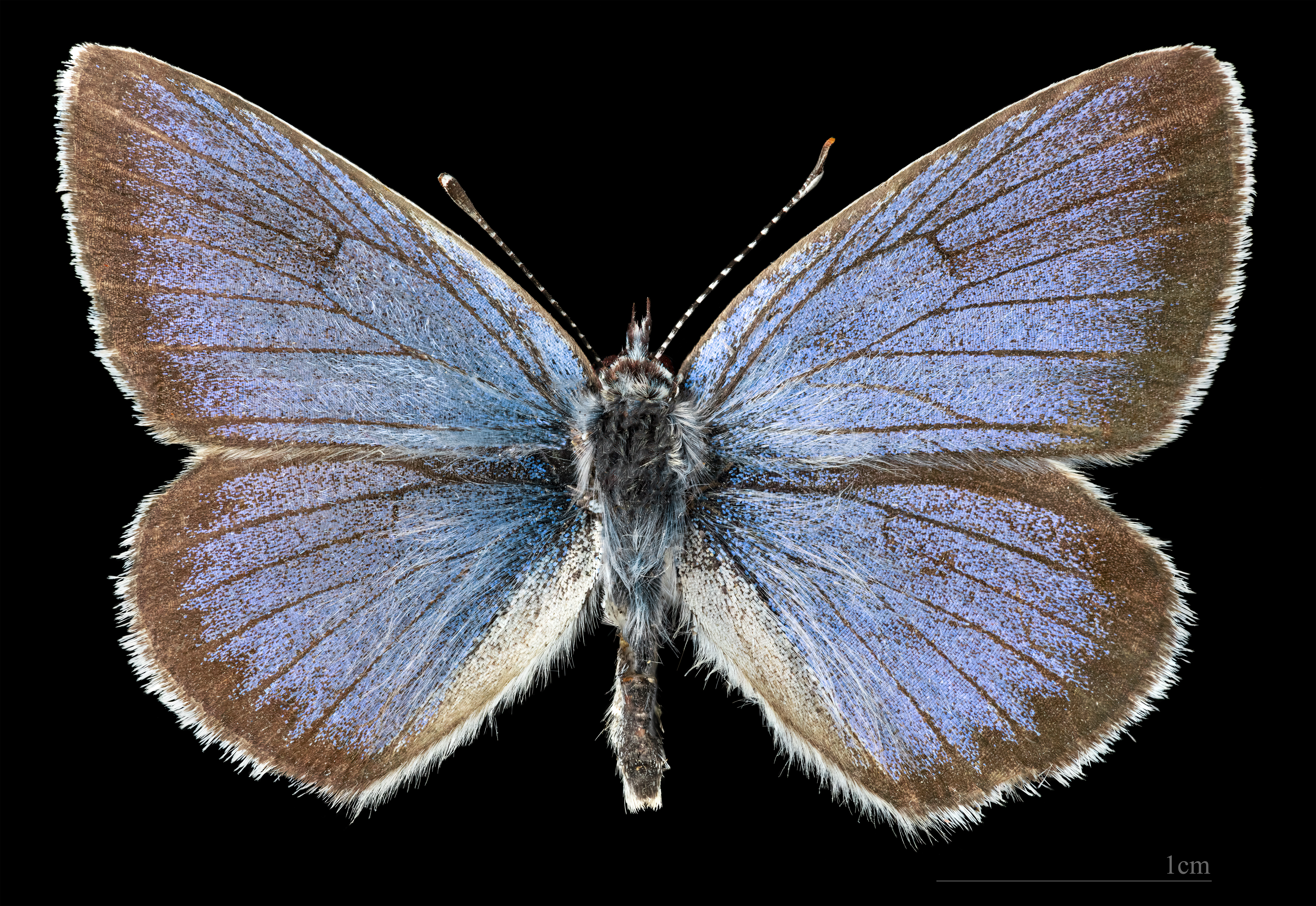
Cyaniris semiargus ♂

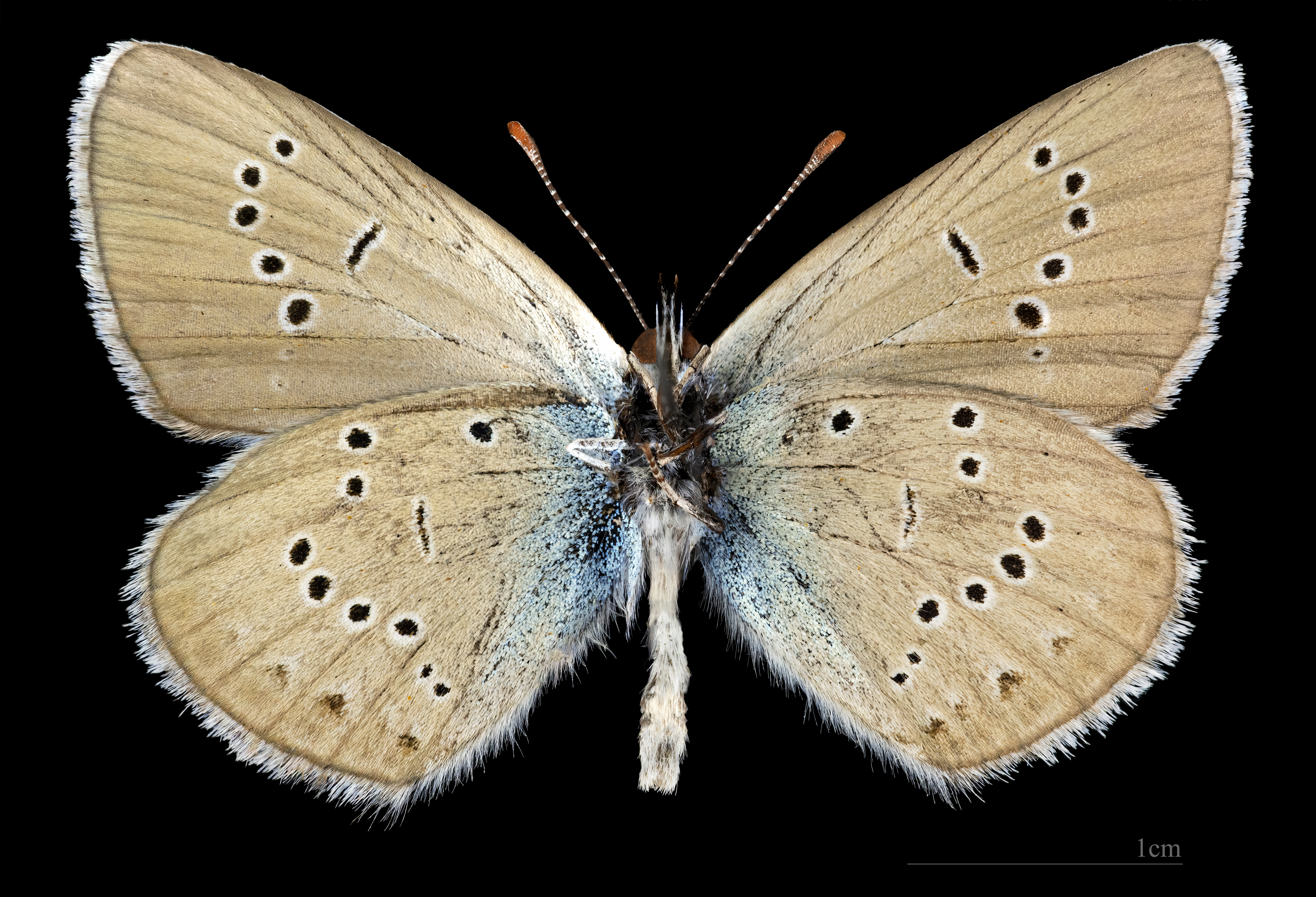
Cyaniris semiargus ♂ △

Both sexes lack orange markings and have a dark violet or brown body colour. The butterfly has been compared to the common blue, and the Grecian Cyaniris bellis (Freyer, 1845) which has orange markings.

This species is rather similar to Cupido minimus, but in the underside hindwings of the Mazarine blue the black spot in space 6 and the two spots next to it form an obtuse angle, while in C. minimus they create an acute angle.

The larva is yellow green with darker lines and has fine hairs and dark brown spiracles. The pupa is olive green and attached to the food plant with a silk girdle.

== Description in Seitz ==
L. semiargus Rott. (= acis .Schiff., argiolus Fuessl, argianus Zett.) (82 e). male above dull but deep blue, without gloss, with black margin and thin dark discocellular spot; the fringes pure white. Female above black-brown, the fringes darkened. Underside earth-grey with blue scaling at the base, distinct discocellular spot and a row of discal ocelli as well as a basal ocellus below the costa of the hindwing. Of the modifications in the ocelli of the hindwing we mention first ab. spadae Hellweger, in which the ocelli are all absent. In ab. caeca Fuchs there is only one ocellus on the forewing. In ab. striata Wheel. the ocelli are modified into streaks. The ocelli are enlarged and placed nearer to the outer margin in aetnaea Zett., which was (accidentally) found on the Etna. Throughout Europe and North Asia, eastwards to the Pacific; also in England, but here rare and apparently disappearing; in Europe and Asia as far north as 68 deg(Herz). — montana M.-Dur [C semiargus ssp. montana Meyer-Dür, 1852] (82 e) is an alpine form which occurs in the higher Alps and the mountains of South-East Europe; smaller, the male bright blue above, with broader black distal border. — bellis Frr. [Cyaniris bellis (Freyer, 1845)] (82 e, f) is above like montana, but the hindwing beneath bears traces of yellowish red spots in anal area. — impura Krul has dull yellow spots before the whole outer margin, especially on thehindwing; from East Russia. — parnassia Stgr.[Cyaniris bellis] from the Balkan Peninsula, resembles impura, but is larger. — In helena Stgr. [Cyaniris bellis]. (82 f), a small form from the mountains of Southern Greece, the reddish yellow spots of the underside form a continuous chain and some of them appear in the female also on the upperside, which is quite generally the case in the still more southern form antiochenaLed.[C. b. antiochena (Lederer, 1861)] — Larva dull greenish yellow with brown head, a dark dorsal line and a dark lateral one; in July and in the autumn on Anthyllis and Armeria vulgaris, in the inflorescences. Pupa light olive-green, the hibernating pupae become brown later on; fastened with anal end at the stem of the food-plant (Assmus). The butterflies in May and again in August, in most districts singly but common, flying on broad forest roads and grassy borders of fields. Their flight is rather clumsy and very low, the insects usually keeping quite close to the ground and frequently visiting Potentilla, Ranunculus and Trefoil. In the high mountains the species is one of the commonest on damp places on roads.

== Biology ==
This species has one brood each year. It overwinters as a young larva. Adults fly from May to August. Caterpillars mainly feed on Red Clover (Trifolium pratense) and other species of Trifolium (Trifolium medium, Trifolium spadiceum), on Vicia cracca, Anthyllis, Genista and Melilotus.

== Etymology ==
Mazarine is a shade of deep rich blue on late 17th- and early 18th-century export porcelain, itself derived from Cardinal Mazarin.

== Gallery ==
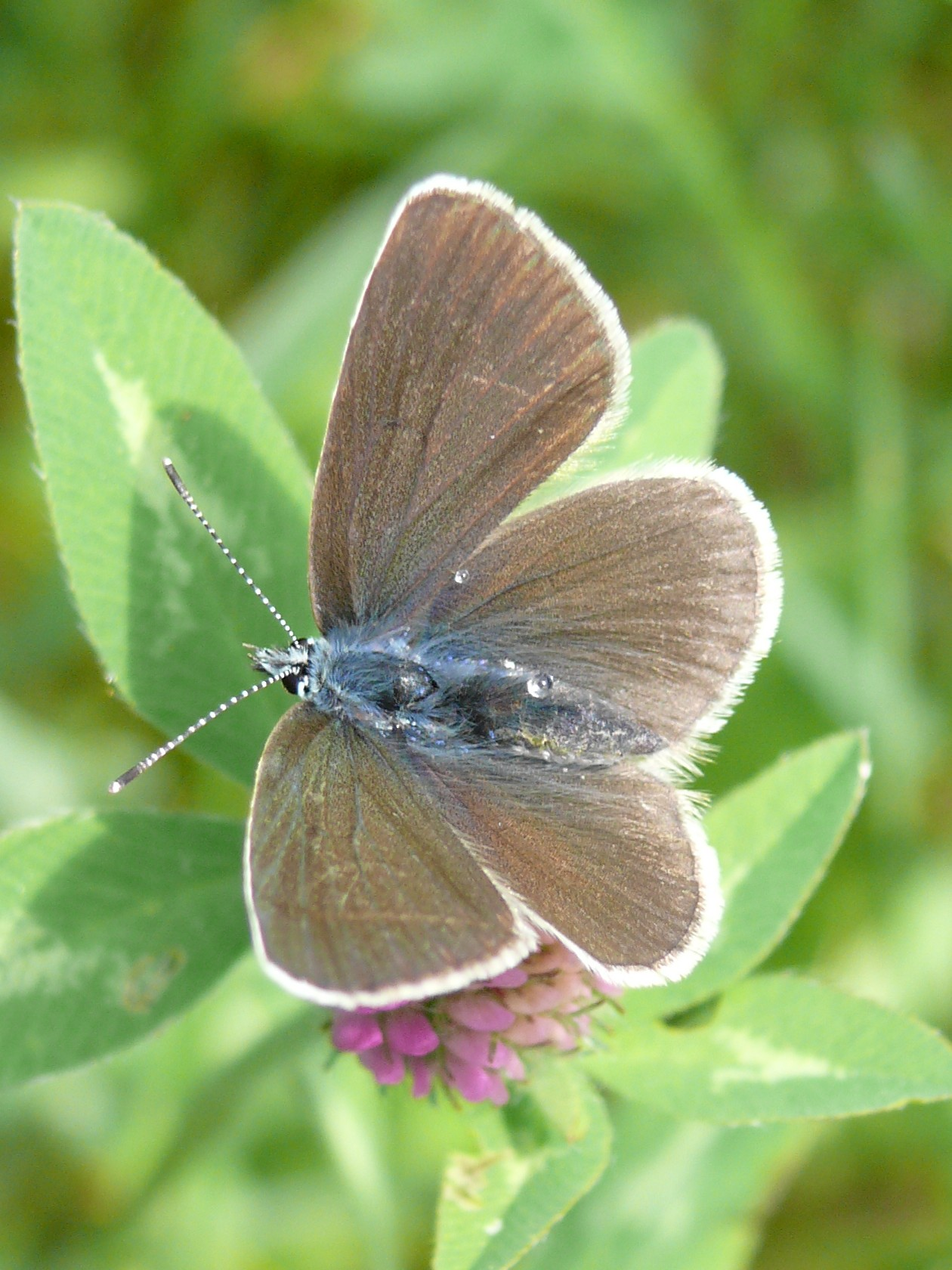
Female

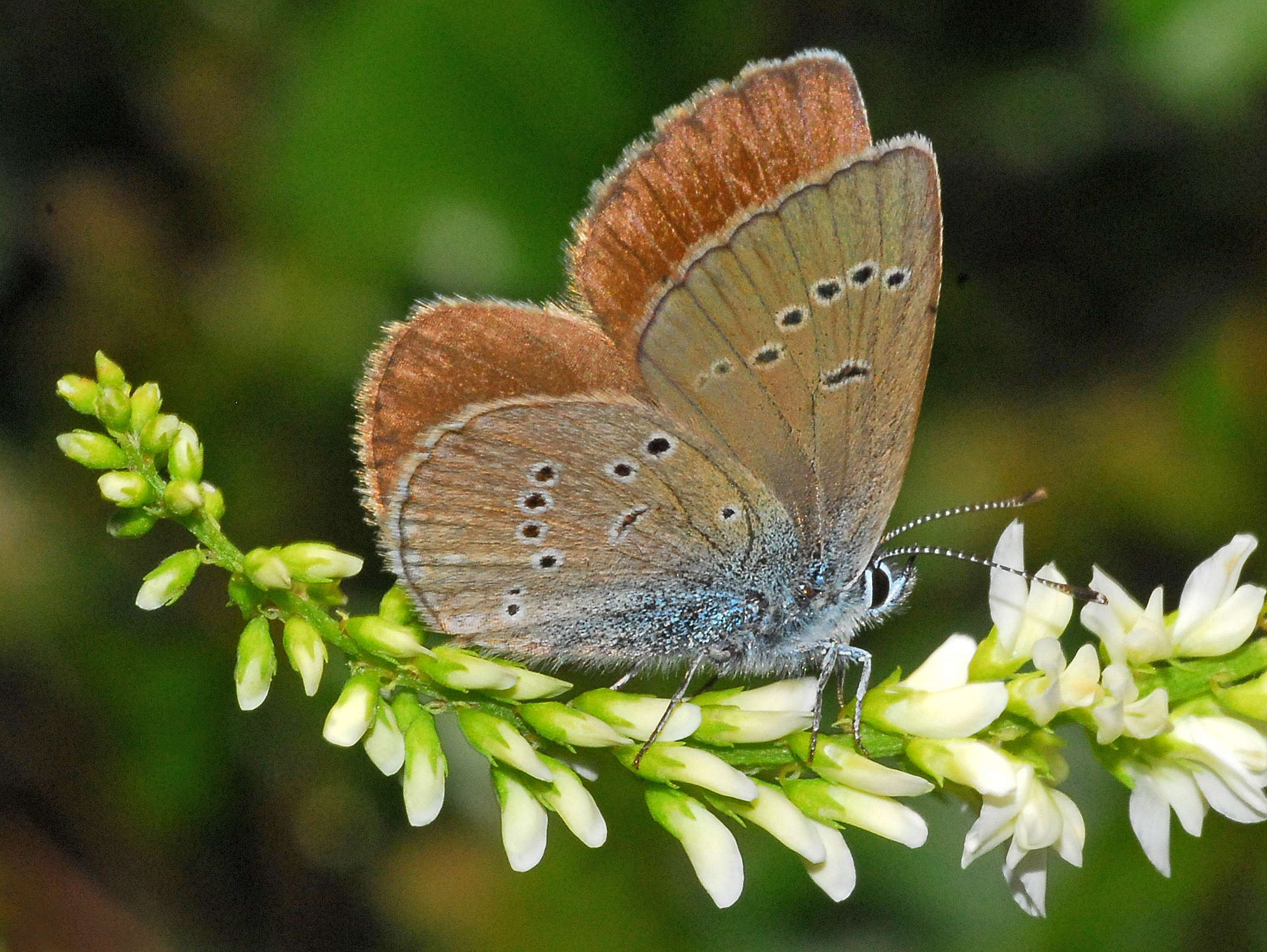
Female

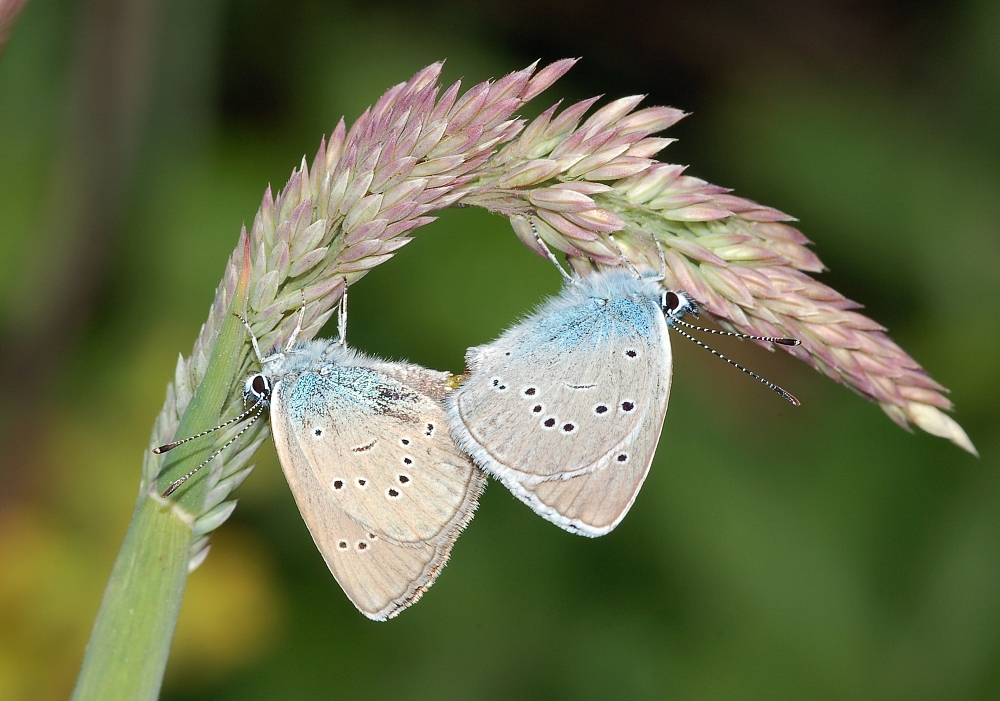
Mating pair

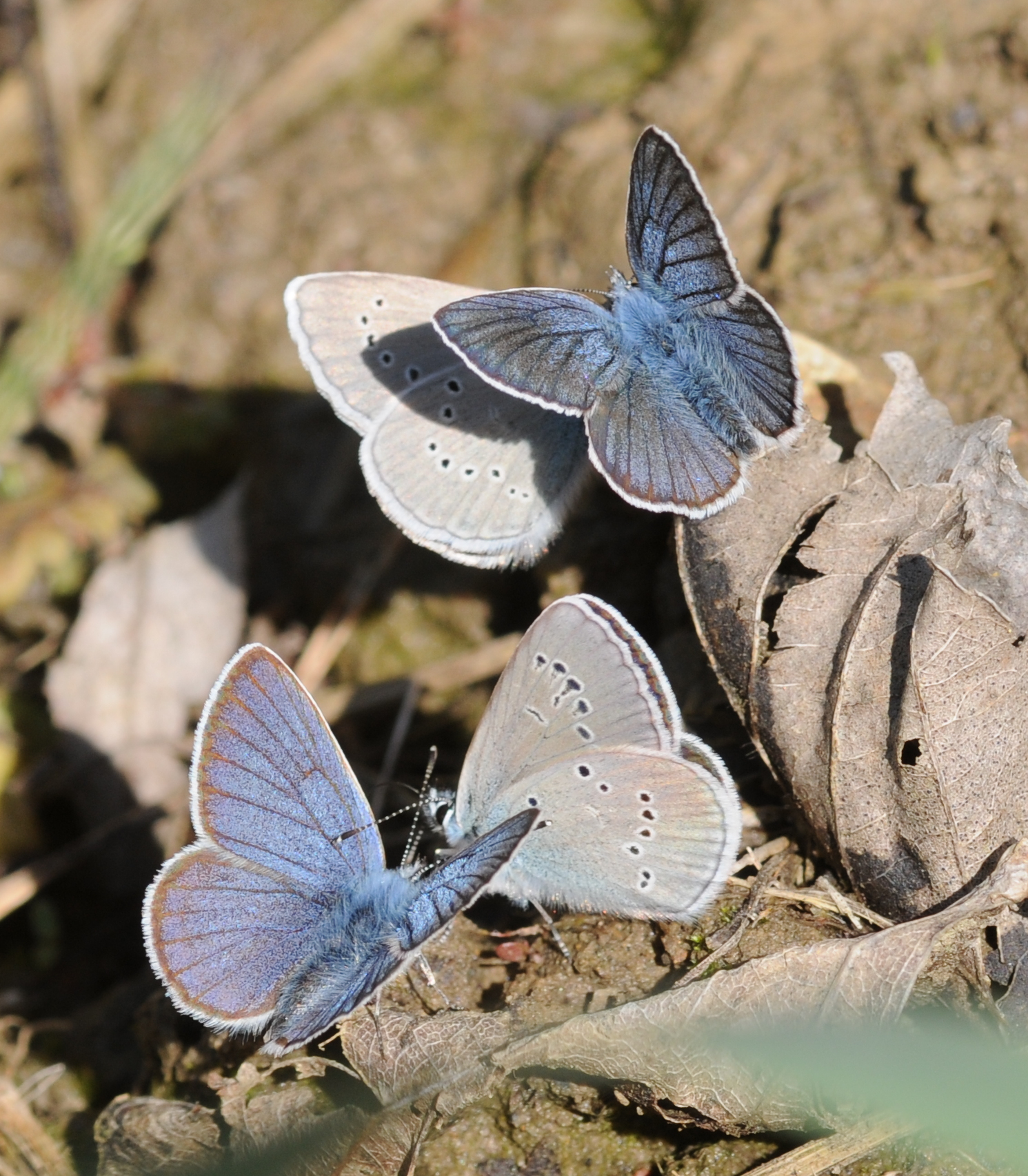
A group

== Bibliography ==
- D.J. Carter (ill. B. Hargreaves), Guide des chenilles d'Europe, Delachaux et Niestlé, coll. «Les guides du naturaliste », 2001, 311 p. (ISBN 2-603-00639-8)
- Gil-T., F. & M. Huertas (2007): Description of Cyaniris semiargus tartessus subspec. nov. from the National Park of Doñana (SW. Spain) (Lepidoptera, Lycaenidae). ISSN 0171-0079 | Atalanta, 38(1/2): 185–188. Full article: .
- Haworth (1803) Haworth, A.H. (1803) Lepidoptera Britannica.
- Leach (1815) Leach (1815) In Brewster: The Edinburgh Encyclopædia.
- Lewin (1795) Lewin, W. (1795) The Papilios of Great Britain.
- Swainson (1827) Swainson, W. (1827) A Sketch of the Natural Affinities of the Lepidoptera Diurna of Latreille. The Philosophical magazine : or Annals of chemistry, mathematics, astronomy, natural history and general science.
- Tolman T., Lewington R. Collins Field Guide Butterflies of Britain & Europe — London : Harper Collins Publishers, 1997.— 320 p., 106 col. Pl
- Tom Tolman et Richard Lewington, Guide des papillons d'Europe et d'Afrique du Nord, Delachaux et Niestlé, 2010 (ISBN 978-2-603-01649-7)
