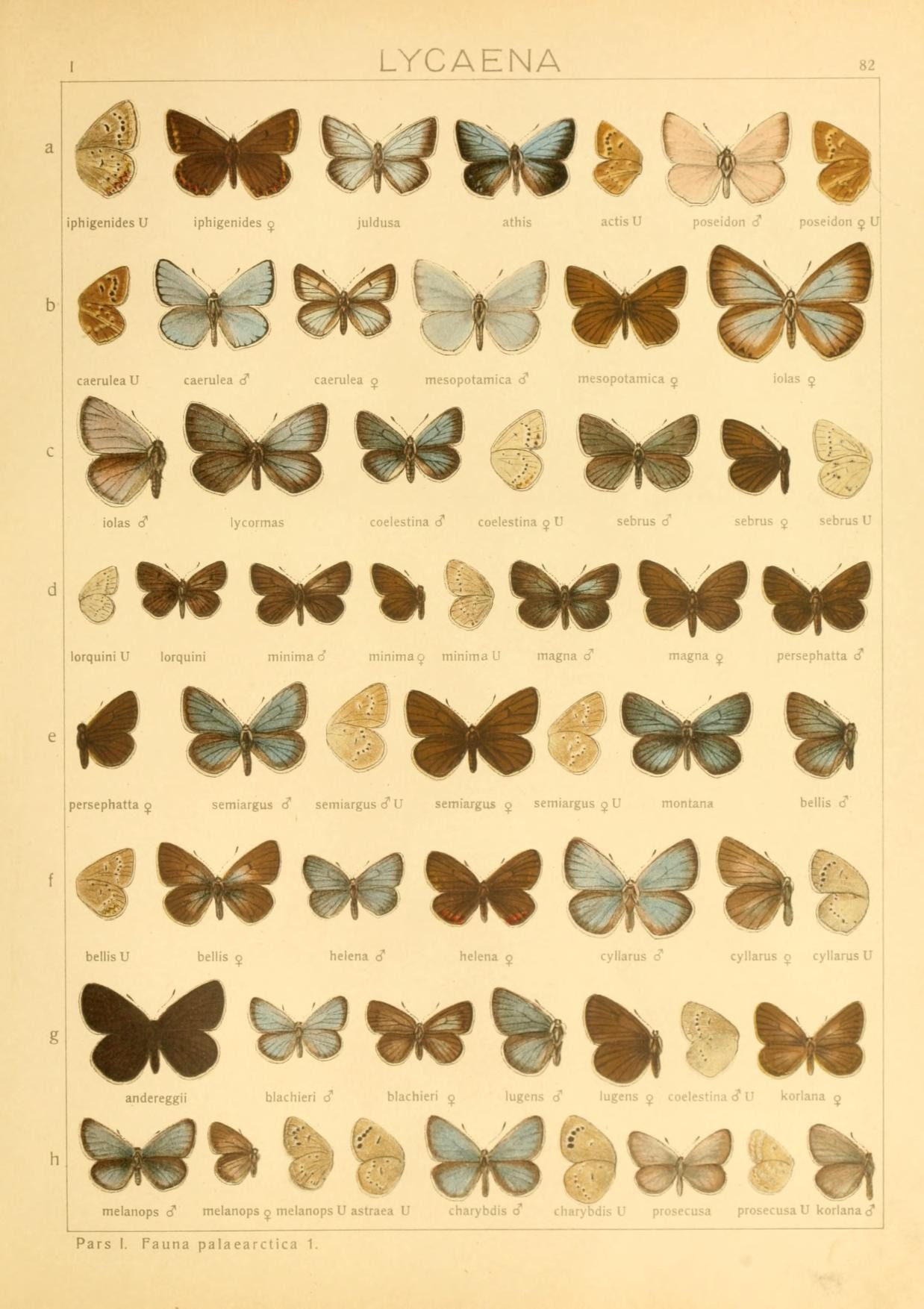
- Cyaniris bellis in Seitz 80 g

Scientific classification
- Kingdom: Animalia
- Phylum: Arthropoda
- Class: Insecta
- Order: Lepidoptera
- Family: Lycaenidae
- Genus: Cyaniris
- Species: C. bellis

Binomial name
- Cyaniris bellis (Freyer, [1842])

Synonyms
- Lycaena bellis Freyer, 1845; Polyommatus bellis (Freyer, 1845); Lycaena helena Staudinger, 1862; Lycaena semiargus v. parnassia Staudinger, 1870; Cyaniris semiargus var. balcanica Tutt, 1909

= Cyaniris bellis =

Greek mazarine blue

Species of butterfly

Cyaniris bellis, the Greek mazarine blue, is a butterfly found in the Palearctic (Asia Minor, South Europe, North Africa, Transcaucasia, Iran) that belongs to the blues family.

== Taxonomy ==
The subspecies C. b. antiochena (Lederer, 1861) is found in Caucasus Minor, Armenia (highlands) and the Talysh Mountains.

== Description from Seitz ==
bellis Frr. (82 e, f) is above like montana . [preceding text — Montana M.-Dur (82 e) is an alpine form [of semiargus] which occurs in the higher Alps and the mountains of South-East Europe; smaller, the male bright blue above, with broader black distal border] but the hindwing beneath bears traces of yellowish red spots in anal area. In helena Stgr. (82 f), a small form from the mountains of Southern Greece, the reddish yellow spots of the underside form a continuous chain and some of them appear in the female also on the upperside, which is quite generally the case in the still more southern form antiochena Led.

== Biology ==
The larva feeds on Anthyllis vulneraria, Trifolium pratense, Melilotus officinalis, Lotus corniculatus.

== See also ==
- List of butterflies of Russia
