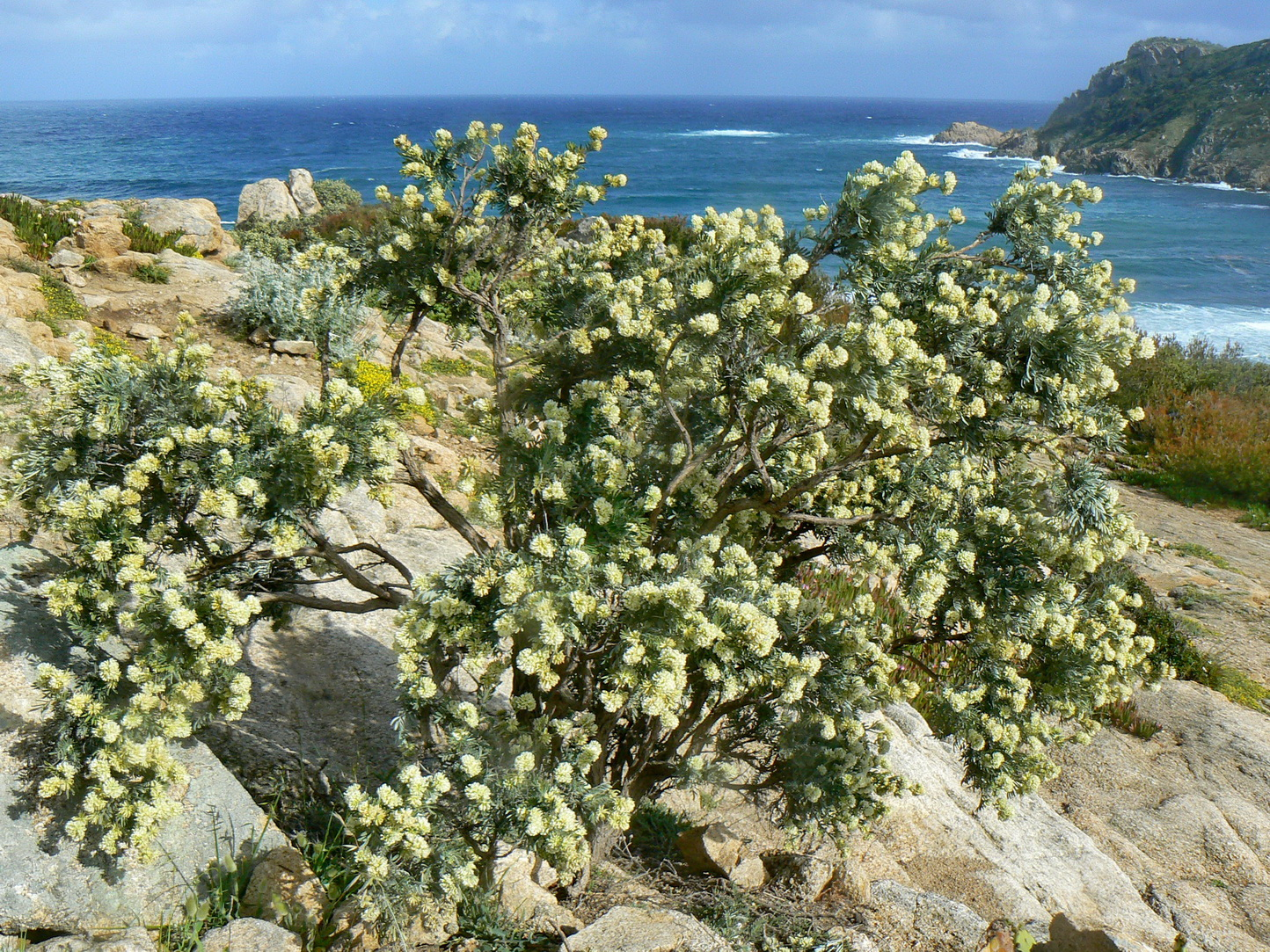
- Mature individual at Point de la Douane, Ramatuelle

Scientific classification
- Kingdom: Plantae
- Clade: Tracheophytes
- Clade: Angiosperms
- Clade: Eudicots
- Clade: Rosids
- Order: Fabales
- Family: Fabaceae
- Subfamily: Faboideae
- Genus: Anthyllis
- Species: A. barba-jovis

Binomial name
- Anthyllis barba-jovis L.

= Anthyllis barba-jovis =

Species of flowering plant

Anthyllis barba-jovis or Jupiter's beard is a species of flowering plant belonging to the family Fabaceae.

Its native range is in the European and Southwest Mediterranean.

== Description ==
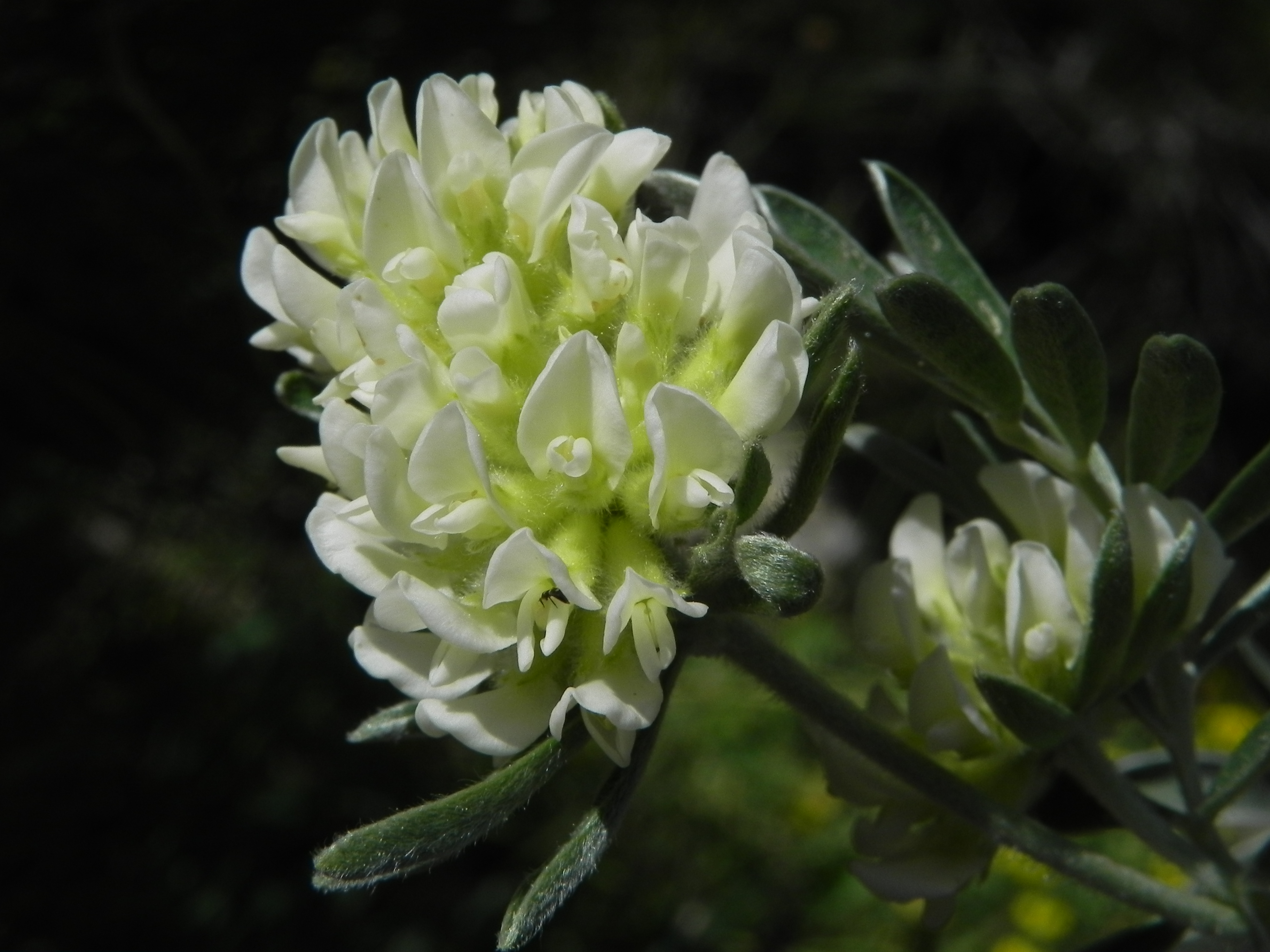
Inflorescence in Southern France

It is a shrub, reaching or exceeding 1.5 m (4 ft 11 in) in height. It is often highly branched.

- It is characterized by silver-gray odd-pinnate leaves, in 4–9 pairs.
- Its zygomorphous flowers are long, yellow-white, with 10 stamina and 5 bracts.
- Its fruit is a legume with multiple seeds.

== Distribution ==
It is found native in Greece the former Yugoslavia, Italy, France, Spain, Algeria, and Tunisia.

== Habitat ==
It grows in littoral areas among limestone outcroppings.
