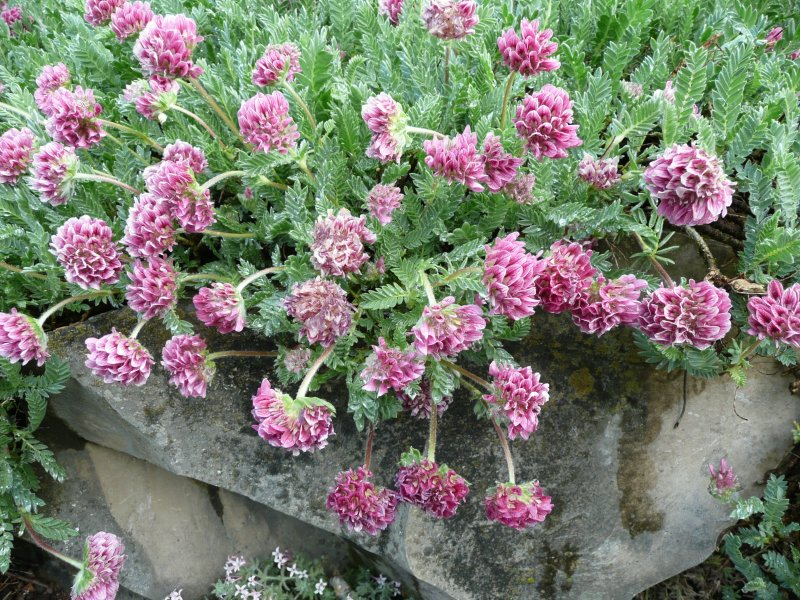

Scientific classification
- Kingdom: Plantae
- Clade: Tracheophytes
- Clade: Angiosperms
- Clade: Eudicots
- Clade: Rosids
- Order: Fabales
- Family: Fabaceae
- Subfamily: Faboideae
- Genus: Anthyllis
- Species: A. montana

Binomial name
- Anthyllis montana L.

= Anthyllis montana =

Species of legume

Anthyllis montana (syn. Vulneraria montana Scopoli), the mountain kidney vetch, is a species of flowering plant in the family Fabaceae, native to the mountains of Southern Europe and parts of the Alps. Growing to 30 cm (12 in) tall by 60 cm (24 in) broad, it is a clump-forming, woody-based perennial. The leaves are divided into numerous fern-like leaflets and are silky and grey-green in colour. The white, pink or purple clover-like flower-heads are borne in spring and summer. The Latin specific epithet montana refers to mountains or coming from mountains.

In cultivation, it is suitable for the alpine or rock garden. The cultivar 'Rubra' has gained the Royal Horticultural Society's Award of Garden Merit. It does best in full sun, and typically propagates by seeds.

The flowers are used to make an herbal tisane that is said to ease digestion.
