= Coleophora hermanniella =

Scientific classification
- Kingdom: Animalia
- Phylum: Arthropoda
- Class: Insecta
- Order: Lepidoptera
- Family: Coleophoridae
- Genus: Coleophora
- Species: C. hermanniella

Binomial name
- Coleophora hermanniella Walsingham, 1898

Synonyms
- Coleophora rugulosa Toll, 1944

Species of moth

Coleophora hermanniella is a moth of the family Coleophoridae. It is found on Corsica.

The larvae feed on Anthyllis hermanniae. They feed on the generative organs of their host plant.
