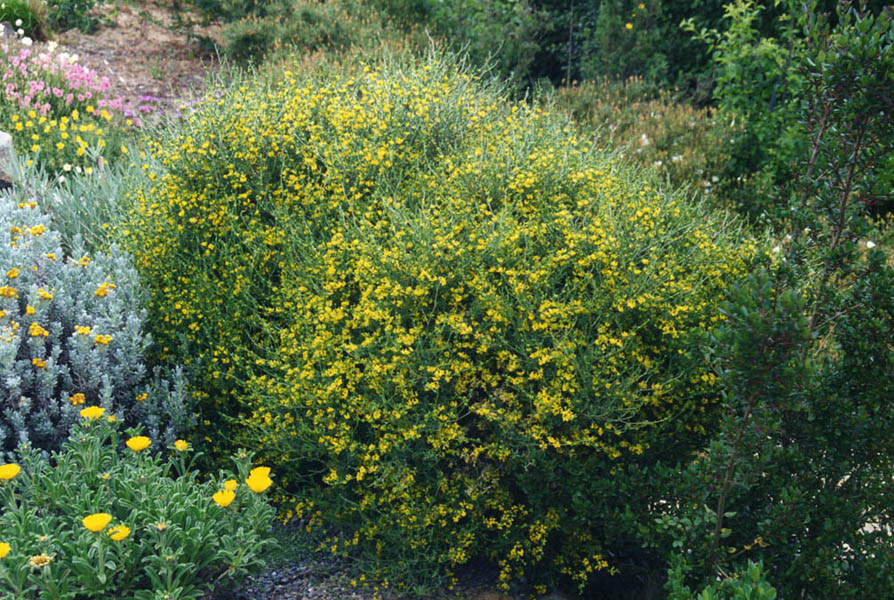

Scientific classification
- Kingdom: Plantae
- Clade: Tracheophytes
- Clade: Angiosperms
- Clade: Eudicots
- Clade: Rosids
- Order: Fabales
- Family: Fabaceae
- Subfamily: Faboideae
- Genus: Anthyllis
- Species: A. hermanniae

Binomial name
- Anthyllis hermanniae L.

Synonyms
- List: Aspalathoides aspalathi (Ser.) K.Koch; Aspalathoides hermanniae (L.) K.Koch; Aspalathus cretica L.; Aspalathus erinacea Lam.; Aspalathus spiniflora L'Hér. ex Steud.; Barba-jovis linearifolia Moench; Cytisus graecus L.; Fakeloba cretica (L.) Raf.; Genista albanica F.K.Mey.; Genista cretica (L.) Spach; Spartium creticum (L.) Desf.; Zenopogon herrmanniae (L.) Link

= Anthyllis hermanniae =

Species of plant in the legume family

Anthyllis hermanniae, called the lavender-leaved anthyllis, is a species of flowering plant in the family Fabaceae. It is found in Anatolia, Greece, the Balkans, and many Mediterranean islands, including Corsica. Coleophora hermanniella, a species of moth found only on Corsica, feeds exclusively on A. hermanniae. A low perennial shrub, it is cultivated as a garden plant, and was formerly cultivated as far north as the United Kingdom, until the great frost of 1739 wiped them out there.

A. hermanniae is typically 1.5–2 feet (0.46–0.61 m) tall, with crooked or zig-zag branches. The leaves are simple or trifoliate, with soft silky hairs (more on the underside than the top). This plant grows in a variety of habitats, but requires good drainage, often growing in rocky locations. It produces yellow flowers in late spring-early summer.

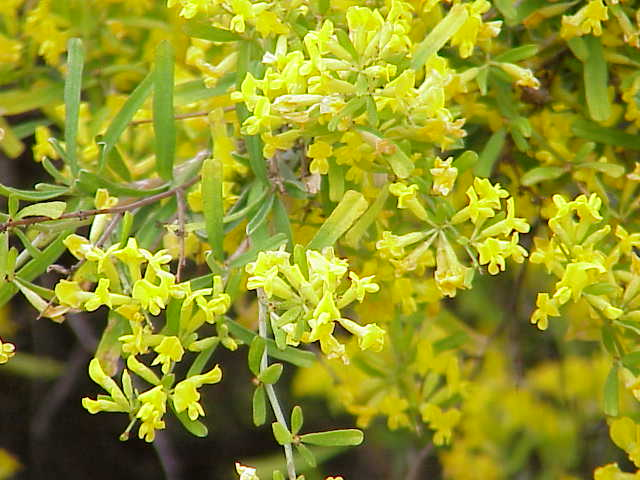
Close-up of flowers and leaves

== Subspecies ==
Currently accepted subspecies are:

- Anthyllis hermanniae subsp. brutia Brullo & Giusso – southern Italy
- Anthyllis hermanniae subsp. corsica Brullo & Giusso – Corsica, Tuscan Archipelago (Gorgona Island)
- Anthyllis hermanniae subsp. hermanniae – Albania, East Aegean Islands, Greece, Crete, western Turkey, Turkey-in-Europe, and former Yugoslavia
- Anthyllis hermanniae subsp. ichnusae Brullo & Giusso – east-central Sardinia
- Anthyllis hermanniae subsp. japygica Brullo & Giusso – southern Italy
- Anthyllis hermanniae subsp. melitensis Brullo & Giusso – Malta
- Anthyllis hermanniae subsp. sicula Brullo & Giusso – southern Sicily
