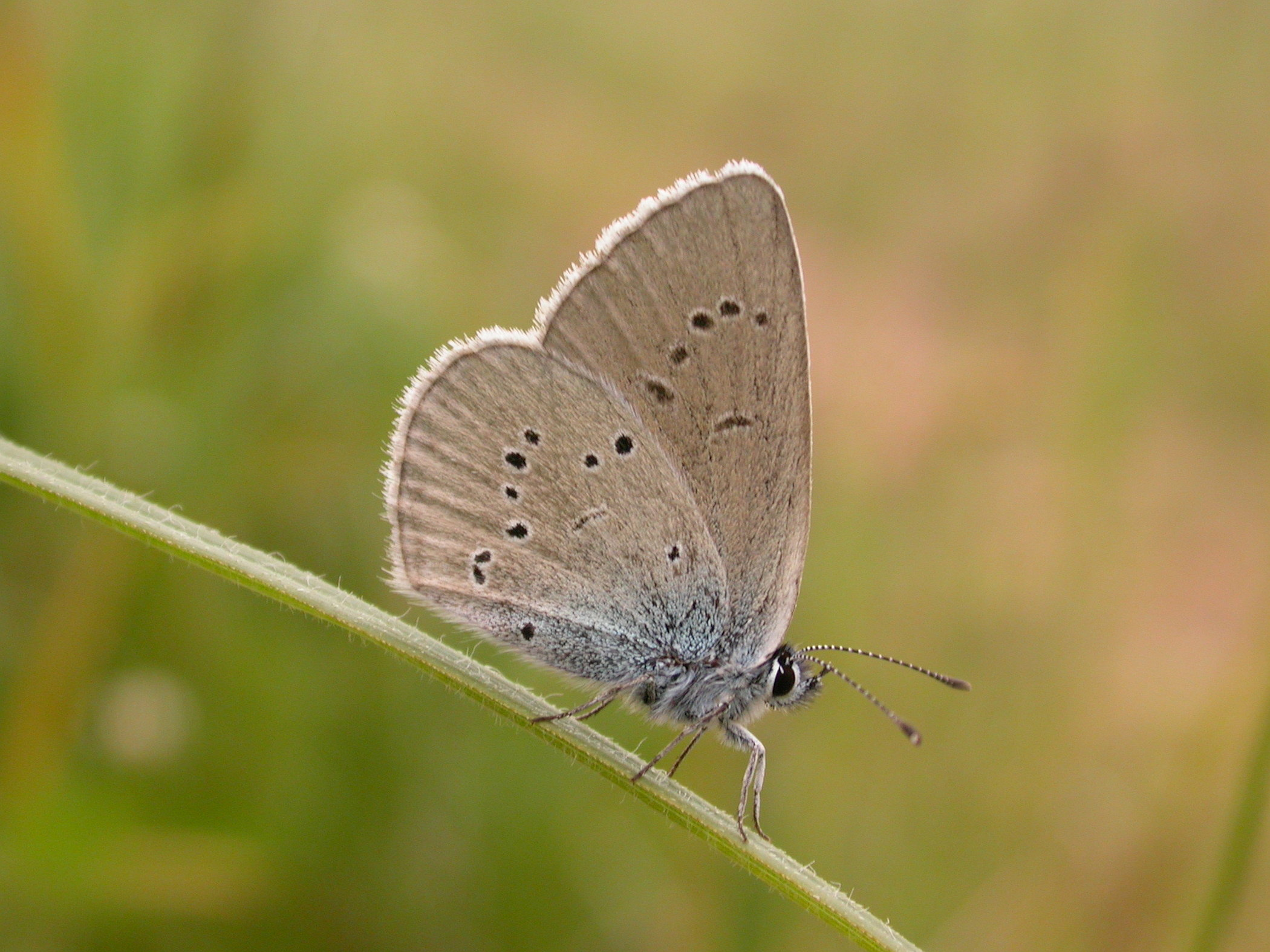
- Cyaniris semiargus

Scientific classification
- Domain: Eukaryota
- Kingdom: Animalia
- Phylum: Arthropoda
- Class: Insecta
- Order: Lepidoptera
- Family: Lycaenidae
- Subfamily: Polyommatinae
- Tribe: Polyommatini
- Genus: Cyaniris; Dalman, 1816

Synonyms
- Nomiades Hübner, [1819]; Glaucolinea Wang & Rehn, 1999

= Cyaniris =

Butterfly genus in family Lycaenidae

Cyaniris is a genus of butterflies in the family Lycaenidae.

Recent molecular studies have determined that Cyaniris is a different genus from Polyommatus, where it has been included for several years.

== Species ==
Two species are recognized:

- Cyaniris semiargus (Rottemburg, 1775)
- Cyaniris bellis (Freyer, 1845)
