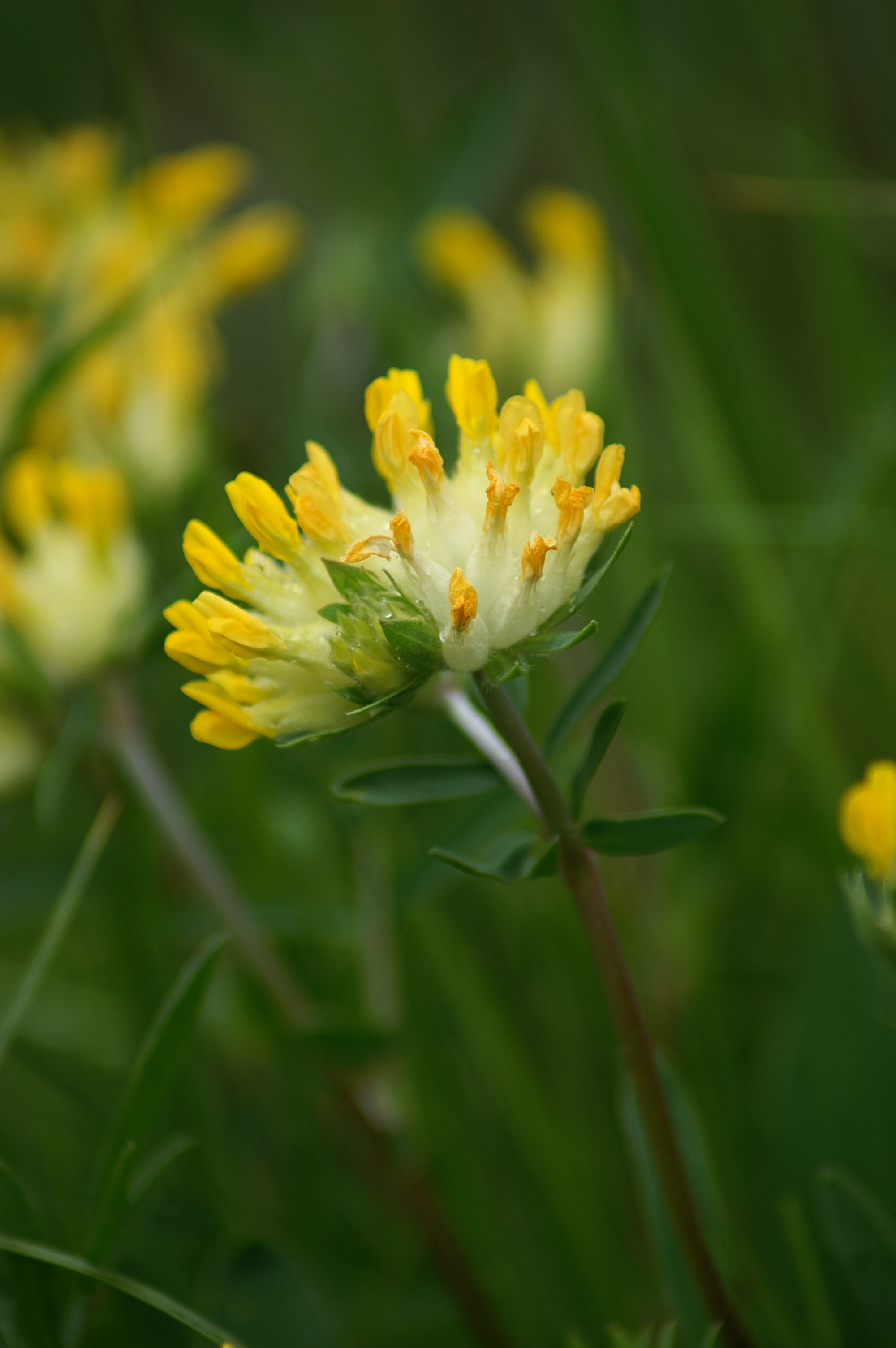
- Anthyllis vulneraria

Scientific classification
- Kingdom: Plantae
- Clade: Tracheophytes
- Clade: Angiosperms
- Clade: Eudicots
- Clade: Rosids
- Order: Fabales
- Family: Fabaceae
- Subfamily: Faboideae
- Clade: Robinioids
- Tribe: Loteae
- Genus: Anthyllis; L. (1753)

Sections and species
- See text

Synonyms
- Aspalathoides (DC.) K.Koch (1853); Barba-jovis Adans. (1763); Circinnus Medik. (1787); Cornicina Boiss. (1840); Fakeloba Raf. (1838); Hymenocarpos Savi (1798); Pogonitis Rchb. (1837); Vulneraria Mill. (1754); Zenopogon Link (1831)

= Anthyllis =

Genus of legumes

Anthyllis is a genus of flowering plants in the family Fabaceae. This genus contains both herbaceous and shrubby species and is distributed in Europe, the Middle East and North Africa. The most widespread and familiar species is A. vulneraria (kidney vetch), a familiar grassland flower which has also been introduced to New Zealand.

Anthyllis species are used as food plants by the larvae of some Lepidoptera species including the following case-bearers of the genus Coleophora: C. acanthyllidis, C. protecta (both feed exclusively on A. tragacanthoides), C. hermanniella (feeds exclusively on A. hermanniae), C. vestalella (feeds exclusively on A. cytisoides) and C. vulnerariae (feeds exclusively on A. vulneraria).

== Species ==
Anthyllis comprises the following species:

=== Section Anthyllis ===
- Anthyllis lemanniana Lowe
- Anthyllis vulneraria L.
  - subsp. abyssinica (Sagorski) Cullen
  - subsp. ajmasiana (Pau) Raynaud & Sauvage
  - subsp. alpestris (Hegetschw.) Asch. & Graebn.
  - subsp. alpicola (Brugg.) Gutermann
  - subsp. argyrophylla (Rothm.) Cullen
  - subsp. arundana (Boiss. & Reut.) Vasc.
  - subsp. atlantis Emb. & Maire
  - subsp. balearica (Coss. ex Mares & Vigin.) O. Bolos & Vigo
  - subsp. boissieri (Sagorski) Bornm.
  - subsp. borealis (Rouy) Jalas
  - subsp. bulgarica (Sagorski) Cullen
  - subsp. calcicola (Schur) Simk.
  - subsp. carpatica (Pant.) Nyman
  - subsp. colorata (Juz.) Tzvelev
  - subsp. corbierei (Salmon & Travis) Cullen
  - subsp. fatmae Font Quer
  - subsp. forondae (Sennen) Cullen
  - subsp. fruticans Emb.
  - subsp. gandogeri (Sagorski) Maire
  - subsp. hispidissima (Sagorski) Cullen
  - subsp. iberica (W.Becker) Jalas
  - subsp. iframensis Cullen
  - subsp. insularum (Rothm.) Romo
  - subsp. lapponica Hyl.
  - subsp. lusitanica (Cullen & P. Silva) Franco
  - subsp. maritima (Hagen) Corb.
  - subsp. matris-filiae Emb. & Maire
  - subsp. maura (Beck) Maire
  - subsp. microcephala (Willk.) Benedi
  - subsp. nivalis (Willk.) Rivas Mart. & al.
  - subsp. pindicola Cullen
  - subsp. polyphylla (DC.) "Nyman, p.p."
  - subsp. praeporea (A. Kern.) Bornm.
  - subsp. pseudoarundana H. Lindb.
  - subsp. pulchella (Vis.) Bornm.
  - subsp. pyrenaica (Beck) Cullen
  - subsp. reuteri Cullen
  - subsp. rifana (Emb. & Maire) Cullen
  - subsp. rubriflora (DC.) Arcang.
  - subsp. saharae (Sagorski) Maire
  - subsp. sampaiana (Rothm.) Vasc.
  - subsp. schiwereckii (DC.) Tzvelev
  - subsp. stenophylloides Cullen
  - subsp. vitellina (Velen.) Kuzmanov
  - subsp. vulneraria L.
    - var. font-queri (Rothm.) Cullen
    - var. macedonica (Degen & Dörfl.) Micevski & Matevski
    - var. vulneraria L.
  - subsp. vulnerarioides (All.) Arcang.
  - subsp. weldeniana (Rchb.) Cullen

=== Section Barba-Jovis ===
- Anthyllis aurea Welden
- Anthyllis barba-jovis L.
- Anthyllis hermanniae L.
- Anthyllis hystrix (Barcelo) Cardona & al.
- Anthyllis splendens Willd.

=== Section Cornicina ===
- Anthyllis circinnata (L.) Savi
- Anthyllis cornicina L.
- Anthyllis hamosa Desf.
- Anthyllis lotoides L.

=== Section Dorycnioides ===
- Anthyllis onobrychoides Cav.
- Anthyllis polycephala Desf.
- Anthyllis ramburii Boiss.
- Anthyllis rupestris Coss.
- Anthyllis tejedensis Boiss.
  - subsp. plumosa (E. Domínguez) Benedí
  - subsp. tejedensis Boiss.
- Anthyllis warnieri Emb.

=== Section Oreanthyllis ===
- Anthyllis lagascana Benedi
- Anthyllis montana L.
  - subsp. atropurpurea (Vuk.) Pignatti
  - subsp. hispanica (Degen & Hervier) Cullen
  - subsp. montana L.
  - subsp. jacquinii (A.Kern.) Hayek

=== Section Terniflora ===
- Anthyllis cytisoides L.
- Anthyllis terniflora (Lag.) Pau

=== Incertae Sedis ===
- Anthyllis aegaea Turrill
- Anthyllis coccinea (L.) Beck
- Anthyllis fennica (Jalas) Akulova
- Anthyllis hegetschweileri (Hegetschweiler-Bodmer) Brügger
- Anthyllis henoniana Coss.
- Anthyllis hispidissima (Sagorski) W. Becker
- Anthyllis langei (Jalas) G. H. Loos
- Anthyllis pallidiflora (Jord. ex Sagorski) Prain
- Anthyllis polyphylloides Juz.
- Anthyllis variegata Grossh.
- Anthyllis webbiana Hook.

== Species names with uncertain taxonomic status ==
The status of the following species is unresolved:

- Anthyllis adriatica Beck
- Anthyllis alpina G.Don
- Anthyllis argentea Desv.
- Anthyllis argentea Salisb.
- Anthyllis aspalathoides L.
- Anthyllis asphaltoides L.
- Anthyllis baldensis A.Kern. ex Sagorski
- Anthyllis bicephalos Gilib.
- Anthyllis bicolor Bertol.
- Anthyllis bicolor Bertol. ex Colla
- Anthyllis bicolor Dalla Torre & Sarnth.
- Anthyllis bidentata Munby
- Anthyllis biflora Sol.
- Anthyllis caucasica (Grossh.) Juz.
- Anthyllis chelmea Rothm.
- Anthyllis cherleri Brügger
- Anthyllis cicerifolia Pourr. ex Colmeiro
- Anthyllis circinnata (L.) D.D.Sokoloff
- Anthyllis collina Salisb.
- Anthyllis communis Rouy
- Anthyllis cretica Lam.
- Anthyllis cupensis Lam.
- Anthyllis densifolia Formánek
- Anthyllis depressa Lange
- Anthyllis dinarica Beck
- Anthyllis expallens Dalla Torre & Sarnth.
- Anthyllis flava Gouan
- Anthyllis fuersteinii Murr
- Anthyllis genistoides Dufour
- Anthyllis glaucescens Kit.
- Anthyllis gracilis Salisb.
- Anthyllis guyoti Chodat
- Anthyllis herzegovina Sagorski
- Anthyllis heterophylla L.
- Anthyllis hosmarensis Pau
- Anthyllis hystrix (Willk. ex F. Barcelo) M. A. Cardona, J. Contandriopoulus & E. Sierra
- Anthyllis indica Lour.
- Anthyllis italica Loudon
- Anthyllis jancheniana K.Malý ex Asch. & Graebn.
- Anthyllis kerneri Sagorski
- Anthyllis kosanini Degen
- Anthyllis lateriflora Pau
- Anthyllis leguminosa Gray
- Anthyllis linifolia L.
- Anthyllis lybica Rothm.
- Anthyllis macrocarpa Walp.
- Anthyllis media Pau
- Anthyllis mogadorensis Rothm.
- Anthyllis moncephalos Gilib.
- Anthyllis montana subsp. jacquinii (Rchb. f.) Rohlena
- Anthyllis multicaulis (Lam.) Pau
- Anthyllis numidica Coss. & Durieu
- Anthyllis occidentalis Rothm.
- Anthyllis onoides Burm.f.
- Anthyllis oreigenes Dalla Torre & Sarnth.
- Anthyllis pallida Opiz ex Nyman
- Anthyllis pentaphylla Steud.
- Anthyllis pseudo-arundana H. Lindb.
- Anthyllis pseudoarundanum H.Lindb.
- Anthyllis pseudo-cytisus Walp.
- Anthyllis pseudo-vulneraria Sagorski
- Anthyllis pubescens Stokes
- Anthyllis quinqueflora L.f.
- Anthyllis rubra Gouan
- Anthyllis rubriflora (Ser.) Degen
- Anthyllis rubriflora Hegetschw.
- Anthyllis rustica Mill.
- Anthyllis rusticana Wender.
- Anthyllis sanguinea Schur
- Anthyllis sericata Chatenier ex Rouy
- Anthyllis serpentini Bruegger ex Sagorski
- Anthyllis subdinarica Sagorski
- Anthyllis tangerina Pau
- Anthyllis tenuicaulis (Sagorski) Fritsch
- Anthyllis tirolensis Dalla Torre & Sarnth.
- Anthyllis tournefortii Schult. ex Steud.
- Anthyllis variicolor Jeanj.
- Anthyllis variiflora Dalla Torre & Sarnth.
- Anthyllis versicolor Dalla Torre & Sarnth.
- Anthyllis visciflora L.f.
- Anthyllis vulneraria subsp. balearica (Coss. ex Marès & Vigin.) O.Bolòs & Vigo
- Anthyllis vulneraria subsp. boscii Kerguelen
- Anthyllis vulneraria subsp. dertosensis (Rothm.) Font Quer
- Anthyllis vulneraria subsp. multifolia (W.Becker) O.Bolòs & Vigo
- Anthyllis vulneraria subsp. nana (Ten.) Tammaro
- Anthyllis vulneraria subsp. saharae (Sagorski) Jahand. & Maire
- Anthyllis vulneraria subsp. vulneraria var. bulgarica (Sagorski) Micevski & Matevski
- Anthyllis vulneraria subsp. vulneraria var. nana Ten.
- Anthyllis vulneraria subsp. vulneraria var. rubriflora DC.
- Anthyllis vulnernarioides Bonj. ex Reichb.
- Hymenocarpos nummularius (DC.) G. Don
- Hymenocarpos radiatus (L.) Cav.
- Hymenocarpos radiatus Link

== Hybrids ==
The following hybrids have been described:

- Anthyllis ×baltica Juz. ex Z.V.Klochkova
- Anthyllis ×cazulensis Rivas Goday & Esteve Chueca
- Anthyllis ×currasii P.P. Ferrer, Roselló & Guara (= Anthyllis cytisoides (Lag.) Pau × Anthyllis lagascana Benedí)
- Anthyllis ×fortuita Guara & P.P.Ferrer
- Anthyllis ×polyphylloides Juz.
