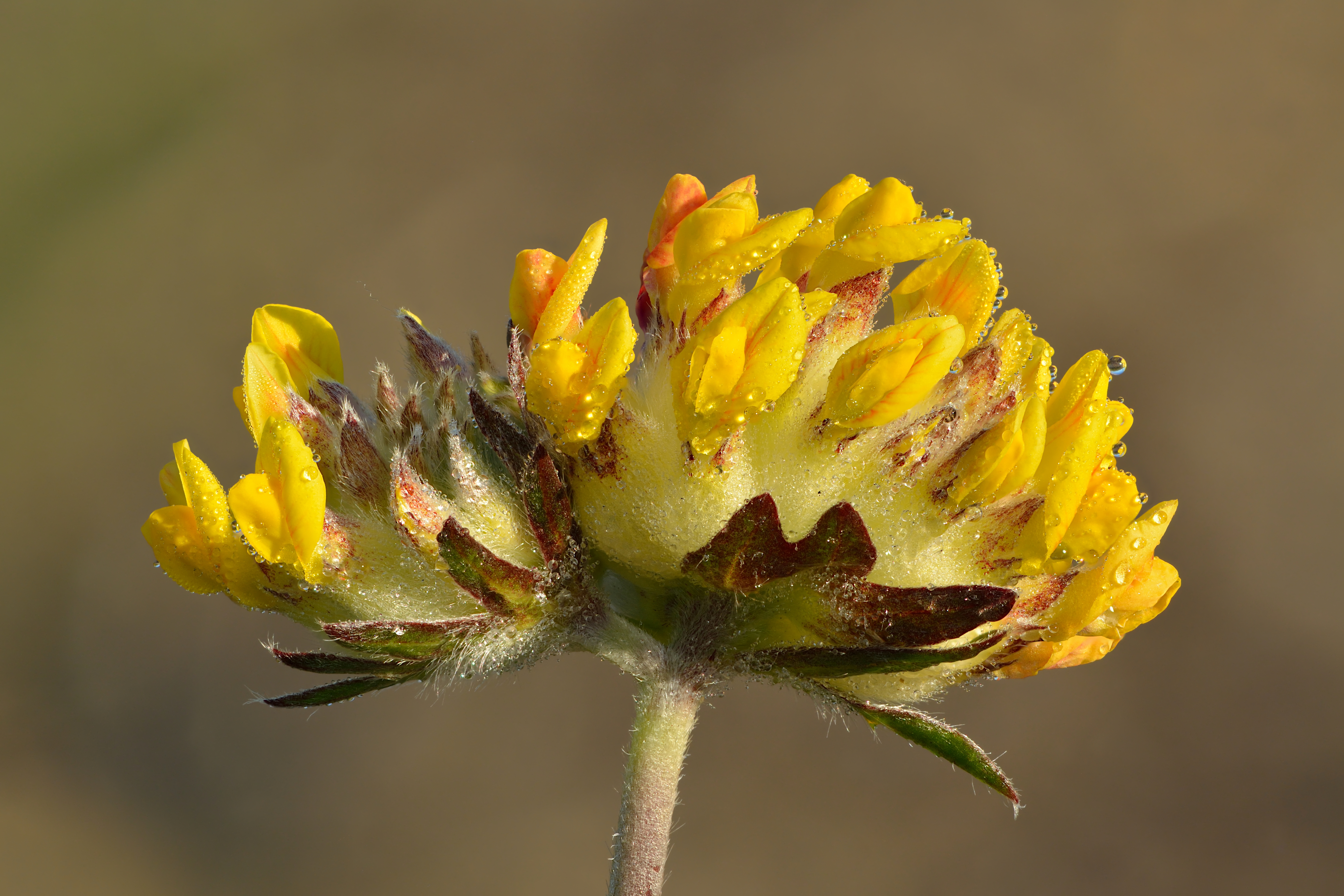

Scientific classification
- Kingdom: Plantae
- Clade: Tracheophytes
- Clade: Angiosperms
- Clade: Eudicots
- Clade: Rosids
- Order: Fabales
- Family: Fabaceae
- Subfamily: Faboideae
- Genus: Anthyllis
- Species: A. vulneraria

Binomial name
- Anthyllis vulneraria L.

Synonyms
- List: Anthyllis abyssinica (Sagorski) W.Becker; Anthyllis affinis A.Kern.; Anthyllis affinis sensu auct. fl. URSS; Anthyllis albana Wettst.; Anthyllis albana var. macedonica Degen & Dörfl.; Anthyllis alpestris Hegetschweiler-Bodmer; Anthyllis alpestris Rchb.; Anthyllis alpestris (Schult.) Kit.; Anthyllis alpicola Brugger; Anthyllis arenaria (Rupr.) Juz.; Anthyllis argyrophylla Rothm.; Anthyllis arundana Boiss. & Reut.; Anthyllis asturiae W.Becker; Anthyllis balearica Coss. ex Mares & Vigin.; Anthyllis biebersteiniana Popl.; Anthyllis boissieri (Sagorski) Grossh.; Anthyllis bonjeanii Beck; Anthyllis carpatica Pantol.; Anthyllis coccinea subsp. pyrenaica Beck; Anthyllis colorata Juz.; Anthyllis daghestanica Chinth.; Anthyllis dillenii Don; Anthyllis dillenii Schult. ex Steud.; Anthyllis dillenii sensu auct.; Anthyllis dillenii var. praepropera A. Kern.; Anthyllis font-queri Rothm.; Anthyllis forondae Sennen; Anthyllis gandogeri (Sagorski) W. Becker; Anthyllis hispida Boiss. & Reut.; Anthyllis hispidissima (Sagorski) W. Becker; Anthyllis illyrica Beck; Anthyllis insularum Rothm.; Anthyllis kuzenevae Juz.; Anthyllis lachnophora Juz.; Anthyllis linnaei (Sagorski) Juz.; Anthyllis lusitanica Cullen & P. Silva; Anthyllis macrocephala Wender.; Anthyllis macrocephala var. schiwereckii (DC.) Soo; Anthyllis maritima Hagen; Anthyllis maritima Scweig.; Anthyllis maura Beck; Anthyllis maura var. ajmasiana Pau; Anthyllis nivalis (Willk.) Beck; Anthyllis pachyphylla Rothm.; Anthyllis polyphylla (DC.) Don; Anthyllis polyphylla (DC.) Kit. ex G. Don; Anthyllis polyphylla Kit. ex DC.; Anthyllis praepropera (A.Kern.) Beck; Anthyllis pseudovulneraria Sagorski; Anthyllis pulchella (Vis.) Vis.; Anthyllis rosea Willk.; Anthyllis rubicunda Wender.; Anthyllis rubicunda Wender. ex Steud.; Anthyllis saharae Sagorski; Anthyllis saharae (Sagorski) W. Becker; Anthyllis sampaiana Rothm.; Anthyllis sampaioana Rothm.; Anthyllis scardica Wettst.; Anthyllis schiwereckii (DC.) Blocki; Anthyllis schiwerescii (DC.) Blocki; Anthyllis serpentinicola Rech.f. & Goulimy; Anthyllis spruneri (Boiss.) Beck; Anthyllis spruneri Heldr. ex Nyman; Anthyllis spruneri subsp. iberica W. Becker; Anthyllis spruneri var. bulgarica Sagorski; Anthyllis taurica Juz.; Anthyllis tricolor Vuk.; Anthyllis valesiaca Beck; Anthyllis vulgaris A.Kern.; Anthyllis vulgaris (W. D. J. Koch) A. Kern.; Anthyllis vulneraria subsp. corbierei (C.E.Salmon & Travis) Cullen; Anthyllis vulneraria subsp. dillenii sensu auct.; Anthyllis vulneraria subsp. fennica (Jalas) Z.V.Kloczkova; Anthyllis vulneraria subsp. hispida (Boiss. & Reut.) Cout.; Anthyllis vulneraria subsp. linnaei Sagorski; Anthyllis vulneraria subsp. macedonica (Degen & Dörfl.) Micevski & Matevski; Anthyllis vulneraria subsp. praepropera (A.Kern.) Bornm.; Anthyllis vulneraria subsp. spruneri (Boiss.) Bornm.; Anthyllis vulneraria subsp. vulgaris (Koch) Corb.; Anthyllis vulneraria var. biebersteiniana Taliev; Anthyllis vulneraria var. calcicola Schur; Anthyllis vulneraria var. colorata (Juz.) Lampinen; Anthyllis vulneraria var. insularum (Rothm.) O. Bolòs & Vigo; Anthyllis vulneraria var. lapponica Hyl.; Anthyllis vulneraria var. polyphylla (DC.) Nyman; Anthyllis vulneraria var. rifana Emb. & Maire; Anthyllis vulneraria var. schiwereckii DC.; Anthyllis vulneraria var. spruneri Boiss.; Anthyllis vulneraria var. vitellina Velen.; Anthyllis vulnerarioides (All.) Bonjean ex Rchb.; Anthyllis webbiana sensu auct.; Anthyllis webbiana var. nivalis Willk.; Anthyllis weldeniana Rchb.; Astragalus vulnerarioides Allioni

= Anthyllis vulneraria =

Species of legume

Anthyllis vulneraria, the common kidneyvetch, kidney vetch or woundwort is a medicinal plant native to Europe, northern Africa, and Western Asia. The specific epithet vulneraria means 'wound healer'.

== Description ==
Anthyllis vulneraria reaches 5–40 centimetres (2.0–15.7 in) in height. The stem is simple or more often branched. The leaves are imparipinnate, glabrous or with scattered hairs on the upper face and silky hairs on the underside. The flower heads are spherical in shape and 10–20 millimetres (0.39–0.79 in) long. The petals are yellow in most sub-species, but red in A. vulneraria var. coccinea. Flowering takes place between June and September. The fruit is a legume. The fruits ripening takes place from July to October.

Kidney vetch is the food plant of the small blue butterfly larvae and the leaf miner, Aproaerema anthyllidella.

== Distribution and habitat ==
This plant is sporadic throughout Europe, from Iceland to the Mediterranean, in Asia Minor up to Iran, in North Africa and in Ethiopia. It is naturalized in North America. It prefers dry grasslands and rocky environments with calcareous soil, up to 3,000 m (9,800 ft) in elevation.

== Subspecies ==
This species includes numerous subspecies, with 47 accepted by Plants of the World Online. Some authors elevate these to the role of separate species.

- A. vulneraria subsp. abyssinica (Sagorski) Cullen – Eritrea and Ethiopia
- A. vulneraria subsp. ajmasiana (Pau) Raynaud & Sauvage – Morocco
- A. vulneraria subsp. alpestris (Kit.) Asch. et Gr. – European mountains
- A. vulneraria subsp. argyrophylla (Rothm.) Cullen – southern Spain
- A. vulneraria subsp. arundana (Boiss. & Reut.) H.Lindb. – southern Spain
- A. vulneraria subsp. baldensis (Sagorski) Pignatti ex Kerguélen – southwestern and southern Alps
- A. vulneraria subsp. balearica (Coss. ex Marès & Vigin.) O.Bolòs & Vigo – Balearic Islands
- A. vulneraria subsp. boissieri (Sagorski) Bornm. – Crimean Peninsula, Caucasus, Turkey, and northern Iran
- A. vulneraria subsp. borealis (Rouy) Jalas – western Iceland
- A. vulneraria subsp. boscii Kerguélen – northwestern Spain and Pyrenees
- A. vulneraria subsp. bulgarica (Sagorski) Cullen – Balkan Peninsula
- A. vulneraria subsp. busambarensis (Lojac.) Pign. – Sicily
- A. vulneraria subsp. carpatica (Pant.) Nyman – western and central Europe
- A. vulneraria subsp. colorata (Juz.) Tzvelev (synonym: Anthyllis colorata Juz.) – Baltic states, northwestern and central European Russia
- A. vulneraria subsp. corbierei (Salmon & Travis) Cullen – southwestern Great Britain, Channel Islands, northwestern France
- A. vulneraria subsp. danica Lampinen – Denmark
- A. vulneraria subsp. dertosensis (Rothm.) Font Quer – Spain
- A. vulneraria subsp. fatmae Font Quer – northern Morocco
- A. vulneraria subsp. forondae (Sennen) Cullen – northeastern Spain, Pyrenees, and southwestern Alps
- A. vulneraria subsp. fruticans Emb. – Morocco
- A. vulneraria subsp. gandogeri (Sagorski) Maire – Iberian Peninsula, Balearic Islands, and northern Morocco
- A. vulneraria subsp. guyotii (Chodat) Grenon – western Alps
- A. vulneraria subsp. hispidissima (Sagorski) Cullen – north Macedonia, northeastern Greece, and Turkey
- A. vulneraria subsp. iberica (W.Becker) Jalas – coasts of Western Europe from Belgium to Portugal
- A. vulneraria subsp. iframensis Cullen – Morocco
- A. vulneraria var. langei Jalas – coasts of Western Europe from Denmark to France and the British Isles
- A. vulneraria subsp. lapponica (Hyl.) Jalas – British Isles, Scandinavia, Baltic States, Belarus, Ukraine, and northern and central Russia
- A. vulneraria subsp. maritima (Schweigg. ex K.G.Hagen) Corb. – southern Baltic coast to northern and central Russia
- A. vulneraria subsp. matris-filiae Emb. & Maire – southern and eastern Spain, northern Morocco
- A. vulneraria subsp. maura (Beck) Lindb. – North Africa, Iberian Peninsula, Italy and Sicily, Syria and Lebanon
- A. vulneraria subsp. microcephala (Willk.) Benedí – Spain
- A. vulneraria subsp. multifolia (W.Becker) O.Bolòs & Vigo – Spain
- A. vulneraria subsp. nana (Ten.) Tammaro – Italy (central Apennines)
- A. vulneraria subsp. pinidicola Cullen – Greece, Crete, and former Yugoslavia
- A. vulneraria subsp. polyphylla (D.C.) Nyman – France, Italy, Denmark, Central Europe, northern Balkan Peninsula, European Russia, Caucasus, and Turkey
- A. vulneraria subsp. polyphylla (D.C.) Nyman × affinis Brittinger ex Kerner
- A. vulneraria subsp. pseudoarundana H.Lindb. – Morocco and southern and eastern Spain
- A. vulneraria subsp. pulchella (Vis.) Bornm. – southeastern Europe, Crimean Peninsula, Caucasus, and Turkey
- A. vulneraria subsp. rubriflora (DC.) Arcang. (synonym A. vulneraria subsp. praepropera (Kerner) Bornm.) – France and the Balearic Islands through southern Europe to Israel
- A. vulneraria subsp. saharae (Sagorski) Jahand. & Maire – Algeria and Morocco
- A. vulneraria subsp. subscaposa Cullen – Transcaucasus
- A. vulneraria subsp. valesiaca (Becker) Guyot – France, Italy, and Switzerland
- A. vulneraria subsp. variegata (Boiss. ex Beck) Bornm. – Caucasus to southern Turkey
- A. vulneraria subsp. versicolor (Dalla Torre & Sarnth.) Gutermann – Austria, Italy, Switzerland, and former Yugoslavia
- A. vulneraria subsp. vitellina (Velen.) Kuzmanov – Bulgaria
- A. vulneraria subsp. vulneraria L. – western and northern Europe to northern and eastern European Russia
- A. vulneraria subsp. vulnerarioides (All.) Arcang. – southwestern Alps, Pyrenees, and Corsica
- A. vulneraria subsp. vulnerarioides (All.) Arcang. × bonjeanii Beck
- A. vulneraria subsp. weldeniana (Rchb.) Cullen – northeastern Italy and northwestern Balkan Peninsula
- A. vulneraria subsp. weldeniana (Rchb.) Cullen × tricolor Vukot.
- A. vulneraria subsp. weldeniana (Rchb.) Cullen × versicolor Sagorski

== Gallery ==
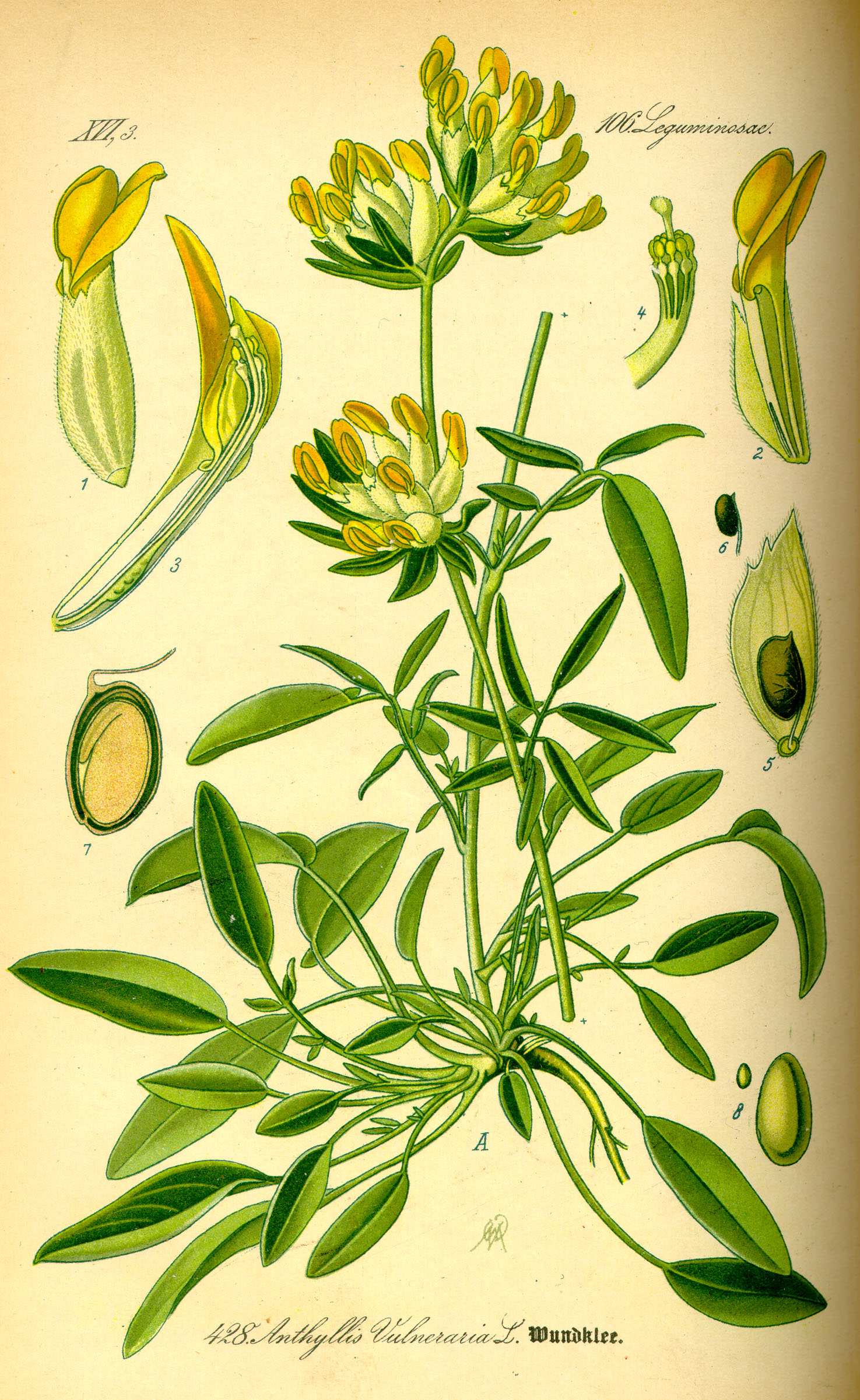
1885 illustration

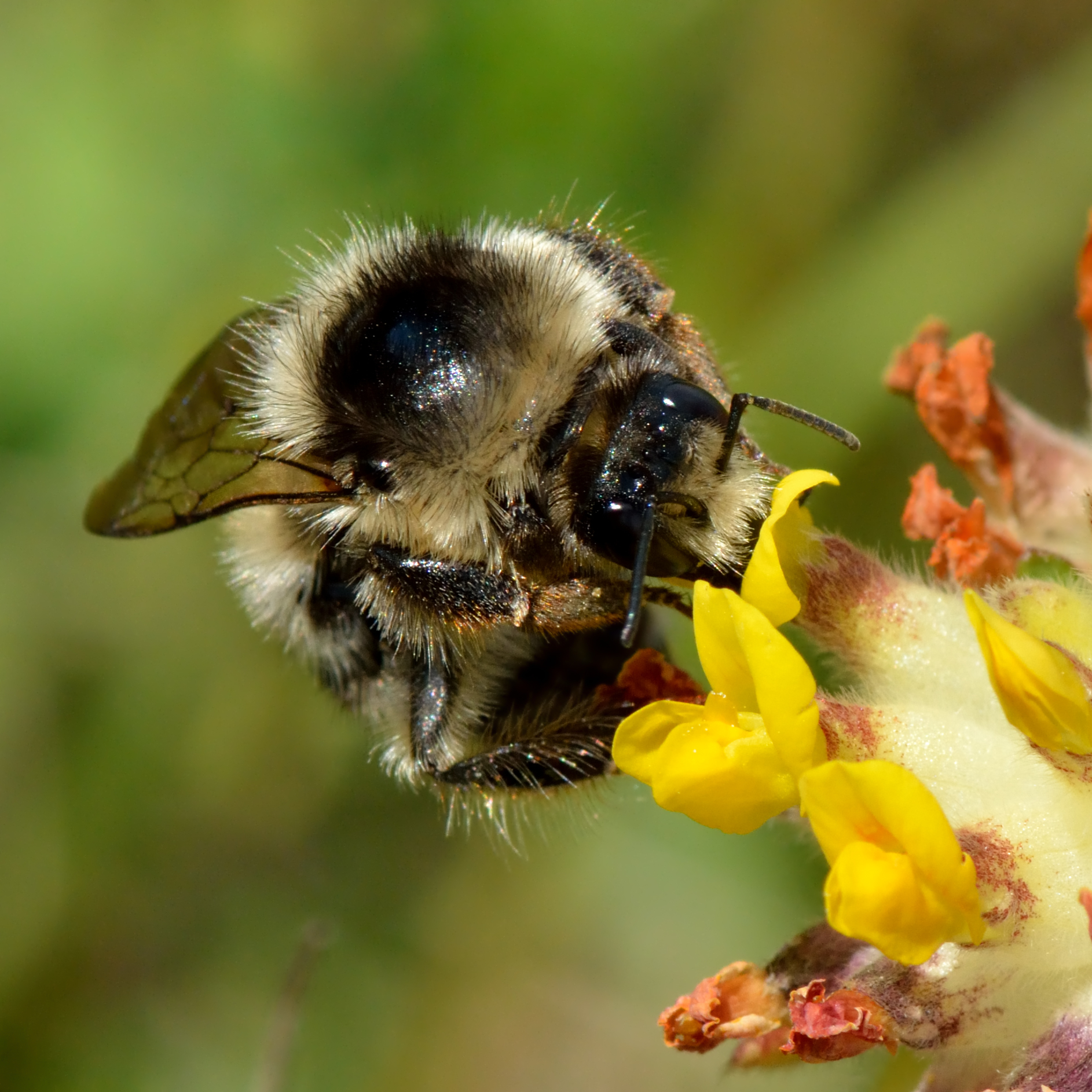
Kidney vetch provides pollen and nectar for a wide range of insects, particularly bumblebees

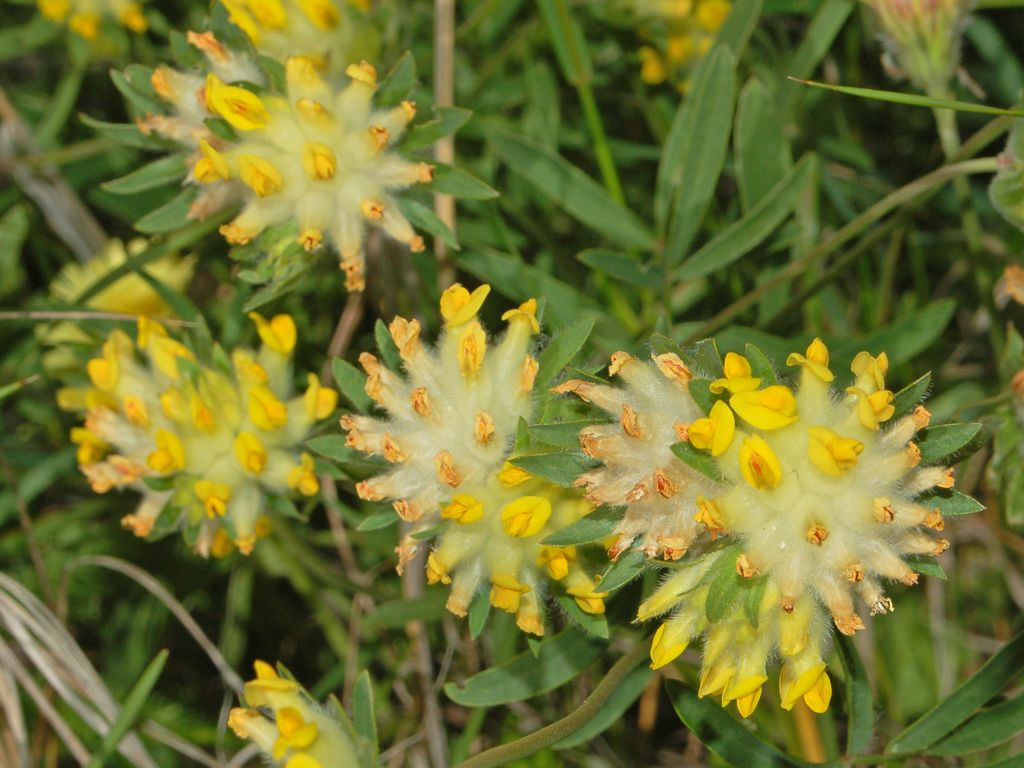
Inflorescences

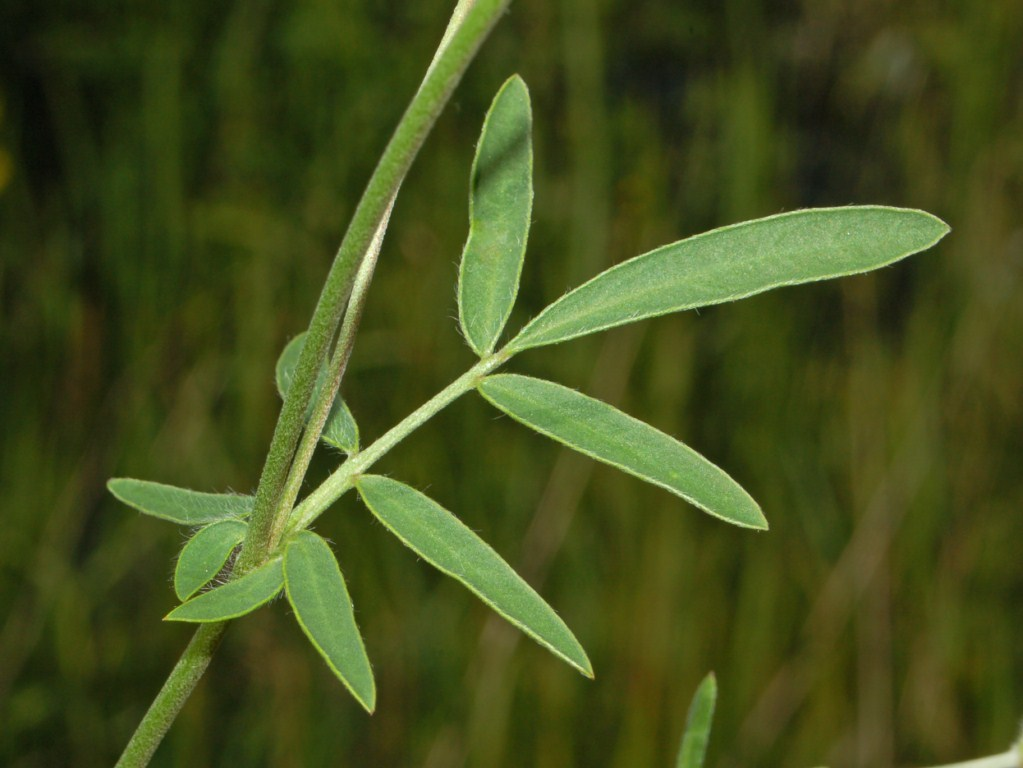
Leaves
