= List of moths of Russia (Noctuoidea) =

This is a list of the Russian moth species of the superfamily Noctuoidea. It also acts as an index to the species articles and forms part of the full List of moths of Russia.

== Notodontidae ==
- Allodonta plebeja (Oberthür, 1881)
- Besaia pallida (Butler, 1877)
- Cerura erminea (Esper, 1783)
- Cerura felina Butler, 1877
- Cerura vinula (Linnaeus, 1758)
- Clostera albosigma (Fitch, 1856)
- Clostera anachoreta (Denis & Schiffermüller), 1775)
- Clostera anastomosis (Linnaeus, 1758)
- Clostera curtula (Linnaeus, 1758)
- Clostera pigra (Hufnagel, 1766)
- Cnethodonta grisescens Staudinger, 1887
- Dicranura tsvetaevi Schintlmeister & Sviridov, 1985
- Dicranura ulmi (Denis & Schiffermüller, 1775)
- Drymonia dodonaea ([Denis & Schiffermüller], 1775)
- Drymonia dodonides (Staudinger, 1887)
- Drymonia japonica (Wileman, 1911)
- Drymonia obliterata (Esper, 1785)
- Drymonia querna ([Denis & Schiffermüller], 1775)
- Drymonia ruficornis (Hufnagel, 1766)
- Drymonia velitaris (Hufnagel, 1766)
- Eligmodonta ziczac (Linnaeus, 1758)
- Ellida albimacula (Staudinger, 1877)
- Ellida arcuata Alphéraky, 1897
- Ellida branickii (Oberthür, 1881)
- Ellida viridimixta (Bremer, 1861)
- Epinotodonta fumosa Matsumura, 1920
- Epinotodonta leucodera (Staudinger, 1887)
- Epodonta lineata (Oberthür, 1881)
- Euhampsonia cristata (Butler, 1877)
- Euhampsonia splendida (Oberthür, 1880)
- Fentonia ocypete (Bremer, 1861)
- Furcula aeruginosa (Christoph, 1872)
- Furcula bicuspis (Borkhausen, 1790)
- Furcula bifida (Brahm, 1787)
- Furcula furcula (Clerck, 1759)
- Furcula interrupta (Christoph, 1867)
- Furcula petri (Alphéraky, 1882)
- Gluphisia crenata (Esper, 1785)
- Gonoclostera timoniorum (Bremer, 1864)
- Hagapteryx admirabiilis (Staudinger, 1887)
- Hagapteryx mirabilior (Oberthür, 1911)
- Harpyia milhauseri (Fabricius, 1775)
- Harpyia tokui (Sugi, 1977)
- Harpyia umbrosa (Staudinger, 1892)
- Hemifentonia mandschurica (Oberthür, 1911)
- Himeropteryx miraculosa Staudinger, 1887
- Hupodonta corticalis Butler, 1877
- Hupodonta lignea Matsumura, 1919
- Leucodonta bicoloria ([Denis & Schiffermüller], 1775)
- Lophocosma atriplaga Staudinger, 1887
- Lophontosia cuculus (Staudinger, 1887)
- Micromelalopha flavomaculata Tschistjakov, 1977
- Micromelalopha sieversi (Staudinger, 1892)
- Micromelalopha troglodyta (Graeser, 1890)
- Microphalera grisea Butler, 1885
- Nerice bipartita Butler, 1885
- Nerice davidi (Oberthür, 1881)
- Nerice leechi (Staudinger, 1892)
- Notodonta dembowskii Oberthür, 1879
- Notodonta dromedarius (Linnaeus, 1758)
- Notodonta jankowskii (Oberthür, 1879)
- Notodonta stigmatica Matsumura, 1920
- Notodonta torva (Hübner, [1803])
- Notodonta tritophus ([Denis & Schiffermüller], 1775)
- Odontosia brinikhi Dubatolov, 2006
- Odontosia carmelita (Esper, 1799)
- Odontosia patricia Stichel, 1918
- Odontosia sieversii (Menetries, 1856)
- Peridea aliena (Staudinger, 1892)
- Peridea anceps (Goeze, 1781)
- Peridea elzet Kiriakoff, 1963
- Peridea gigantea Butler, 1877
- Peridea graeseri (Staudinger, 1892)
- Peridea lativitta (Wileman, 1911)
- Peridea moltrechti (Oberthür, 1911)
- Peridea oberthueri (Staudinger, 1892)
- Phalera assimilis (Bremer & Grey, 1853)
- Phalera bucephala (Linnaeus, 1758)
- Phalera bucephaloides (Ochsenheimer, 1810)
- Phalera flavescens (Bremer & Grey, 1852)
- Phalera takasagoensis Matsumura, 1919
- Phalerodonta bombycina (Oberthür, 1881)
- Pheosia fusiformis Matsumura, 1921
- Pheosia gnoma (Fabricius, 1776)
- Pheosia grummi (Christoph, 1885)
- Pheosia rimosa Packard, 1864
- Pheosia tremula (Clerck, 1759)
- Pheosiopsis cinerea (Butler, 1879)
- Pterostoma grisea (Bremer, 1861)
- Pterostoma palpina (Clerck, 1759)
- Pterostoma sinicum Moore, 1877
- Pterotes eugenia (Staudinger, 1896)
- Ptilodon capucina (Linnaeus, 1758)
- Ptilodon cucullina ([Denis & Schiffermüller], 1775)
- Ptilodon hoegei (Graeser, 1888)
- Ptilodon jezoensis Matsumura, 1919
- Ptilodon ladislai (Oberthür, 1879)
- Ptilodon robusta (Matsumura, 1924)
- Ptilodon saerdabensis (Daniel, 1938)
- Ptilophora jezoensis (Matsumura, 1920)
- Ptilophora nohirae (Matsumura, 1920)
- Ptilophora plumigera ([Denis & Schiffermüller], 1775)
- Pygaera timon (Hübner, 1803)
- Rosama ornata (Oberthür, 1884)
- Semidonta biloba (Oberthür, 1880)
- Shaka atrovittata (Bremer, 1861)
- Spatalia argentina ([Denis & Schiffermüller], 1775)
- Spatalia dives Oberthür, 1884
- Spatalia doerriesi Graeser, 1888
- Spatalia plusiotis (Oberthür, 1880)
- Stauropus basalis Moore, 1877
- Stauropus fagi (Linnaeus, 1758)
- Takadonta takamukui Matsumura, 1920
- Thaumetopoea pinivora (Treitschke, 1834)
- Togepteryx velutina (Oberthür, 1880)
- Torigea straminea (Moore, 1877)
- Uropyia meticulodina (Oberthür, 1884)
- Wilemanus bidentatus (Wileman, 1911) -- Обсидианова пеперуда

== Lymantriidae ==
- Arctornis alba (Bremer, 1861)
- Arctornis l-nigrum (Miller, 1764)
- Calliteara abietis ([Denis & Schiffermüller], 1775)
- Calliteara conjuncta (Wileman, 1911)
- Calliteara lunulata (Butler, 1887)
- Calliteara pseudabietis Butler, 1885
- Calliteara pudibunda (Linnaeus, 1758)
- Calliteara virginea (Oberthür, 1870)
- Cifuna locuples Walker, 1855
- Dicallomera angelus (Tschetverikov, 1904)
- Dicallomera fascelina (Linnaeus, 1758)
- Dicallomera kusnetzovi Lukhtanov & Khruleva, 1989
- Dicallomera olga (Oberthür, 1881)
- Dicallomera pumila (Staudinger, 1881)
- Euproctis chrysorrhoea (Linnaeus, 1758)
- Euproctis karghalica (Moore, 1878)
- Euproctis niphonis (Butler, 1881)
- Euproctis piperita Oberthür, 1880
- Euproctis similis (Fuessly, 1775)
- Euproctis subflava (Bremer, 1864)
- Gynaephora relictus (Bang-Haas, 1927)
- Gynaephora selenitica (Esper, 1783)
- Ivela ochropoda (Eversmann, 1847)
- Laelia coenosa (Hübner, [1808])
- Leucoma candida (Staudinger, 1892)
- Leucoma salicis (Linnaeus, 1758)
- Lymantria dispar (Linnaeus, 1758)
- Lymantria grisescens (Staudinger, 1887)
- Lymantria mathura Walker, 1865
- Lymantria monacha (Linnaeus, 1758)
- Neocifuna eurydice (Butler, 1885)
- Neocifuna jankowskii (Oberthür, 1884)
- Numenes disparilis Staudinger, 1887
- Orgyia antiqua (Linnaeus, 1758)
- Parocneria detrita (Esper, 1785)
- Parocneria furva (Leech, 1889)
- Parocneria signatoria (Christoph, 1883)
- Penthophera morio (Linnaeus, 1767)
- Teia antiquiodes (Hübner, [1822])
- Teia dubia (Tauscher, 1806)
- Teia ochrolimbata (Staudinger, 1881)
- Teia recens (Hübner, [1819])

== Noctuidae ==
- Abromias altijuga (W. Kozhantschikov, 1925)
- Abromias brunnescens Kononenko, 1985
- Abromias commixta (Butler, 1881)
- Abromias ferrago (Eversmann, 1837)
- Abromias furva ([Denis & Schiffermüller], 1775)
- Abromias groenlandica (Duponchel, [1838])
- Abromias hampsoni Sugi, 1963
- Abromias lateritia (Hufnagel, 1766)
- Abromias lithoxylaea ([Denis & Schiffermüller], 1775)
- Abromias maillardi (Geyer, [1834])
- Abromias monoglypha (Hufnagel, 1766)
- Abromias oblonga (Haworth, 1809)
- Abromias platinea (Treitschke, 1825)
- Abromias pseudoaltijuga Grosser, 1985
- Abromias rubrirena (Treitschke, 1825)
- Abromias sublustris (Esper, 1788)
- Abromias veterina (Lederer, 1853)
- Abrostola asclepiadis ([Denis & Schiffermüller], 1775)
- Abrostola clarissa (Staudinger, 1900)
- Abrostola hyrcanica Hacker, 2002
- Abrostola kaszabi Dufay, 1971
- Abrostola korbi Dufay, 1958
- Abrostola pacifica Dufay, 1960
- Abrostola tripartita (Hufnagel, 1766)
- Abrostola triplasia (Linnaeus, 1758)
- Abrostola ussuriensis Dufay, 1958
- Acantholipes regularis (Hübner, [1813])
- Acontia lucida (Hufnagel, 1766)
- Acontia melanura (Tauscher, 1809)
- Acontia olivacea (Hampson, 1891)
- Acontia panaceorum (Menetries, 1849)
- Acontia titania (Esper, 1798)
- Acontia trabealis (Scopoli, 1763)
- Acosmetia biguttula (Motschulsky, 1866)
- Acosmetia caliginosa (Hübner, [1813])
- Acosmetia chinensis (Wallengren, 1860)
- Acronicta aceris (Linnaeus, 1758)
- Acronicta adaucta Warren, 1909
- Acronicta alni (Linnaeus, 1767)
- Acronicta auricoma ([Denis & Schiffermüller], 1775)
- Acronicta bellula Alphéraky, 1895
- Acronicta carbonaria Graeser, [1890]
- Acronicta catocaloida Graeser, [1889]
- Acronicta cinerea (Hufnagel, 1766)
- Acronicta concerpta Draudt, 1937
- Acronicta cuspis (Hübner, [1813])
- Acronicta digna (Butler, 1881)
- Acronicta hercules R.Felder & Rogenhofer, 1874
- Acronicta intermedia Warren, 1909
- Acronicta jozana Matsumura, 1926
- Acronicta leporina (Linnaeus, 1758)
- Acronicta leucocuspis Butler, 1878
- Acronicta lutea Bremer & Grey, 1852
- Acronicta major Bremer, 1861
- Acronicta megacephala ([Denis & Schiffermüller], 1775)
- Acronicta menyanthidis (Esper, 1789)
- Acronicta omorii Matsumura, 1926
- Acronicta psi (Linnaeus, 1758)
- Acronicta raphael Oberthür, 1884
- Acronicta rumicis (Linnaeus, 1758)
- Acronicta strigosa ([Denis & Schiffermüller], 1775)
- Acronicta sugii (Kinoshita, 1990)
- Acronicta tridens ([Denis & Schiffermüller], 1775)
- Acronicta vulpina (Grote, 1883)
- Actebia ala (Staudinger, 1881)
- Actebia difficilis (Erschoff, 1887)
- Actebia fennica (Tauscher, 1837)
- Actebia fugax (Treitschke, 1825)
- Actebia multifida (Lederer, 1870)
- Actebia opisoleuca (Staudinger, 1881)
- Actebia praecox (Linnaeus, 1758)
- Actebia praecurrens (Staudinger, 1888)
- Actebia squalida (Guenée, 1852)
- Actebia taurica (Staudinger, 1879)
- Actinotia intermediata (Bremer, 1861)
- Actinotia polyodon (Clerck, 1759)
- Actinotia radiosa (Esper, 1804)
- Aedia funesta (Esper, 1786)
- Aedia leucomelas (Linnaeus, 1758)
- Aedophron phlebophora Lederer, 1858
- Aedophron rhodites (Eversraan, 1851)
- Aegle kaekeritziana (Hübner, [1799])
- Aegle semicana (Esper, 1798)
- Agrochola circellaris (Hufnagel, 1766)
- Agrochola egorovi (Bang-Haas, 1934)
- Agrochola helvola (Linnaeus, 1758)
- Agrochola humilis ([Denis & Schiffermüller], 1775)
- Agrochola laevis (Hübner, [1803])
- Agrochola litura (Linnaeus, 1758)
- Agrochola lota (Clerck, 1759)
- Agrochola lychnitis ([Denis & Schiffermüller], 1775)
- Agrochola macilenta (Hübner, [1809])
- Agrochola nitida ([Denis & Schiffermüller], 1775)
- Agrochola vulpecula (Lederer, 1853)
- Agrotis bigramma (Esper, [1790])
- Agrotis characteristica Alphéraky, 1892
- Agrotis cinerea ([Denis & Schiffermüller], 1775)
- Agrotis clavis (Hufnagel, 1766)
- Agrotis desertorum Boisduval, 1840
- Agrotis exclamationis (Linnaeus, 1758)
- Agrotis fatidica (Hübner, [1824])
- Agrotis frater Fibiger, Ahola & Nupponen, 2006
- Agrotis humigena Pungeler, [1899]
- Agrotis incognita Staudinger, 1988
- Agrotis ipsilon (Hufnagel, 1766)
- Agrotis iremeli Nupponen, Ahola & Kullberg, 2001
- Agrotis militaris Staudinger, 188810380
- Agrotis murinoides Poole, 1989
- Agrotis obesa (Boisduval, 1829)
- Agrotis psammoda Staudinger, 1895
- Agrotis puta (Hübner, [1803])
- Agrotis ripae (Hübner, [1823])
- Agrotis ruta (Eversmann, 1851)
- Agrotis scotacra (Filipjev, 1927)
- Agrotis segetum ([Denis & Schiffermüller], 1775)
- Agrotis spinifera (Hübner, [1808])
- Agrotis submolesta Pungeler, [1899]
- Agrotis tokionis Butler, 1881
- Agrotis trifurca Eversmann, 1837
- Agrotis trux (Hübner, [1824])
- Agrotis vestigialis (Hufnagel, 1766)
- Agrotis villosus Alphéraky, 1887
- Aiteta curvilinea (Staudinger, 1892)
- Allophyes benedictina (Staudinger, 1892)
- Allophyes oxyacanthae (Linnaeus, 1758)
- Ammoconia caecimacula ([Denis & Schiffermüller], 1775)
- Ammoconia senex (Geyer, 1828)
- Ammogrotis suavis Staudinger, 1895
- Amphipoea asiatica (Burrows, 1911)
- Amphipoea aslanbeki L Ronkay & Herczig, 1991
- Amphipoea bifurcata Gyulai & L. Ronkay, 1994
- Amphipoea burrowsi (Chapman, 1912)
- Amphipoea crinanensis (Burrows, 1908)
- Amphipoea fucosa (Freyer, 1830)
- Amphipoea lucens (Freyer, 1845)
- Amphipoea ochreola (Staudinger, 1882)
- Amphipoea oculea (Linnaeus, 1761)
- Amphipoea ussuriensis (Petersen, 1914)
- Amphipyra berbera Rungs, 1949
- Amphipyra erebina Butler, 1878
- Amphipyra jankowskii Oberthür, 1884
- Amphipyra livida ([Denis & Schiffermüller], 1775)
- Amphipyra molybdea Christoph, 1867
- Amphipyra perflua (Fabricius, 1787)
- Amphipyra pyramidea (Linnaeus, 1758)
- Amphipyra schrenkii Menetries, 1859
- Amphipyra sergei (Staudinger, 1888)
- Amphipyra tetra (Fabricius, 1787)
- Amphipyra tragopoginis (Clerck, 1759)
- Amyna axis Guenée, 1852
- Amyna punctum (Fabricius, 1794)
- Anacronicta caliginea (Butler, 1881)
- Anacronicta nitida (Butler, 1878)
- Anadevidia hebetata (Butler, 1889)
- Anadevidia peponis (Fabricius, 1775)
- Anapamea incerta (Staudinger, 1892)
- Anaplectoides prasina ([Denis & Schiffermüller], 1775)
- Anaplectoides virens (Butler, 1878)
- Anarta colletti (Sparre-Schneider, 1876)
- Anarta dianthi (Tauscher, 1809)
- Anarta farnhami (Grote, 1873)
- Anarta furca (Eversmann, 1852)
- Anarta hoplites (Staudinger, 1901)
- Anarta imperspicua Hacker, 1998
- Anarta latemarginata (Wiltshire, 1976)
- Anarta melanopa (Thunberg, 1791)
- Anarta mendax (Staudinger, 1879)
- Anarta militzae (I.Kozhantshikov, 1948)
- Anarta myrtilli (Linnaeus, 1761)
- Anarta nupponenorum Hacker & Fibiger, 2002
- Anarta odontites (Boisduval, 1829)
- Anarta schawyra (Bang-Haas, 1927)
- Anarta stigmosa (Christoph, 1887)
- Anarta trifolii (Hufnagel, 1766)
- Anatatha lignea (Butler, 1879)
- Anomis flava (Fabricius, 1775)
- Anomis involuta (Walker, [1858])
- Anomis leucolopha Prout, 1928
- Anomis mesogona (Walker, 1858)
- Anomis privata (Walker, 1865)
- Anorthoa angustipennis (Matsumura, 1926)
- Anorthoa munda ([Denis & Schiffermüller], 1775)
- Antarchaea conicephala (Staudinger, 1870)
- Anterastria atrata (Butler, 1881)
- Antha grata (Butler, 1881)
- Anthracia eriopoda (Herrich-Schäffer, 1851)
- Antitype chi (Linnaeus, 1758)
- Antivaleria viridimacula (Graeser, [1889])
- Antoculeora locuples (Oberthür, 1881)
- Anumeta atrosignata Walker, 1858
- Anumeta cestis (Menetries, 1849)
- Anumeta fractistrigata (Alphéraky, 1882)
- Anumeta henkei Staudinger, 1877
- Anumeta spilota Erschoff, 1874
- Apamea anceps ([Denis & Schiffermüller], 1775)
- Apamea aquila Donzel, 1837
- Apamea crenata (Hufnagel, 1766)
- Apamea epomidion (Haworth, 1809)
- Apamea exstincta (Staudinger, 1889)
- Apamea illyria Freyer, 1846
- Apamea leucodon (Eversmann, 1837)
- Apamea remissa (Hübner, [1809])
- Apamea scolopacina (Esper, 1788)
- Apamea sordens (Hufnagel, 1766)
- Apamea striata Haruta & Sugi, 1958
- Apamea unanimis (Hübner, [1813])
- Apaustis rupicola ([Denis & Schiffermüller], 1775)
- Apopestes indica Moore, 1883
- Apopestes noe L. Ronkay, 1990
- Aporophyla canescens (Duponchel, 1826)
- Aporophyla lutulenta ([Denis &. Schiffermüller], 1775)
- Aporophyla nigra (Haworth, 1809)
- Apterogenum ypsillon ([Denis & Schiffermüller], 1775)
- Araeopteron amoena Inoue, 1958
- Araeopteron fragmenta Inoue, 1965
- Archanara dissoluta (Treitschke, 1825)
- Archanara neurica (Hübner, [1808])
- Archanara phragmiticola (Staudinger, 1892)
- Archanara resoluta (Hampson, 1910)
- Arcte coerula (Guenée, 1852)
- Arenostola phragmitidis (Hübner, [1803])
- Argyrospila succinea (Esper, 1798)
- Ariolica argentea (Butler, 1881)
- Armada barrygoateri Fibiger, L. Ronkay & G. Ronkay, 2003
- Artena dotata (Fabricius, 1794)
- Arytrura musculus (Menetries, 1859)
- Arytrura subfalcata (Menetries, 1859)
- Asteropetes noctuina (Butler, 1878)
- Asteroscopus sphinx (Hufnagel, 1766)
- Asteroscopus syriaca (Warren, 1910)
- Atethmia ambusta ([Denis & Schiffermüller], 1775)
- Atethmia centrago (Haworth, 1809)
- Athaumasta expressa (Lederer, 1855)
- Athaumasta koreana L. Ronkay & Kononenko, 1998
- Athaumasta nana (Staudinger, 1896)
- Athaumasta siderigera (Christoph, 1893)
- Athaumasta splendida Bang-Haas, 1927
- Athetis albisignata (Oberthür, 1879)
- Athetis correpta (Pungeler, 1906)
- Athetis funesta (Staudinger, 1888)
- Athetis furvula (Hübner, [1808])
- Athetis gluteosa (Treitschke, 1835)
- Athetis hospes (Freyer, 1831)
- Athetis lapidea Wileman, 1911
- Athetis lepigone (Moschler, 1860)
- Athetis lineosa (Moore, 1881)
- Athetis pallidipennis Sugi, 1982
- Athetis pallustris (Hübner, [1808])
- Atrachea alpherakyi Kononenko, 1986
- Atrachea jankowskii (Oberthür, 1879)
- Atrachea japonica (Leech, 1889)
- Atrachea nitens (Butler, 1878)
- Atrachea parvispina (Tschetverikov, 1904)
- Atuntsea kogii (Sugi, 1977)
- Atypha pulmonaris (Esper, 1790)
- Auchmis curva (Staudinger, 1889)
- Auchmis detersa (Esper, 1787)
- Auchmis mongolica (Staudinger, 1896)
- Auchmis peterseni (Christoph, 1887)
- Auchmis saga (Butler, 1878)
- Autographa aemula ([Denis & Schiffermüller], 1775)
- Autographa amurica (Staudinger, 1892)
- Autographa bractea ([Denis & Schiffermüller], 1775)
- Autographa buraetica (Staudinger, 1892)
- Autographa camptosema (Hampson, 1913)
- Autographa excelsa (Kretschmar, 1862)
- Autographa gamma (Linnaeus, 1758)
- Autographa jota (Linnaeus, 1758)
- Autographa lehri Kljutschko, 1984
- Autographa macrogamma (Eversmann, 1842)
- Autographa mandarina (Freyer, 1845)
- Autographa nekrasovi Kljutschko, 1985
- Autographa nigrisigna (Walker, 1858)
- Autographa pulchrina (Haworth, 1809)
- Autographa ternei Kljutschko, 1984
- Autographa urupina (Bryk, 1942)
- Autographa v-minus (Oberthür, 1884)
- Autophila asiatica (Staudinger, 1888)
- Autophila chamaephanes Boursin, 1940
- Autophila glebicolor (Erschoff, 1874)
- Autophila hirsuta (Staudinger, 1870)
- Autophila inconspicua (Butler, 1881)
- Autophila libanotica (Staudinger, 1901)
- Autophila ligaminosa (Eversmann, 1851)
- Autophila limbata (Staudinger, 1871)
- Autophila luxuriosa Zerny, 1933
- Aventiola pusilla (Butler, 1879)
- Axylia putris (Linnaeus, 1761)
- Balsa leodura (Staudinger, 1887)
- Bastilla arctotaenia (Guenée, 1852)
- Bastilla maturata (Walker, 1858)
- Behounekia freyeri (Frivaldszky, 1835)
- Belciades niveola (Motschulsky, 1866)
- Belciana siitanae (Remm, 1983)
- Bena bicolorana (Fuessly, 1775)
- Bertula bistrigata (Staudinger, 1888)
- Blasticorhinus ussuriensis (Bremer, 1861)
- Blepharita amica (Treitschke, 1825)
- Brachionycha nubeculosa (Esper, 1785)
- Brachionycha sajana Draudt, 1934
- Brachylomia uralensis (Warren, 1910)
- Brachylomia viminalis (Fabricius, 1777)
- Brachyxanthia zelotypa (Lederer, 1853)
- Bryoleuca albimixta (Sugi, 1980)
- Bryoleuca granitalis (Butler, 1881)
- Bryoleuca orthogramma Boursin, 1954
- Bryomoia melachlora (Staudinger, 1892)
- Bryophilina mollicula (Graeser, [1889])
- Calamia staudingeri Wamecke, 1941
- Calamia tridens (Hufnagel, 1766)
- Calliergis ramosula (Staudinger, 1888)
- Callistege fortalitium (Tauscher, 1809)
- Callistege mi (Clerck, 1759)
- Callopistria albolineola (Graeser, [1889])
- Callopistria argyrosticta (Butler, 1881)
- Callopistria juventina (Stoll, 1782)
- Callopistria latreillei (Duponchel, 1827)
- Callopistria repleta Walker, 1858
- Calophasia lunula (Hufnage1, 1766)
- Calophasia opalina (Esper, 1793)
- Calymma communimacula ([Denis & Schiffermüller], 1775)
- Calyptra hokkaida (Wileman, 1922)
- Calyptra lata (Butler, 1881)
- Calyptra thalictri (Borkhausen, 1790)
- Camptoloma interiorata (Walker, [1865])
- Capsula aerata (Butler, 1878)
- Capsula algae (Esper, 1789)
- Capsula sparganii (Esper, 1790)
- Caradrina albina Eversmann, 1848
- Caradrina aspersa Rambur, 1834
- Caradrina clara Schawerda, 1928
- Caradrina clavipalpis (Scopoli, 1763)
- Caradrina expansa Alphéraky, 1887
- Caradrina fergana Staudinger, [1892]
- Caradrina flava Oberthür, 1876
- Caradrina fulvafusca Hacker, 2004
- Caradrina hypostigma (Boursin, 1932)
- Caradrina inumbrata (Staudinger, 1900)
- Caradrina kadenii Freyer, 1836
- Caradrina montana Bremer, 1861
- Caradrina morosa Lederer, 1853
- Caradrina morpheus (Hufnagel, 1766)
- Caradrina muricolor (Boursin, 1933)
- Caradrina pertinax Staudinger, 1879
- Caradrina petraea Tengstrom, 1869
- Caradrina selimpides (Bellier, 1863)
- Caradrina selini Boisduval, 1840
- Caradrina sogdiana (Boursin, 1936)
- Caradrina terrea Freyer, 1840
- Caradrina vicina Staudinger, 1870
- Caradrina wullschlegeli Pungeler, 1903
- Caradrina zernyi (Boursin, 1939)
- Cardepia helix (Boursin, 1962)
- Cardepia irrisoria (Erschoff, 1874)
- Catephia alchymista ([Denis & Schiffermüller], 1775)
- Catocala abamita Bremer & Grey, 1853
- Catocala actaea R.Felder & Rogenhofer, 1874
- Catocala adultera Menetries, 1856
- Catocala agitatrix Graeser, [1889]
- Catocala bella Butler, 1877
- Catocala bokhaica (Kononenko, 1979)
- Catocala columbina Leech, 1900
- Catocala conversa (Esper, 1783)
- Catocala danilovi (Bang-Haas, 1927)
- Catocala deducta Eversmann, 1843
- Catocala detrita Warren, 1913
- Catocala deuteronympha Staudinger, 1861
- Catocala dilecta (Hübner, [1808])
- Catocala dissimilis Bremer, 1861
- Catocala doerriesi Staudinger, 1888
- Catocala dula Bremer, 1861
- Catocala electa (Vieweg, 1790)
- Catocala ella Butler, 1877
- Catocala elocata (Esper, 1787)
- Catocala eminens Staudinger, 1892
- Catocala fraxini (Linnaeus, 1758)
- Catocala fulminea (Scopoli, 1763)
- Catocala helena Eversmann, 1856
- Catocala hymenaea ([Denis & Schiffermüller], 1775)
- Catocala koreana Staudinger, 1892
- Catocala kotschubeji Sheljuzhko, 1925
- Catocala lara Bremer, 1861
- Catocala lupina Herrich-Schäffer, 1851
- Catocala moltrechti (Bang-Haas, 1927)
- Catocala musmi (Hampson, 1913)
- Catocala nagioides Wileman, 1924
- Catocala neonympha (Esper, 1805)
- Catocala nivea Butler, 1877
- Catocala nubila Butler, 1881
- Catocala nupta (Linnaeus, 1767)
- Catocala nymphaeoides Herrich-Schäffer, 1845
- Catocala obscena Alphéraky, 1879
- Catocala orientalis Staudinger, 1877
- Catocala pacta (Linnaeus, 1758)
- Catocala pirata (Herz, 1904)
- Catocala praegnax Walker, 1858
- Catocala promissa ([Denis & Schiffermüller], 1775)
- Catocala proxeneta Alphéraky, 1895
- Catocala puerpera (Giorna, 1791)
- Catocala separans Leech, 1889
- Catocala sponsa (Linnaeus, 1767)
- Catocala streckeri Staudinger, 1888
- Celaena haworthii (Curtis, 1829)
- Ceramica pisi (Linnaeus, 1758)
- Cerapteryx graminis (Linnaeus, 1758)
- Cerapteryx megala Alphéraky, 1882
- Cerastis leucographa ([Denis & Schiffermüller], 1775)
- Cerastis orientalis Boursin, 1948
- Cerastis pallescens (Butler, 1878)
- Cerastis rubricosa ([Denis & Schiffermüller], 1775)
- Cervyna cervago (Eversmann, 1844)
- Chandata bella (Butler, 1881)
- Charanyca trigrammica (Hufnagel, 1766)
- Chasminodes aino Sugi, 1956
- Chasminodes albonitens (Bremer, 1861)
- Chasminodes atrata (Butler, 1884)
- Chasminodes bremeri Sugi & Kononenko, 1981
- Chasminodes cilia (Staudinger, 1888)
- Chasminodes nervosa (Butler, 1881)
- Chasminodes pseudalbonitens Sugi, 1955
- Chasminodes sugii Kononenko, 1981
- Chasminodes ussurica Kononenko, 1982
- Chersotis alpestris (Boisduval, 1837)
- Chersotis anatolica (Draudt, 1936)
- Chersotis andereggii (Boisduval, 1832)
- Chersotis capnistis (Lederer, 1872)
- Chersotis cuprea ([Denis & Schiffermüller], 1775)
- Chersotis deplanata (Eversmann, 1843)
- Chersotis elegans (Eversmann, 1837)
- Chersotis fimbriola (Esper, 1803)
- Chersotis juncta (Grote, 1878)
- Chersotis laeta (Rebel, 1904)
- Chersotis larixia (Guenée, 1852)
- Chersotis margaritacea (De Villers, 1789)
- Chersotis multangula (Hübner, [1803])
- Chersotis rectangula ([Denis & Schiffermüller], 1775)
- Chersotis semna (Pungeler, 1906)
- Chersotis stridula (Hampson, 1903)
- Chersotis transiens (Staudinger, 1897)
- Chilodes distracta (Eversmann, 1848)
- Chilodes maritima (Tauscher, 1806)
- Chilodes repeteki L. Ronkay, Varga & Hreblay, 1998
- Chloantha hyperici ([Denis & Schiffermüller], 1775)
- Chrysodeixis chalcites (Esper, 1789)
- Chrysorithrum amata (Bremer & Grey, 1853)
- Chrysorithrum flavomaculata (Bremer, 1861)
- Chytonix albonotata (Staudinger, 1892)
- Chytonix subalbonotata Sugi, 1959
- Cirrhia fasciata Kononenko, 1978
- Cirrhia fulvago (Clerck, 1759)
- Cirrhia gilvago ([Denis & Schiffermüller], 1775)
- Cirrhia icteritia (Hufnagel, 1766)
- Cirrhia ocellaris (Borkhausen, 1792)
- Cirrhia tunicata (Graeser, [1890])
- Clavipalpula aurariae (Oberthür, 1880)
- Cleoceris scoriacea (Esper, 1789)
- Cleonymia baetica (Rambur, 1837)
- Clytie delunaris (Staudinger, 1889)
- Clytie distincta (Bang-Haas, 1907)
- Clytie gracilis (Bang-Haas, 1907)
- Clytie terrulenta (Christoph, 1893)
- Coenagria nana (Staudinger, 1892)
- Coenobia orientalis Sugi, 1982
- Coenobia rufa (Haworth, 1809)
- Coenophila subrosea (Stephens, 1829)
- Colobochyla salicalis ([Denis & Schiffermüller], 1775)
- Colocasia coryli (Linnaeus, 1758)
- Colocasia mus (Oberthilr, 1884)
- Condica illecta (Walker, 1865)
- Condica illustrata (Staudinger, 1888)
- Conisania arida (Lederer, 1855)
- Conisania arterialis (Draudt, 1936)
- Conisania capsivora (Draudt, 1933)
- Conisania cervina (Eversmann, 1842)
- Conisania leineri (Freyer, 1836)
- Conisania literata (Fischer von Waldheim, 1840)
- Conisania luteago ([Denis & Schiffermüller], 1775)
- Conisania poelli Stertz, 1915
- Conisania suaveola (Draudt, 1950)
- Conisania suavis (Staudinger, 1892)
- Conistra albipuncta (Leech, 1889)
- Conistra ardescens (Butler, 1879)
- Conistra castaneofasciata (Motschulsky, [1861])
- Conistra erythrocephala ([Denis & Schiffermiller], 1775)
- Conistra filipjevi Kononenko, 1978
- Conistra fletcheri Sugi, 1958
- Conistra grisescens Draudt, 1950
- Conistra ligula (Esper, 1791)
- Conistra rubiginea ([Denis & Schiffermüller], 1775)
- Conistra rubiginosa (Scopoli, 1763)
- Conistra vaccinii (Linnaeus, 1761)
- Conistra veronicae (Hübner, [1813])
- Coranarta carbonaria (Christoph, 1893)
- Coranarta cordigera (Thunberg, 1788)
- Corgatha costimacula (Staudinger, 1892)
- Corgatha obsoleta Marumo, 1932
- Cornutifera simplex (Staudinger, 1889)
- Cornutiplusia circumflexa (Linnaeus, 1767)
- Cosmia affinis (Linnaeus, 1767)
- Cosmia camptostigma (Menetries, 1859)
- Cosmia cara (Butler, 1881)
- Cosmia diffinis (Linnaeus, 1767)
- Cosmia inconspicua (Draudt, 1950)
- Cosmia moderata (Staudinger, 1888)
- Cosmia pyralina ([Denis & Schiffermüller], 1775)
- Cosmia restituta Walker, 1857
- Cosmia trapezina (Linnaeus, 1758)
- Cosmia trapezinula (Filipjev, 1927)
- Cosmia unicolor (Staudinger, 1892)
- Cranionycta albonigra (Herz, 1904)
- Cranionycta jankowskii (Oberthiir, 1880)
- Cranionycta oda de Lattin, 1949
- Craniophora ligustri ([Denis & Schiffermüller], 1775)
- Craniophora pacifica Filipjev, 1927
- Craniophora pontica (Staudinger, 1879)
- Craniophora praeclara (Graeser, 1890)
- Cryphia algae (Fabricius, 1775)
- Cryphia amasina (Draudt, 1931)
- Cryphia bryophasma (Boursin, 1951)
- Cryphia domestica (Hufnagel, 1766)
- Cryphia duskei (Christoph, 1893)
- Cryphia fraudatricula (Hübner, [1803])
- Cryphia griseola (Nagano, 1918)
- Cryphia mediofusca (Sugi, 1959)
- Cryphia muralis (Forster, 1771)
- Cryphia ochsi Boursin, 1941
- Cryphia petricolor (Lederer, 1870)
- Cryphia protecta (Draudt, 1931)
- Cryphia raptricula ([Denis & Schiffermüller], 1775)
- Cryphia receptricula (Hübner, [1803])
- Cryphia rectilinea (Warren, 1909)
- Cryphia seladona (Christoph, 1885)
- Cryphia sugitanii Boursin, 1961
- Cryphia uzahovi L. Ronkay & Herczig, 1991
- Crypsedra gemmea (Treitschke, 1825)
- Cryptocala chardinyi (Boisduval, 1829)
- Ctenoceratoda brassicina (Draudt, 1934)
- Ctenoceratoda peregovitsi Varga & Gyulai, 1999
- Ctenoplusia agnata (Staudinger, 1892)
- Ctenoplusia albostriata (Bremer & Grey, 1853)
- Ctenostola sparganoiaes (O.Bang-Haas, 1927)
- Cucullia absinthii (Linnaeus, 1761)
- Cucullia amota Alphéraky, 1887
- Cucullia argentea (Hufnagel, 1766)
- Cucullia argentina (Fabricius, 1787)
- Cucullia artemisiae (Hufnagel, 1766)
- Cucullia asteris ([Denis & Schiffermüller], 1775)
- Cucullia balsamitae Boisduval, 1840
- Cucullia behouneki Hacker & L. Ronkay, 1988
- Cucullia biornata Fischer von Waldheim, 1840
- Cucullia biradiata W. Kozhantschikov, 1925
- Cucullia blattariae (Esper, 1790)
- Cucullia boryphora (Fischer von Waldheim, 1840)
- Cucullia campanulae Freyer, 1831
- Cucullia chamomillae ([Denis & Schiffermüller], 1775)
- Cucullia cineracea Freyer, 1841
- Cucullia dimorpha Staudinger, 1897
- Cucullia distinguenda Staudinger, 1892
- Cucullia dracunculi (Hübner,[1813])
- Cucullia duplicata Staudinger, 1882
- Cucullia elongata Butler, 1880
- Cucullia erythrocephala (Wagner, 1914)
- Cucullia formosa Rogenhofer, 1860
- Cucullia fraterna Butler, 1878
- Cucullia fraudatrix Eversmann, 1837
- Cucullia fuchsiana Eversmann, 1842
- Cucullia gnaphalii (Hübner, [1813])
- Cucullia gozmanyi G. Ronkay & L. Ronkay, 1994
- Cucullia hostilis Boursin, 1934
- Cucullia humilis Boursin, 1941
- Cucullia inderiensis Herrich-Schäffer, 1856
- Cucullia jankowskii Oberthür, 1884
- Cucullia kurilullia Bryk, 1942
- Cucullia lactea (Fabricius, 1787)
- Cucullia lactucae ([Denis & Schiffermüller], 1775)
- Cucullia ledereri Staudinger, 1892
- Cucullia lindei Heyne, 1899
- Cucullia lucifuga ([Denis & Schiffermüller], 1775)
- Cucullia lychnitis (Rambur, 1833)
- Cucullia maculosa Staudinger, 1888
- Cucullia magnifica Freyer, 1839
- Cucullia mandschuriae Oberthür, 1884
- Cucullia mixta Freyer, 1841
- Cucullia naruenensis Staudinger, 1879
- Cucullia papoka G. Ronkay & L. Ronkay, 1986
- Cucullia perforata Bremer, 1861
- Cucullia praecana Eversmann, 1843
- Cucullia prenanthis (Boisduva1, 1840)
- Cucullia propinqua Eversmann, 1842
- Cucullia sabulosa Staudinger, 1879
- Cucullia santonici (Hübner, [1813])
- Cucullia scopariae Dorfmeister, 1853
- Cucullia scoparioides Boursin, 1941
- Cucullia scrophulariae ([Denis & Schiffermüller], 1775)
- Cucullia spectabilisoides Poole, 1989
- Cucullia splendida (Cramer, 1777)
- Cucullia strigicosta Boursin, 1940
- Cucullia tanaceti ([Denis & Schiffermüller], 1775)
- Cucullia thapsiphaga (Treitschke, 1826)
- Cucullia tiefi Tshetverikov, 1956
- Cucullia tristis Boursin, 1934
- Cucullia umbratica (Linnaeus, 1758)
- Cucullia verbasci (Linnaeus, 1758)
- Cucullia virgaureae Boisduva1, 1840
- Cucullia xeranthemi Boisduva1, 1840
- Cymatophoropsis trimaculata (Bremer, 1861)
- Cymatophoropsis unca (Houlbert, 1921)
- Cyrebia anachoreta (Herrich-Schäffer, 1851)
- Cyrebia luperinoides (Guenée, 1852)
- Daddala lucilla (Butler, 1881)
- Dasypolia fani Staudinger, 1892
- Dasypolia lama Staudinger, 1896
- Dasypolia murina (Menetries, 1848)
- Dasypolia templi (Thunberg, 1792)
- Dasypolia timoi Fibiger & Nupponen, 2006
- Dasypolia tuektiensis Zolotarenko, 1993
- Deltote bankiana (Fabricius, 1775)
- Deltote deceptoria (Scopoli, 1763)
- Deltote delicatula (Christoph, 1882)
- Deltote nemorum (Oberthilr, 1880)
- Deltote uncula (Clerck, 1759)
- Denticucullus pygmina (Haworth, 1809)
- Diachrysia bieti (Oberthiir, 1884)
- Diachrysia chrysitis (Linnaeus, 1758)
- Diachrysia chryson (Esper, 1789)
- Diachrysia coreae (Inoue & Sugi, 1958)
- Diachrysia generosa (Staudinger, 1900)
- Diachrysia leonina (Oberthür, 1884)
- Diachrysia nadeja (Oberthür, 1880)
- Diachrysia stenochrysis (Warren, 1913)
- Diachrysia zosimi (Hübner, [1822])
- Diarsia brunnea ([Denis & Schiffermüller], 1775)
- Diarsia canescens (Butler, 1878)
- Diarsia dahlii (Hübner, [1813])
- Diarsia deparca (Butler, 1879)
- Diarsia dewitzi (Graeser, [1889])
- Diarsia florida (F.Schmidt, 1859)
- Diarsia mediotincta I.Kozhantshikov, 1937
- Diarsia mendica (Fabricius, 1775)
- Diarsia nipponica Ogata, 1957
- Diarsia rubi (Vieweg, 1790)
- Diarsia ruficauda (Warren, 1909)
- Dichagyris achtalensis (I.Kozhantshikov, 1929)
- Dichagyris amoena (Staudinger, 1892)
- Dichagyris candelisequa (Denis & Schiffermullter, 1775)
- Dichagyris caucasica (Staudinger, 1877)
- Dichagyris celebrata (Alphéraky, 1897)
- Dichagyris celsicola (Bellier, 1859)
- Dichagyris duskei Moberg & Fibiger, 1990
- Dichagyris eremicola (Standfuss, 1888)
- Dichagyris eureteocles Boursin, 1940
- Dichagyris flammatra (Denis & Schiffermullter, 1775)
- Dichagyris flavina (Herrich-Schäffer, 1852)
- Dichagyris forcipula (Denis & Schiffermullter, 1775)
- Dichagyris forficula (Eversmann, 1851)
- Dichagyris ignara (Staudinger, 1896)
- Dichagyris inexpectata (W. Kozhantschikov, 1925)
- Dichagyris iranicola Kodak, 1997
- Dichagyris leucomelas (Brandt, 1941)
- Dichagyris lutescens (Eversmann, 1844)
- Dichagyris lux Fibiger & Nupponen, 2002
- Dichagyris multicuspis (Eversmann, 1852)
- Dichagyris musiva (Hübner, 1803)
- Dichagyris nigrescens (Hofner, 1888)
- Dichagyris orientis (Alphéraky, 1882)
- Dichagyris petersi (Christoph, 1887)
- Dichagyris plumbea (Alphéraky, 1887)
- Dichagyris pudica (Staudinger, 1896)
- Dichagyris renigera (Hübner, [1808])
- Dichagyris signifera ([Denis & Schiffermüller], 1775)
- Dichagyris spissilinea (Staudinger, 1897)
- Dichagyris squalidior (Staudinger, 1901)
- Dichagyris squalorum (Eversmann, 1856)
- Dichagyris stentzi (Lederer, 1853)
- Dichagyris terminicincta (Corti, 1933)
- Dichagyris triangularis (Moore, 1867)
- Dichagyris truculenta (Lederer, 1853)
- Dichagyris tyrannus (Bang-Haas, 1912)
- Dichagyris vallesiaca (Boisduval, 1837)
- Dichonia aeruginea (Hübner, [1808])
- Dichonia convergens ([Denis & Schiffermüller], 1775)
- Dicycla oo (Linnaeus, 1758)
- Diloba caeruleocephala (Linnaeus, 1758)
- Dimorphicosmia variegata (Oberthür, 1879)
- Diomea cremata (Butler, 1878)
- Diomea jankowskii (Oberthiir, 1880)
- Dioszeghyana mirabilis (Sugi, 1955)
- Divaena haywardi (Tams, 1926)
- Doerriesa striata Staudinger, 1900
- Drasteria cailino (Lefebvre, 1827)
- Drasteria catocalis (Staudinger, 1882)
- Drasteria caucasica (Kolenati, 1846)
- Drasteria flexuosa (Menetries, 1848)
- Drasteria herzi (Alphéraky, 1892)
- Drasteria mongoliensis Wiltshire, 1969
- Drasteria picta (Christoph, 1877)
- Drasteria pulverosa Wiltshire, 1969
- Drasteria rada (Boisduval, 1848)
- Drasteria saisani (Staudinger, 1882)
- Drasteria scolopax (Alphéraky, 1892)
- Drasteria sesquistria (Eversmann, 1854)
- Drasteria tenera (Staudinger, 1877)
- Dryobotodes carbonis (Wagner, 1931)
- Dryobotodes eremita (Fabricius, 1775)
- Dryobotodes pryeri (Leech, 1900)
- Dypterygia andreji Kardakoff, 1928
- Dypterygia caliginosa (Walker, 1858)
- Dypterygia scabriuscula (Linnaeus, 1758)
- Dysgonia algira (Linnaeus, 1767)
- Dysgonia coreana (Leech, 1889)
- Dysgonia dulcis (Butler, 1878)
- Dysgonia mandschuriana (Staudinger, 1892)
- Dysgonia obscura (Bremer & Grey, 1853)
- Dysgonia rogenhoferi (Bohatsch, 1880)
- Dysgonia stuposa (Fabricius, 1794)
- Dysmilichia gemella (Leech, 1889)
- Earias clorana (Linnaeus, 1761)
- Earias pudicana Staudinger, 1887
- Earias rjabovi Filipjev, 1933
- Earias roseifera Butler, 1881
- Earias roseoviridis Sugi, 1982
- Earias vernana (Fabricius, 1787)
- Edessena hamada (R.Felder & Rogenhofer, 1874)
- Egira anatolica (Hering, 1933)
- Egira conspicillaris (Linnaeus, 1758)
- Elaphria venustula (Hübner, 1790)
- Eligma narcissus (Cramer, 1775)
- Enargia abluta (Hübner, [1808])
- Enargia paleacea (Esper, 1788)
- Enispa albosignata (Staudinger, 1892)
- Enispa bimaculata (Staudinger, 1892)
- Enispa lutefascialis (Leech, 1889)
- Enterpia laudeti (Boisduval, 1840)
- Enterpia picturata (Alphéraky, 1882)
- Eogena contaminei (Eversmann, 1847)
- Epilecta linogrisea ([Denis & Schiffermüller], 1775)
- Epimecia ustula (Freyer, 1835)
- Epipsilia grisescens (Fabricius, 1794)
- Epipsilia latens (Hübner, [1809])
- Episema glaucina (Esper, 1789)
- Episema korsakovi (Christoph, 1885)
- Episema lederi Christoph, 1&85
- Episema tersa ([Denis & Schiffermüller], 1775)
- Erastroides fentoni (Butler, 1881)
- Erebus macrops (Linnaeus, 1758)
- Eremobia ochroleuca ([Denis & Schiffermüller], 1775)
- Erythroplusia pyropia (Butler, 1879)
- Erythroplusia rutilifrons (Walker, 1858)
- Estimata alexii W. Kozhantschikov, 1928
- Estimata herrichschaefferi (Alphéraky, 1895)
- Estimata militzae (I.Kozhantshikov, 1947)
- Estimata oschi (О. Bang-Haas, 1922)
- Eublemma amasina (Eversmann, 1842)
- Eublemma amoena (Hübner, [1803])
- Eublemma debilis (Christoph, 1884)
- Eublemma gratissima (Staudinger, 1892)
- Eublemma minutata (Fabricius, 1794)
- Eublemma ostrina (Hübner, 1790)
- Eublemma pallidula (Herrich-Schäffer, 1856)
- Eublemma panonica (Freyer, 1840)
- Eublemma parallela (Freyer, 1842)
- Eublemma parva (Hübner, [1808])
- Eublemma polygramma (Duponchel, 1842)
- Eublemma porphyrinia (Freyer, 1845)
- Eublemma pudorina (Staudinger, 1889)
- Eublemma pulchralis (De Villers, 1789)
- Eublemma purpurina ([Denis & Schiffermüller], 1775)
- Eublemma pusilla (Eversmann, 1834)
- Eublemma rosea (Hübner, 1790)
- Eucarta amethystina (Hübner, [1803])
- Eucarta arcta (Lederer, 1853)
- Eucarta arctides (Staudinger, 1888)
- Eucarta fasciata (Butler, 1878)
- Eucarta virgo (Treitschke, 1835)
- Euchalcia altaica Dufay, 1968
- Euchalcia armeniae Dufay, 1966
- Euchalcia biezankoi (Alberti, 1965)
- Euchalcia consona (Fabricius, 1787)
- Euchalcia cuprescens Dufay, 1966
- Euchalcia modestoides Poole, 1989
- Euchalcia renardi (Eversmann, 1844)
- Euchalcia sergia (Oberthür, 1884)
- Euchalcia siderifera (Eversmann, 1846)
- Euchalcia variabilis (Piller, 1783)
- Euclidia dentata Staudinger, 1871
- Euclidia glyphica (Linnaeus, 1758)
- Eudocima falonia (Linnaeus, 1763)
- Eudocima tyrannus (Guenée, 1852)
- Eugnorisma chaldaica (Boisduval, 1840)
- Eugnorisma depuncta (Linnaeus, 1761)
- Eugnorisma eminens (Lederer, 1855)
- Eugnorisma ignoratum Varga & L. Ronkay, 1994
- Eugnorisma insignata (Lederer, 1853)
- Eugnorisma miniago (Freyer, 1839)
- Eugnorisma puengeleri Varga & L. Ronkay, 1987
- Eugnorisma trigonica (Alphéraky, 1882)
- Eugraphe senescens (Staudinger, 1881)
- Eugraphe sigma ([Denis & Schiffermüller], 1775)
- Eugraphe versuta (Pungeler, 1908)
- Euplexia koreaeplexia Bryk, 1948
- Euplexia lucipara (Linnaeus, 1758)
- Eupsilia boursini Sugi, 1958
- Eupsilia contracta (Butler, 1878)
- Eupsilia kurenzovi Kononenko, 1976
- Eupsilia transversa (Hufnagel, 1766)
- Eurois occulta (Linnaeus, 1758)
- Euromoia mixta Staudinger, 1892
- Euromoia subpulchra (Alphéraky, 1897)
- Eutelia adoratrix (Staudinger, 1892)
- Eutelia adulatricoides (Mell, 1943)
- Eutelia adulatrix (Hübner, [1813])
- Eutelia geyeri (R.Felder & Rogenhofer, 1874)
- Euxoa acuminifera (Eversmann, 1854)
- Euxoa adumbrata (Eversmann, 1842)
- Euxoa anatolica Draudt, 1936
- Euxoa aquilina ([Denis & Schiffermüller], 1775)
- Euxoa basigramma (Staudinger, 1870)
- Euxoa birivia ([Denis & Schiffermüller], 1775)
- Euxoa centralis (Staudinger, 1889)
- Euxoa christophi (Staudinger, 1870)
- Euxoa churchillensis McDunnough, 1932
- Euxoa conifera (Christoph, 1877)
- Euxoa conspicua (Hübner,[1824])
- Euxoa cos (Hübner, [1824])
- Euxoa cursoria (Hufnagel, 1766)
- Euxoa decora ([Denis & Schiffermüller], 1775)
- Euxoa decorans (Staudinger, 1896)
- Euxoa deficiens (Wagner, 1913)
- Euxoa deserta (Staudinger, 1870)
- Euxoa diaphora Boursin, 1928
- Euxoa distinguenda (Lederer, 1857)
- Euxoa dsheiron Brandt, 1938
- Euxoa emolliens Warren, 1909
- Euxoa eruta (Hübner, [1827])
- Euxoa fallax (Eversmann, 1854)
- Euxoa filipjevi I.Kozhantshikov, 1929
- Euxoa fissa Staudinger, 1895
- Euxoa foeda (Lederer, 1855)
- Euxoa glabella Wagner, 1930
- Euxoa goetria I.Kozhantshikov, 1929
- Euxoa hastifera (Donzel, 1847)
- Euxoa heringi (Staudinger, 1877)
- Euxoa hilaris (Freyer, 1838)
- Euxoa hyperborea Lafontaine, 1987
- Euxoa intolerabilis (Pungeler, 1902)
- Euxoa karschi (Graeser, [1890])
- Euxoa mustelina (Christoph, 1877)
- Euxoa nigricans (Linnaeus, 1761)
- Euxoa nigrofusca (Esper,[1788])
- Euxoa novoobscurior Bryk, 1948
- Euxoa obelisca ([Denis & Schiffermüller], 1775)
- Euxoa ochrogaster (Guenée, 1852)
- Euxoa phantoma I.Kozhantshikov, 1928
- Euxoa recussa (Hübner, [1817])
- Euxoa sabuletorum (Boisduval, 1840)
- Euxoa segnilis (Duponchel, 1836)
- Euxoa sibirica (Boisduval, 1832)
- Euxoa temera (Hübner, [1808])
- Euxoa triaena I.Kozhantshikov, 1929
- Euxoa tristis (Staudinger, 1897)
- Euxoa tritici (Linnaeus, 1761)
- Euxoa vitta (Esper, 1789)
- Euxoa zernyi Boursin, 1944
- Evonima mandschuriana (Oberthür, 1880)
- Exophyla rectangularis (Geyer, [1828])
- Fabula zollikoferi (Freyer, 1836)
- Feltia arctica (Kononenko, 1981)
- Feltia beringiana Lafontaine, Kononenko & McCabe, 1986
- Feltia boreana Lafontaine, 1986
- Feltia honesta (Staudinger, 1892)
- Feltia nigrita (Graeser, 1892)
- Feralia sauberi (Graeser, 1892)
- Gelastocera eminentissima Bryk, 1948
- Gelastocera exusta Butler, 1877
- Gelastocera kotschbeji Obraztsov, 1943
- Gelastocera ochroleucana Staudinger, 1887
- Gelastocera sutschana Obraztsov, 1950
- Gerbathodes paupera (Staudinger, 1892)
- Gonepatica opalina (Butler, 1879)
- Gonospileia munita (Hübner, [1813])
- Gonospileia triquetra ([Denis & Schiffermüller], 1775)
- Gortyna basalipunctata Graeser, [1889]
- Gortyna borelii (Pierret, 1837)
- Gortyna flavago ([Denis & Schiffermüller], 1775)
- Gortyna fortis (Butler, 1878)
- Gortyna hethitica Hacker, Kuhna & Gross, 1986
- Grammodes bifasciata (Petagna, 1787)
- Grammodes stolida (Fabricius, 1775)
- Graphiphora augur (Fabricius, 1775)
- Griposia aprilina (Linnaeus, 1758)
- Griposia pinkeri (Kobes, 1973)
- Gynaephila maculifera Staudinger, 1892
- Gyrospilara formosa (Graeser, [1889])
- Hada persa (Alphéraky, 1897)
- Hada plebeja (Linnaeus, 1761)
- Hadena aberrans (Eversmann, 1856)
- Hadena albertii Hacker, 1996
- Hadena albimacula (Borkhausen, 1792)
- Hadena caesia ([Denis & Schiffermüller], 1775)
- Hadena capsincola ([Denis & Schiffermüller], 1775)
- Hadena christophi (Moschler, 1862)
- Hadena clara (Staudinger, 1901)
- Hadena compta ([Denis & Schiffermüller], 1775)
- Hadena confusa (Hufnagel, 1766)
- Hadena consparcatoides (Schawerda, 1928)
- Hadena corrupta (Herz, 1898)
- Hadena dianthoecioides (Boursin, 1940)
- Hadena drenowskii (Rebel, 1930)
- Hadena femina Hacker, 1996
- Hadena filograna (Esper, [1788])
- Hadena irregularis (Hufnagel, 1766)
- Hadena kurajica Hacker, 1996
- Hadena luteocincta (Rambur, 1834)
- Hadena magnolii (Boisduval, 1829)
- Hadena melanochroa (Staudinger, 1892)
- Hadena perplexa ([Denis & Schiffermüller], 1775)
- Hadena persimilis Hacker, 1996
- Hadena pseudodealbata Hacker, 1988
- Hadena pseudohyrcana de Freina & Hacker, 1985
- Hadena scythia Kljutschko & Hacker, 1996
- Hadena secreta Hacker, 1996
- Hadena silenes (Hübner, [1822])
- Hadena strouhali (Boursin, 1955)
- Hadena syriaca (Osthelder, 1933)
- Hadena tephroleuca (Boisduval, 1833)
- Hadena variolata (Smith, 1888)
- Hadennia incongruens (Butler, 1879)
- Haderonia optima (Alphéraky, 1897)
- Hadjina lutosa Staudinger, 1892
- Haemerosia vassilininei Bang-Haas, 1912
- Harutaeographa stenoptera (Staudinger, 1892)
- Hecatera accurata (Christoph, 1882)
- Hecatera bicolorata (Hufnagel, 1766)
- Hecatera cappa (Hübner, [1809])
- Hecatera dysodea ([Denis & Schiffermüller], 1775)
- Hedina deccerti (Hampson, 1908)
- Hedina decipiens (Alphéraky, 1895)
- Helicoverpa armigera (Hübner, [1808])
- Helicoverpa assulta (Guenée, 1852)
- Heliocheilus fervens (Butler, 1881)
- Heliothis incarnata (Fraser, 1838)
- Heliothis maritima Graslin, 1855
- Heliothis nubigera Herrich-Schäffer, 1851
- Heliothis ononis ([Denis & Schiffermüller], 1775)
- Heliothis peltigera ([Denis & Schiffermüller], 1775)
- Heliothis viriplaca (Hufnagel, 1766)
- Helotropha leucostigma (Hübner, [1808])
- Hepatica anceps Staudinger, 1892
- Heraema mandschurica Graeser, [1890]
- Herminia arenosa Butler, 1878
- Herminia dolosa Butler, 1879
- Herminia grisealis ([Denis & Schiffermüller], 1775)
- Herminia robiginosa (Staudinger, 1888)
- Herminia stramentacealis Bremer, 1864
- Herminia tarsicrinalis (Knoch, 1782)
- Hermonassa arenosa (Butler, 1881)
- Hermonassa cecilia Butler, 1878
- Hillia iris (Zetterstedt, 1839)
- Himalistra evelina (Butler, 1879)
- Holocryptis nymphula (Rebel, 1909)
- Holocryptis ussuriensis (Rebel, 1901)
- Hoplodrina ambigua ([Denis & Schiffermüller], 1775)
- Hoplodrina blanda ([Denis & Schiffermüller], 1775)
- Hoplodrina euryptera Boursin, 1937
- Hoplodrina octogenaria (Goeze, 1781)
- Hoplodrina pfeifferi (Boursin, 1932)
- Hoplodrina respersa ([Denis & Schiffermüller], 1775)
- Hoplodrina superstes (Ochsenheimer, 1816)
- Hyalobole albimacula (Kononenko, 1978)
- Hydraecia micacea (Esper, 1789)
- Hydraecia mongoliensis Urbahn, 1967
- Hydraecia nordstroemi Horke, 1952
- Hydraecia osseola Staudinger, 1882
- Hydraecia petasitis Doubleday, 1847
- Hydraecia praecipua Hacker & Nekrasov, 2001
- Hydraecia ultima Holst, 1965
- Hydrillodes morosa (Butler, 1879)
- Hypena amica Butler, 1878
- Hypena bicoloralis Graeser, [1889]
- Hypena bipartita Staudinger, 1892
- Hypena claripennis Butler, 1878
- Hypena conspersalis Staudinger, 1888
- Hypena crassalis (Fabricius, 1787)
- Hypena kengkalis Bremer, 1864
- Hypena munitalis Mann, 1861
- Hypena narratalis Walker, 1858
- Hypena nigrobasalis (Herz, 1904)
- Hypena obesalis Treitschke, 1829
- Hypena opulenta (Christoph, 1877)
- Hypena palpalis (Hübner, 1796)
- Hypena proboscidalis (Linnaeus, 1758)
- Hypena rostralis (Linnaeus, 1758)
- Hypena semialbata Sugi, 1982
- Hypena squalida (Butler, 1878)
- Hypena stygiana Butler, 1878
- Hypena tamsi Filipjev, 1927
- Hypena tatorhina Butler, 1878
- Hypena tristalis Lederer, 1853
- Hypena zilla Butler, 1879
- Hypenodes humidalis Doubleday, 1850
- Hypenodes orientalis Staudinger, 1901
- Hypenodes rectifascia Sugi, 1982
- Hyperstrotia flavipuncta (Leech, 1889)
- Hypersypnoides astrigera (Butler, 1885)
- Hypobarathra icterias (Eversmann, 1843)
- Hypocala deflorata (Fabricius, 1794)
- Hypocala subsatura Guenée, 1852
- Hypocala violacea Butler, 1879
- Hypocoena stigmatica (Eversmann, 1855)
- Hypostrotia cinerea (Butler, 1878)
- Hyppa rectilinea (Esper, 1788)
- Hyssia cavernosa (Eversmann, 1842)
- Idia calvaria ([Denis & Schiffermüller], 1775)
- Idia curvipalpis (Butler, 1879)
- Idia quadra (Graeser, [1889])
- Imosca coreana (Matsumura, 1926)
- Ipimorpha contusa (Freyer, 1849)
- Ipimorpha retusa (Linnaeus, 1761)
- Ipimorpha subtusa ([Denis & Schiffermüller], 1775)
- Iragaodes nobilis (Staudinger, 1887)
- Isochlora daghestana Hreblay & L Ronkay, 1998
- Isochlora grumi Alphéraky, 1892
- Isochlora herbacea Alphéraky, 1895
- Isochlora sericea (Lafontaine & Kononenko, 1996)
- Isochlora viridis Staudinger, 1882
- Jodia croceago ([Denis & Schiffermüller], 1775)
- Jodia sericea (Butler, 1878)
- Karana laetevirens (Oberthiir, 1884)
- Kerala decipiens (Butler, 1878)
- Koyaga falsa (Butler, 1885)
- Koyaga numisma (Staudinger, 1888)
- Lacanobia aliena (Hübner, [1808])
- Lacanobia blenna (Hübner, [1824])
- Lacanobia contigua ([Denis & Schiffermüller], 1775)
- Lacanobia contrastata (Bryk, 1942)
- Lacanobia dentata (Kononenko, 1981)
- Lacanobia mongolica Behounek, 1992
- Lacanobia oleracea (Linnaeus, 1758)
- Lacanobia praedita (Hübner, [1813])
- Lacanobia splendens (Hübner, [1808])
- Lacanobia suasa ([Denis & Schiffermüller], 1775)
- Lacanobia thalassina (Hufnagel, 1766)
- Lacanobia w-latinum (Hufnagel, 1766)
- Lamprotes c-aureum (Knoch, 1781)
- Lamprotes mikadina (Butler, 1878)
- Lasianobia lauta (Pungeler, 1900)
- Lasionycta alpicola Lafontaine & Kononenko, 1988
- Lasionycta buraetica Kononenko, 1988
- Lasionycta corax Kononenko, 1988
- Lasionycta draudti (Wagner, 1936)
- Lasionycta hampsoni Varga, 1974
- Lasionycta hospita Bang-Haas, 1912
- Lasionycta imbecilla (Fabricius, 1794)
- Lasionycta impar (Staudinger, 1870)
- Lasionycta leucocycla (Staudinger, 1857)
- Lasionycta orientalis (Alphéraky, 1882)
- Lasionycta proxima (Hübner, [1809])
- Lasionycta secedens (Walker, 1858)
- Lasionycta skraelingia (Herrich-Schäffer, 1852)
- Lasionycta staudingeri (Aurivillius, 1891)
- Laspeyria flexula ([Denis & Schiffermüller], 1775)
- Lateroligia ophiogramma (Esper, 1794)
- Lenisa geminipuncta (Haworth, 1809)
- Leucania comma (Linnaeus, 1761)
- Leucania herrichi Herrich-Schäffer, 1849
- Leucania loreyi (Duponchel, 1827)
- Leucania obsoleta (Hübner, 1803)
- Leucania punctosa (Treitschke, 1825)
- Leucania zeae (Duponchel, 1827)
- Leucapamea askoldis (Oberthür, 1880)
- Leucapamea kawadai (Sugi, 1955)
- Leucochlaena fallax (Staudinger, 1870)
- Leucochlaena muscosa (Staudinger, 1891)
- Leucomelas juvenilis (Bremer, 1861)
- Lithacodia martjanovi (Tschetverikov, 1904)
- Lithomoia solidaginis (Hübner, [1803])
- Lithophane consocia (Borkhausen, 1792)
- Lithophane furcifera (Hufnagel, 1766)
- Lithophane lamda (Fabricius, 1787)
- Lithophane lapidea (Hübner, [1808])
- Lithophane ornitopus (Hufnagel, 1766)
- Lithophane pacifica Kononenko, 1978
- Lithophane plumbealis (Matsumura, 1926)
- Lithophane pruinosa (Butler, 1878)
- Lithophane rosinae (Piingeler, 1906)
- Lithophane semibrunnea (Haworth, 1809)
- Lithophane socia (Hufnagel, 1766)
- Lithophane ustulata (Butler, 1878)
- Lithophane venusta (Leech, 1889)
- Litoligia fodinae (Oberthür, 1880)
- Litoligia literosa (Haworth, 1809)
- Longalatedes elymi (Treitschke, 1825)
- Lophomilia flaviplaga (Warren, 1912)
- Luperina diversa (Staudinger, 1892)
- Luperina rjabovi Kljutschko, 1967
- Luperina rubella (Duponchel, 1835)
- Luperina taurica (Kljutschko, 1967)
- Luperina testacea ([Denis & Schiffermüller], 1775)
- Lycophotia cissigma (Menetries, 1859)
- Lycophotia molothina (Esper, 1789)
- Lycophotia porphyrea ([Denis & Schiffermüller], 1775)
- Lygephila craccae ([Denis & Schiffermüller], 1775)
- Lygephila emaculata (Graeser, 1892)
- Lygephila lubrica (Freyer, 1842)
- Lygephila ludicra (Hübner, 1790)
- Lygephila lusoria (Linnaeus, 1758)
- Lygephila maxima (Bremer, 1861)
- Lygephila minima Pekarsky, 2013
- Lygephila mirabilis (Bryk, 1948)
- Lygephila nigricostata (Graeser, 1890)
- Lygephila pastinum (Treitschke, 1826)
- Lygephila procax (Hübner, [1813])
- Lygephila recta (Bremer, 1864)
- Lygephila viciae (Hilbner, [1822])
- Lygephila vulcanea (Butler, 1881)
- Macdunnoughia confusa (Stephens, 1850)
- Macdunnoughia crassisigna (Warren, 1913)
- Macdunnoughia hybrida L. Ronkay, 1986
- Macdunnoughia purissima (Butler, 1878)
- Macrochilo cribrumalis (Hübner, 1793)
- Macrochtonia fervens Butler, 1881
- Maliattha bella (Staudinger, 1888)
- Maliattha chalcogramma (Bryk, 1948)
- Maliattha khasanica Zolotarenko & Dubatolov, 1996
- Maliattha rosacea (Leech, 1889)
- Mamestra brassicae (Linnaeus, 1758)
- Megalodes eximia (Freyer, 1845)
- Meganephria bimaculosa (Linnaeus, 1767)
- Meganephria cinerea (Butler, 1881)
- Meganephria extensa (Butler, 1879)
- Meganephria kononenkoi Poole, 1989
- Meganephria parki L. Ronkay & Kononenko, 1998
- Meganephria tancrei (Graeser, [1889])
- Melanchra persicariae (Linnaeus, 1761)
- Melanchra postalba Sugi, 1982
- Melapia electaria (Bremer, 1864)
- Mesapamea concinnata Heinicke, 1959
- Mesapamea moderata (Eversmann, 1843)
- Mesapamea secalella Remm, 1983
- Mesapamea secalis (Linnaeus, 1758)
- Mesogona acetosellae ([Denis & Schiffermüller], 1775)
- Mesogona oxalina (Hübner, [1803])
- Mesoligia furuncula ([Denis & Schiffermüller], 1775)
- Mesotrosta signalis (Treitschke, 1829)
- Metachrostis obliquisigna Hampson, 1894
- Metoponrhis albirena (Christoph, 1887)
- Metopoplus boursini Brandt, 1938
- Metopoplus excelsa Christoph, 1885
- Metopta rectifasciata (Menetries, 1863)
- Micardia pulchra Butler, 1878
- Mimeusemia persimilis Butler, 1875
- Minucia lunaris ([Denis & Schiffermüller], 1775)
- Mniotype adusta (Esper, 1790)
- Mniotype bathensis (Lutzau, 1901)
- Mniotype japonica Draudt, 1935
- Mniotype melanodonta (Hampson, 1906)
- Mniotype satura ([Denis & Schiffermüller], 1775)
- Mocis ancilla (Warren, 1913)
- Mocis annetta (Butler, 1878)
- Mocis frugalis (Fabricius, 1775)
- Mocis undata (Fabricius, 1775)
- Moma alpium (Osbeck, 1778)
- Moma kolthoffi (Bryk, 1948)
- Moma tsushimana Sugi, 1982
- Mormo maura (Linnaeus, 1758)
- Mormo muscivirens Butler, 1878
- Mycteroplus puniceago (Boisduval, 1840)
- Mythimna albipuncta ([Denis & Schiffermüller], 1775)
- Mythimna albiradiosa (Eversmann, 1852)
- Mythimna alopecuri (Boisduval, 1840)
- Mythimna andereggii (Boisduval, 1840)
- Mythimna atrata Remm & Viidalep, 1979
- Mythimna chosenicola (Bryk, 1948)
- Mythimna congrua (Hübner, [1817])
- Mythimna conigera ([Denis & Schiffermüller], 1775)
- Mythimna curvata Leech, 1900
- Mythimna deserticola (Bartel, 1903)
- Mythimna divergens Butler, 1878
- Mythimna ferrago (Fabricius, 1787)
- Mythimna flavostigma (Bremer, 1861)
- Mythimna grandis Butler, 1878
- Mythimna impura (Hübner, [1808])
- Mythimna inanis (Oberthür, 1880)
- Mythimna l-album (Linnaeus, 1767)
- Mythimna monticola Sugi, 1958
- Mythimna opaca (Staudinger, 1900)
- Mythimna pallens (Linnaeus, 1758)
- Mythimna placida Butler, 1878
- Mythimna postica (Hampson, 1905)
- Mythimna pudorina ([Denis & Schiffermüller], 1775)
- Mythimna radiata (Bremer, 1861)
- Mythimna rufipennis Butler, 1878
- Mythimna sassanidica (Hacker, 1986)
- Mythimna separata (Walker, 1865)
- Mythimna simplex (Leech, 1889)
- Mythimna straminea (Treitschke, 1825)
- Mythimna turca (Linnaeus, 1761)
- Mythimna unipuncta (Haworth, 1809)
- Mythimna velutina (Eversmann, 1846)
- Mythimna vitellina (Hübner, 1808)
- Nacna malachitis (Oberthür, 1880)
- Naenia contaminata (Walker, 1865)
- Naenia typica (Linnaeus, 1758)
- Naganoella timandra (Alphéraky, 1897)
- Naranga aenescens Moore, 1881
- Negritothripa hampsoni (Wileman, 1911)
- Netrocerocora quadrangula (Eversmann, 1844)
- Neustrotia costimacula (Oberthür, 1880)
- Neustrotia noloides (Butler, 1879)
- Niphonyx segregata (Butler, 1878)
- Noctua comes Hübner, [1813]
- Noctua fimbriata (Schreber, 1759)
- Noctua interjecta Hübner, [1803]
- Noctua interposita (Hübner, 1790)
- Noctua janthe (Borkhausen, 1792)
- Noctua janthina ([Denis & Schiffermüller], 1775)
- Noctua orbona (Hufnagel, 1766)
- Noctua pronuba Linnaeus, 1758
- Nola aerugula (Hübner, 1793)
- Nola chlamitulalis (Hübner, [1813])
- Nola cicatricalis (Treitschke, 1835)
- Nola confusalis (Herrich-Schäffer, 1847)
- Nola costimacula Staudinger, 1887
- Nola crambiformis Rebel, 1902
- Nola cristatula (Hübner, 1793)
- Nola cucullatella (Linnaeus, 1758)
- Nola emi (Inoue, 1956)
- Nola innocua Butler, 1880
- Nola jjaponibia Strand, 1920
- Nola karelica (Tengstrom, 1869)
- Nola nami (Inoue, 1956)
- Nola neglecta Inoue, 1991
- Nola subchlamydula Staudinger, 1871
- Nola taeniata Snellen, 1875
- Nola turanica Staudinger, 1887
- Nolathripa lactaria (Graeser, 1892)
- Nonagria puengeleri (Schawerda, 1923)
- Nonagria typhae (Thunberg, 1784)
- Nycteola asiatica (Krulikowsky, 1904)
- Nycteola columbana (Turner, 1925)
- Nycteola degenerana (Hübner, 1799)
- Nycteola kuldzhana Obraztsov, 1954
- Nycteola revayana (Scopoli, 1772)
- Nycteola siculana (Fuchs, 1899)
- Nyssocnemis eversmanni (Lederer, 1853)
- Ochropleura plecta (Linnaeus, 1761)
- Odice arcuinna (Hübner, 1790)
- Oligia fasciuncula (Haworth, 1809)
- Oligia latruncula ([Denis & Schiffermüller], 1775)
- Oligia leuconephra Hampson, 1908
- Oligia pseudodubia Rezbanyai-Reser, 1997
- Oligia strigilis (Linnaeus, 1758)
- Oligia vandarban Rezbanyai-Reser, 1997
- Oligia versicolor (Borkhausen, 1792)
- Oligonyx vulnerata (Butler, 1878)
- Olivenebula oberthueri (Staudinger, 1892)
- Omphalophana antirrhinii (Hübner, [1803])
- Omphalophana durnalayana Osthelder, 1933
- Oncocnemis campicola Lederer, 1853
- Oncocnemis confusa (Freyer, 1842)
- Oncocnemis exacta Christoph, 1887
- Oncocnemis kaszabi L. Ronkay, 1988
- Oncocnemis nigricula (Eversmann, 1847)
- Oncocnemis senica (Eversmann, 1856)
- Oncocnemis strioligera Lederer, 1853
- Ophiusa tirhaca (Cramer, 1773)
- Opigena polygona ([Denis & Schiffermüller], 1775)
- Oraesia emarginata (Fabricius, 1794)
- Oraesia excavata (Butler, 1878)
- Orbona fragariae (Vieweg, 1790)
- Oria musculosa (Hübner, [1808])
- Orthogonia sera Felder & R.Felder, 1862
- Orthosia ariuna Hreblay, 1991
- Orthosia askoldensis (Staudinger, 1892)
- Orthosia carnipennis (Butler, 1878)
- Orthosia cedemarki (Bryk, 1948)
- Orthosia cerasi (Fabricius, 1775)
- Orthosia coniortota (Filipjev, 1927)
- Orthosia cruda ([Denis & Schiffermüller], 1775)
- Orthosia ella (Butler, 1878)
- Orthosia evanida (Butler, 1879)
- Orthosia gothica (Linnaeus, 1758)
- Orthosia gracilis ([Denis & Schiffermüller], 1775)
- Orthosia incerta (Hufnagel, 1766)
- Orthosia lizetta (Butler, 1878)
- Orthosia miniosa ([Denis & Schiffermüller], 1775)
- Orthosia odiosa (Butler, 1878)
- Orthosia opima (Hübner, [1809])
- Orthosia paromoea (Hampson, 1905)
- Orthosia populeti (Fabricius, 1775)
- Orthosia satoi Sugi, 1960
- Orthosia sordescens Hreblay, 1993
- Orthosia ussuriana Kononenko, 1988
- Oruza mira (Butler, 1879)
- Oruza yoshinoensis Wileman, 1911
- Oxicesta geographica (Fabricius, 1787)
- Oxytripia orbiculosa (Esper, 1799)
- Pabulatrix pabulatricula (Brahm, 1791)
- Pachetra sagittigera (Hufnagel, 1766)
- Panchrysia deaurata (Esper, 1787)
- Panchrysia dives (Eversmann, 1844)
- Panchrysia ornata (Bremer, 1864)
- Panemeria tenebrata (Scopoli, 1763)
- Pangrapta costaemacula Staudinger, 1888
- Pangrapta flavomacula Staudinger, 1888
- Pangrapta griseola Staudinger, 1892
- Pangrapta lunulata Stertz, 1915
- Pangrapta marmorata Staudinger, 1888
- Pangrapta obscurata (Butler, 1879)
- Pangrapta suaveola Staudinger, 1888
- Pangrapta umbrosa (Leech, 1900)
- Pangrapta vasava (Butler, 1881)
- Panolis flammea ([Denis & Schiffermüller], 1775)
- Panthauma egregia Staudinger, 1892
- Panthea coenobita (Esper, 1785)
- Papestra biren (Goeze, 1781)
- Parabarrovia keelei Gibson, 1920
- Paracolax albinotata (Butler, 1879)
- Paracolax fascialis (Leech, 1889)
- Paracolax fentoni (Butler, 1879)
- Paracolax trilinealis (Bremer, 1864)
- Paracolax tristalis (Fabricius, 1794)
- Paradiarsia coturnicola (Graeser, 1892)
- Paradiarsia punicea (Hübner, [1803])
- Paragabara flavomacula (Oberthür, 1880)
- Paragabara ochreipennis Sugi, 1962
- Paragabara secunda Remm, 1983
- Paragona cognata (Staudinger, 1892)
- Paragona multisignata (Christoph, 1881)
- Paraphyllophylla confusa Kononenko, 1985
- Parascotia fuliginaria (Linnaeus, 1761)
- Parastichtis suspecta (Hübner, 1817)
- Parhylophila buddhae (Alphéraky, 1879)
- Parhylophila celsiana (Staudinger, 1887)
- Pechipogo plumigeralis Hübner, [1825])
- Pechipogo strigilata (Linnaeus, 1758)
- Pericyma albidentaria (Freyer, 1842)
- Peridroma saucia (Hübner, [1808])
- Perigrapha circumducta (Lederer, 1855)
- Perigrapha extincta Kononenko, 1989
- Perigrapha hoenei Pungeler, 1914
- Perigrapha i-cinctum ([Denis & Schiffermüller], 1775)
- Perigrapha rorida (Frivaldszky, 1835)
- Periphanes delphinii (Linnaeus, 1758)
- Periphanes treitschkei (Frivaldszky, 1835)
- Periphanes victorina (Sodoffsky, 1849)
- Phidrimana amurensis (Staudinger, 1892)
- Phlogophora aureopuncta (Hampson, 1908)
- Phlogophora beatrix Butler, 1878
- Phlogophora illustrata (Graeser, [1889])
- Phlogophora meticulosa (Linnaeus, 1758)
- Phlogophora scita (Hübner, 1790)
- Phoebophilus veternosa (Pungeler, 1907)
- Photedes captiuncula (Treitschke, 1825)
- Photedes extrema (Hübner, [1809])
- Photedes fluxa (Hübner, [1809])
- Photedes improba (Staudinger, 1898)
- Photedes minima (Haworth, 1809)
- Phragmatiphila nexa (Hübner, [1808])
- Phyllophila obliterata (Rambur, 1833)
- Phytometra amata (Butler, 1879)
- Phytometra viridaria (Clerck, 1759)
- Plusia festucae (Linnaeus, 1758)
- Plusia putnami (Grote, 1873)
- Plusidia cheiranthi (Tauscher, 1809)
- Plusilla rosalia Staudinger, 1892
- Plusiodonta casta (Butler, 1878)
- Polia altaica (Lederer, 1853)
- Polia bombycina (Hufnagel, 1766)
- Polia conspicua (Bang-Haas, 1912)
- Polia goliath (Oberthür, 1880)
- Polia hepatica (Clerck, 1759)
- Polia lama (Staudinger, 1896)
- Polia lamuta (Herz, 1903)
- Polia malchani (Draudt, 1934)
- Polia mortua (Staudinger, 1888)
- Polia nebulosa (Hufnagel, 1766)
- Polia richardsoni (Curtis, 1834)
- Polia serratilinea Ochsenheimer, 1816
- Polia tiefi Pungeler, 1914
- Polia vespertilio (Draudt, 1934)
- Polychrysia aurata (Staudinger, 1888)
- Polychrysia esmeralda (Oberthür, 1880)
- Polychrysia moneta (Fabricius, 1787)
- Polychrysia sica (Graeser, [1890])
- Polychrysia splendida (Butler, 1878)
- Polymixis atossa (Wiltshire, 1941)
- Polymixis latesco Fibiger, 2001
- Polymixis mandschurica Boursin, 1970
- Polymixis polymita (Linnaeus, 1761)
- Polymixis rosinae (Bohatsch, 1908)
- Polymixis rufocincta (Geyer, 1828)
- Polymixis trisignata (Menetries, 1847)
- Polyphaenis viridis (De Villers, 1789)
- Polypogon gryphalis (Herrich-Schäffer, 1851)
- Polypogon tentacularia (Linnaeus, 1758)
- Polysciera manleyi (Leech, 1900)
- Prognorisma albifurca (Erschoff, 1877)
- Prometopus flavicollis (Leech, 1889)
- Prospalta cyclica (Hampson, 1908)
- Protarchanara brevilinea (Fenn, 1864)
- Protodeltote distinguenda (Staudinger, 1888)
- Protodeltote pygarga (Hufnagel, 1766)
- Protodeltote wiscotti (Staudinger, 1888)
- Protolampra sobrina (Duponchel, 1843)
- Protoschinia scutosa ([Denis & Schiffermüller], 1775)
- Protoschrankia ijimai Sugi, 1979
- Pseudeustrotia candidula ([Denis & Schiffermüller], 1775)
- Pseudluperina pozzii (Curo, 1883)
- Pseudocosmia maculata Kononenko, 1985
- Pseudodeltote brunnea (Leech, 1889)
- Pseudohadena arenacea L. Ronkay, Varga & Fabian, 1995
- Pseudohadena argyllostigma (Varga & L. Ronkay, 1991)
- Pseudohadena clementissima L. Ronkay & Varga, 1993
- Pseudohadena commoda (Staudinger, 1889)
- Pseudohadena cymatodes Boursin, 1954
- Pseudohadena gnorima (Pilngeler, 1907)
- Pseudohadena igorkostjuki L. Ronkay, Varga & Fabian, 1995
- Pseudohadena immunda (Eversmann, 1842)
- Pseudohadena immunis (Staudinger, 1889)
- Pseudohadena minuta (Pungeler, 1899)
- Pseudohadena pugnax (Alphéraky, 1892)
- Pseudohadena stenoptera (Boursin, 1970)
- Pseudohermonassa melancholica (Lederer, 1853)
- Pseudohermonassa ononensis (Bremer, 1861)
- Pseudohermonassa velata (Staudinger, 1888)
- Pseudoips prasinana (Linnaeus, 1758)
- Pseudoips sylpha (Butler, 1879)
- Pseudopanolis heterogyna (Bang-Haas, 1927)
- Pygopteryx suava Staudinger, 1887
- Pyrocleptria cora (Eversrnan, 1837)
- Pyrrhia bifasciata (Staudinger, 1888)
- Pyrrhia exprimens (Walker, 1857)
- Pyrrhia hedemanni (Staudinger, 1892)
- Pyrrhia purpurina (Esper, 1804)
- Pyrrhia umbra (Hufnagel, 1766)
- Pyrrhidivalva sordida (Butler, 1881)
- Raphia peustera Pungeler, 1906
- Resapamea hedeni (Graeser, [1889])
- Resapamea vaskeni (Varga, 1979)
- Rhizedra lutosa (Hübner, [1803])
- Rhyacia arenacea (Hampson, 1907)
- Rhyacia caradrinoides (Staudinger, 1897)
- Rhyacia helvetina (Boisduval, 1833)
- Rhyacia junonia (Staudinger, 1881)
- Rhyacia ledereri (Erschoff, 1870)
- Rhyacia lucipeta ([Denis & Schiffermüller], 1775)
- Rhyacia nyctymerides (О. Bang-Haas, 1922)
- Rhyacia simulans (Hufnagel, 1766)
- Rhynchopalpus albula ([Denis & Schiffermüller], 1775)
- Rhynchopalpus banghaasi (West, 1925)
- Rhynchopalpus basifascia (Inoue, 1958)
- Rhynchopalpus bryophilaris (Staudinger, 1887)
- Rhynchopalpus costalis (Staudinger, 1887)
- Rhynchopalpus fumosa (Butler, 1879)
- Rhynchopalpus gigantula (Staudinger, 1879)
- Rhynchopalpus gigas (Butler, 1884)
- Rhynchopalpus mikabo Inoue, 1970
- Rhynchopalpus pulchella Leech, 1889
- Rhynchopalpus satoi Inoue, 1970
- Rhynchopalpus shimekii (Inoue, 1970)
- Rhynchopalpus strigula ([Denis & Schiffermüller], 1775)
- Rhynchopalpus strigulosa (Staudinger, 1887)
- Rhynchopalpus subgigas Inoue, 1982
- Rhynchopalpus togatulalis (Hübner, 1798)
- Rivula sericealis (Scopoli, 1763)
- Rivula unctalis Staudinger, 1892 8499
- Rotoa distincta (Bang-Haas, 1912)
- Rusina ferruginea (Esper, [1787])
- Sajania devagor (W. Kozhantschikov, 1923)
- Sapporia repetita (Butler, 1885)
- Saragossa demotica (Pungeler, 1902)
- Saragossa incerta (Staudinger, 1896)
- Saragossa porosa (Eversmann, 1854)
- Saragossa siccanorum (Staudinger, 1870)
- Saragossa uralica Hacker & Fibiger, 2002
- Sarbanissa subflava (Moore, 1877)
- Sarbanissa venusta (Leech, 1889)
- Sarcopolia illoba (Butler, 1878)
- Schinia bieneri (Rebel, 1926)
- Schinia cardui (Hübner, 1790)
- Schinia cognata (Fraser, 1833)
- Schinia imperialis (Staudinger, 1871)
- Schinia purpurascens (1auscher, 1809)
- Schinia scutata (Staudinger, 1895)
- Schrankia balneorum (Alphéraky, 1880)
- Schrankia costaestrigalis (Stephens, 1834)
- Schrankia kogii Inoue, 1979
- Schrankia separatalis (Herz, 1904)
- Schrankia taenialis (Hübner, [1809])
- Sclerogenia jessica (Butler, 1878)
- Scoliopteryx libatrix (Linnaeus, 1758)
- Scotochrosta pulla ([Denis & Schiffermüller], 1775)
- Scythocentropus misella (Pungeler, 1907)
- Scythocentropus scripturosa (Eversmann, 1854)
- Sedina buettneri (Hering, 1858)
- Senta flammea (Curtis, 1828)
- Serrodes campana Guenée, 1852
- Sesamia confusa (Sugi, 1982)
- Sesamia cretica Lederer, 1857
- Sesamia turpis (Butler, 1879)
- Sidemia bremeri (Erschoff, 1870)
- Sidemia spilogramma (Rambur, 1871)
- Sideridis egena (Lederer, 1853)
- Sideridis herczigi Varga & L. Ronkay, 1991
- Sideridis honeyi (Yoshimoto, 1989)
- Sideridis implexa (Hübner, [1809])
- Sideridis incommoda (Staudinger, 1888)
- Sideridis kitti (Schawerda, 1914)
- Sideridis lampra (Schawerda, 1913)
- Sideridis mandarina (Leech, 1900)
- Sideridis remmiana Kononenko, 1982
- Sideridis reticulata (Goeze, 1781)
- Sideridis rivularis (Fabricius, 1775)
- Sideridis turbida (Esper, 1790)
- Sideridis unica (Leech, 1889)
- Sideridis unicolor (Alphéraky, 1889)
- Simplicia rectalis (Eversmann, 1842)
- Simyra albovenosa (Goeze, 1781)
- Simyra dentinosa (Freyer, 1838)
- Simyra nervosa ([Denis & Schiffermüller], 1775)
- Simyra splendida Staudinger, 1888
- Sinarella aegrota (But1er, 1879)
- Sinarella cristulalis (Staudinger, 1892)
- Sinarella japonica (Butler, 1881)
- Sinarella nigrisigna (Leech, 1900)
- Sinarella punctalis (Herz, 1904)
- Sineugraphe bipartita (Graeser, [1889])
- Sineugraphe exusta (Butler, 1878)
- Sineugraphe oceanica (Kardakoff, 1928)
- Sinna extrema (Walker, 1854)
- Sinocharis korbae Piingeler, 1912
- Sophta subrosea (Butler, 1881)
- Spaelotis lucens Butler, 1881
- Spaelotis ravida ([Denis & Schiffermüller], 1775)
- Spaelotis senna (Freyer, 1829)
- Spaelotis sennina Boursin, 1955
- Spaelotis suecica (Aurivillius, 1889)
- Sphragifera sigillata (Menetries, 1859)
- Spirama helicina (Hübner, [1831])
- Spodoptera depravata (Butler, 1879)
- Spodoptera exigua (Hübner, [1808])
- Spodoptera litura (Fabricius, 1775)
- Standfussiana lucernea (Linnaeus, 1758)
- Standfussiana nictymera (Boisduval, 1834)
- Staurophora celsia (Linnaeus, 1758)
- Stenbergmania albomaculalis (Bremer, 1864)
- Stenodrina aeschista (Boursin, 1937)
- Stenoloba assimilis (Warren, 1909)
- Stenoloba jankowskii (Oberthür, 1884)
- Stilbina nictitans (Bremer & Grey, 1853)
- Stygiodrina maurella (Staudinger, 1888)
- Subleuconycta palshkovi (Filipjev, 1937)
- Sugia stygia (Butler, 1878)
- Sympistis funebris (Hübner, [1809])
- Sympistis heliophila (Paykull, 1793)
- Sympistis lapponica (Thunberg, 1791)
- Sympistis nigrita (Boisduval, 1840)
- Syngrapha ain (Hochenwarth, 1785)
- Syngrapha diasema (Boisduval, 1829)
- Syngrapha gilarovi Kljutschko, 1983
- Syngrapha hochenwarthi (Hochenwarth, 1785)
- Syngrapha interrogationis (Linnaeus, 1758)
- Syngrapha microgamma (Hübner, [1823])
- Syngrapha ottolengui (Dyar, 1903)
- Syngrapha parilis (Hübner, [1809])
- Sypnoides fumosa (Butler, 1877)
- Sypnoides hercules (Butler, 1881)
- Sypnoides picta (Butler, 1877)
- Tambana plumbea (Butler, 1881)
- Tarachidia candefacta (Hübner, [1827])
- Teinoptera olivina (Herrich-Schäffer, 1852)
- Telorta divergens (Butler, 1879)
- Telorta edentata (Leech, 1889)
- Teratoglaea pacifica Sugi, 1958
- Thalpophila matura (Hufnagel, 1766)
- Tholera cespitis ([Denis & Schiffermüller], 1775)
- Tholera decimalis (Poda, 1761)
- Tholera hilaris (Staudinger, 1901)
- Thyas juno (Dalman, 1823)
- Thysanoplusia intermixta (Warren, 1913)
- Tiliacea auragides (Draudt, 1950)
- Tiliacea citrago (Linnaeus, 1758)
- Tiliacea japonago (Wileman & West, 1929)
- Trachea atriplicis (Linnaeus, 1758)
- Trachea melanospila Kollar, [1844]
- Trachea punkikonis Matsumura, 1927
- Trachea tokiensis (Butler, 1884)
- Trichoplusia ni (Hübner, [1803])
- Trichosea champa (Moore, 1879)
- Trichosea ludifica (Linnaeus, 1758)
- Triphaenopsis cinerescens Butler, 1885
- Triphaenopsis insolita Remm, 1983
- Triphaenopsis jezoensis Sugi, 1962
- Triphaenopsis lucilla Butler, 1878
- Triphaenopsis postflava (Leech, 1900)
- Trisateles emortualis ([Denis & Schiffermüller], 1775)
- Tyta luctuosa ([Denis & Schiffermüller], 1775)
- Ulochlaena hirta (Hübner, 1813)
- Usbeca kulmburgi (Rebel, 1918)
- Valeria dilutiapicata Filipjev, 1927
- Victrix fabiani Varga & L. Ronkay, 1989
- Victrix frigidalis Varga & L. Ronkay, 1991
- Victrix umovii (Eversmann, 1846)
- Virgo datanidia (Butler, 1885)
- Xanthia togata (Esper, 1788)
- Xanthocosmia jankowskii (Oberthür, 1884)
- Xanthograpta basinigra Sugi, 1982
- Xanthomantis contaminata (Draudt, 1937)
- Xanthomantis cornelia (Staudinger, 1888)
- Xenotrachea niphonica Kishida & Yoshimoto, 1979
- Xestia aequaeva (Benjamin, 1934)
- Xestia agathina (Duponchel, 1827)
- Xestia alaskae (Grote, 1876)
- Xestia albonigra (Kononenko, 1981)
- Xestia albuncula (Eversmann, 1851)
- Xestia alpicola (Zetterstedt, 1839)
- Xestia ashworthii (Doubleday, 1855)
- Xestia atrata (Morrison, 1874)
- Xestia baja ([Denis & Schiffermüller], 1775)
- Xestia banghaasi (Corti & Draudt, 1933)
- Xestia borealis (Nordstrom, 1933)
- Xestia brunneopicta (Matsumura, 1925)
- Xestia castanea (Esper, 1798)
- Xestia cohaesa (Herrich-Schäffer, 1849)
- Xestia collina (Boisduval, 1840)
- Xestia descripta (Bremer, 1861)
- Xestia dilatata (Butler, 1879)
- Xestia distensa (Eversmann, 1851)
- Xestia ditrapezium ([Denis & Schiffermüller], 1775)
- Xestia efflorescens (Butler, 1879)
- Xestia fergusoni Lafontaine, 1983
- Xestia fuscogrisea Кononenko, 1981
- Xestia fuscostigma (Bremer, 1861)
- Xestia gelida (Sparre-Schneider, 1883)
- Xestia homogena (McDunnough, 1921)
- Xestia intermedia Kononenko, 1981
- Xestia inuitica Lafontaine &, Hensel, 1998
- Xestia kollari (Lederer, 1853)
- Xestia kolymae (Herz, 1903)
- Xestia kruegeri Kononenko & Schmitz, 2004
- Xestia kurentzovi (Kononenko, 1984)
- Xestia laetabilis (Zetterstedt, 1839)
- Xestia liquidaria (Eversmann, 1844)
- Xestia lorezi (Staudinger, 1891)
- Xestia lyngei (Rebel, 1923)
- Xestia magadanensis Kononenko & Lafontaine, 1983
- Xestia magadanica (Kononenko, 1981)
- Xestia ochreago (Hübner,[1809])
- Xestia ochrops Kononenko, 1996
- Xestia okakensis (Packard, 1867)
- Xestia penthima (Erschoff, 1870)
- Xestia quieta (Hübner, [1813])
- Xestia rhaetica (Staudinger, 1871)
- Xestia rodionovi Mikkola, 1996
- Xestia sareptana (Herrich-Schäffer, 1851)
- Xestia semiherbida (Walker, 1857)
- Xestia sexstrigata (Haworth, 1809)
- Xestia similis (Kononenko, 1981)
- Xestia sincera (Herrich-Schäffer, 1851)
- Xestia speciosa (Hübner, [1813])
- Xestia stigmatica (Hübner, [1813])
- Xestia stupenda (Butler, 1878)
- Xestia subgrisea (Staudinger, 1897)
- Xestia tecta (Hübner, [1808])
- Xestia thula Lafontaine & Kononenko, 1983
- Xestia triangulum (Hufnagel, 1766)
- Xestia trifida (Fischer von Waldheim, 1820)
- Xestia undosa (Leech, 1889)
- Xestia ursae (McDunnough, 1940)
- Xestia vidua (Staudinger, 1892)
- Xestia wockei (Moschler, 1862)
- Xestia xanthographa ([Denis & Schiffermüller], 1775)
- Xestia c-nigrum (Linnaeus, 1758)
- Xylena confusa Kononenko & L. Ronkay, 1998
- Xylena exsoleta (Linnaeus, 1758)
- Xylena lunifera (Warren, 1910)
- Xylena vetusta (Hübner, [1813])
- Xylomoia fusei Sugi, 1976
- Xylomoia graminea (Graeser, 1889)
- Xylomoia retinax Mikkola, 1998
- Xylomoia strix Mikkola, 1980
- Xylopolia bellula Kononenko & L. Ronkay, 1995
- Zanclognatha fumosa (Butler, 1879)
- Zanclognatha griselda (Butler, 1879)
- Zanclognatha helva (But1er, 1879)
- Zanclognatha lilacina (Butler, 1879)
- Zanclognatha lunalis (Scopoli, 1763)
- Zanclognatha obliqua (Staudinger, 1892)
- Zanclognatha perfractalis Bryk, 1948
- Zanclognatha reticulatis (Leech, 1900)
- Zanclognatha subgriselda Sugi, 1959
- Zanclognatha tarsipennalis (Treitschke, 1835)
- Zanclognatha tenuialis Rebel, 1896
- Zanclognatha triplex (Leech, 1900)
- Zanclognatha tristriga W. Kozhantschikov, 1929
- Zanclognatha umbrosalis Staudinger, 1892
- Zanclognatha violacealis Staudinger, 1892
- Zekelita antiqualis (Hübner, [1813])
- Zekelita ravalis (Herrich-Schäffer, 1851)
- Zekelita ravulalis (Staudinger, 1879)

== Micronoctuidae ==
- Mimachrostia fasciata Sugi, 1982
- Parens occi (Fibiger & Kononenko, 2008)

== Arctiidae ==
- Acerbia alpina (Quensel, 1802)
- Aemene taeniata (Fixsen, 1887)
- Amurrhyparia leopardinula (Strand, 1919)
- Arctia flavia (Fuessly, 1779)
- Arctia olschwangi Dubatolov, 1990
- Arctia caja (Linnaeus, 1758)
- Atolmis rubricollis (Linnaeus, 1758)
- Axiopoena karelini (Menetries, 1863)
- Bizone adelina Staudinger, 1887
- Borearctia menetriesii (Eversmann, 1846)
- Callimorpha dominula (Linnaeus, 1758)
- Centrarctia mongolica (Аlpheraky, 1888)
- Chelis caecilia (Kindermann, 1853)
- Chelis dahurica (Boisduval, 1834)
- Chelis maculosa (Gerning, 1780)
- Chelis obliterata (Stretch, 1885)
- Chelis philipiana Ferguson, 1985
- Chelis quenseli (Paykull, 1793)
- Chelis reticulata (Christoph, 1887)
- Chionarctia nivea (Menetries, 1858)
- Collita coreana (Leech, 1888)
- Collita digna (Ignatyev & Witt, 2007)
- Collita griseola (Hübner, 1803)
- Collita okanoi (Inoue, 1961)
- Collita vetusta (Walker, 1854)
- Coscinia cribraria (Linnaeus, 1758)
- Cybosia mesomella (Linnaeus, 1758)
- Cymbalophora rivularis (Menetries, 1832)
- Diacrisia irene Butler, 1881
- Diacrisia sannio (Linnaeus, 1758)
- Diaphora mendica (Clerck, 1759)
- Dodia albertae Dyar, 1901
- Dodia diaphana (Eversmann, 1848)
- Dodia kononenkoi Tshistjakov & Lafontaine, 1984
- Dodia maja Rekelj & Česanek, 2009
- Dodia sazonovi Dubatolov, 1990
- Dodia sikhotensis Tshistjakov, 1988
- Dodia transbaikalensis Tshistjakov, 1988
- Eilema aegrotum (Butler, 1877)
- Eilema affineolum (Bremer, 1864)
- Eilema anticum (Walker, 1854)
- Eilema atratulum (Eversmann, 1847)
- Eilema caniolum (Hilbner, [1808])
- Eilema complanum (Linnaeus, 1758)
- Eilema coreanum (Leech, [1889])
- Eilema cribratum (Staudinger, 1887)
- Eilema debile (Staudinger, 1887)
- Eilema deplanum (Esper, 1787)
- Eilema flavociliatum (Lederer, 1853)
- Eilema griseolum (Hübner, [1803])
- Eilema hyalinofuscatum Tshistjakov, 1990
- Eilema japonicum (Leech, [1889])
- Eilema lurideolum ([Zincken], 1817)
- Eilema lutarellum (Linnaeus, 1758)
- Eilema minor Okano, 1955
- Eilema nankingicum (Daniel, 1954)
- Eilema nigripodum (Bremer & Grey, 1852)
- Eilema nigrocollare Tshistjakov, 1990
- Eilema palliatellum (Scopoli, 1763)
- Eilema pseudocomplanum (Daniel, 1939)
- Eilema pygmaeolum (Doubleday, 1847)
- Eilema sororculum (Hufnagel, 1766)
- Eilema ussuricum (Daniel, 1954)
- Eilema vakulenkoi Tshistjakov, 1990
- Epatolmis caesarea (Goeze, 1781)
- Epimydia dialampra Staudinger, 1892
- Eucharia festiva (Hufnagel, 1766)
- Euplagia quadripunctaria (Poda, 1761)
- Ghoria collitoides (Butler, 1885)
- Ghoria gigantea (Oberthür, 1879)
- Grammia kodara Dubatolov & Schmidt, 2005
- Heliosia rufa (Leech, 1890)
- Holoarctia dubatolovi Saldaitis & Ivinskis, 2005
- Holoarctia marinae Dubatolov, 1985
- Holoarctia puengeleri (О. Bang-Haas, 1927)
- Hyperborea czekanowskii Grum-Grshimailo, [1900]
- Hyphantria cunea (Drury, 1773)
- Hyphoraia aulica (Linnaeus, 1758)
- Lacydes spectabilis (Tauscher, 1806)
- Lithosia quadra (Linnaeus, 1758)
- Macrobrochis staudingeri (Alphéraky, 1897)
- Manulea pseudofumidisca Dubatolov & Zolotuhin, 2011
- Melanaema venata Butler, 1877
- Miltochrista aberrans Butler, 1877
- Miltochrista calamina Butler, 1877
- Miltochrista miniata (Forster, 1771)
- Miltochrista pallida (Bremer, 1864)
- Miltochrista pulchra Butler, 1877
- Miltochrista rosacea (Bremer, 1861)
- Miltochrista striata (Bremer & Grey, 1852)
- Nudaria mundana (Linnaeus, 1761)
- Nudaridia muscula (Staudinger, 1887)
- Nudaridia ochracea (Bremer, 1861)
- Nudina artaxidia (Butler, 1881)
- Ocnogyna loewii (Zeller, 1846)
- Paidia murina (Hübner, 1790)
- Palearctia mira Dubatolov & Tshistjakov, 1989
- Pararctia lapponica (Thunberg, 1791)
- Pararctia subnebulosa (Dyar, 1899)
- Parasemia plantaginis (Linnaeus, 1758)
- Parasiccia altaica (Lederer, 1855)
- Pelosia angusta (Staudinger, 1887)
- Pelosia muscerda (Hufnagel, 1766)
- Pelosia noctis (Butler, 1881)
- Pelosia obtusa (Herrich-Schäffer, 1847)
- Pelosia ramosula (Staudinger, 1887)
- Pericallia matronula (Linnaeus, 1758)
- Phragmatobia amurensis Seitz, 1910
- Phragmatobia fuliginosa (Linnaeus, 1758)
- Platarctia atropurpurea (О. Bang-Haas, 1927)
- Rhyparia purpurata (Linnaeus, 1758)
- Rhyparioides amurensis (Bremer, 1861)
- Rhyparioides metelkana (Lederer, 1861)
- Rhyparioides nebulosa Butler, 1877
- Setema cereola (Hübner, [1803])
- Setina aurata (Menetries, 1832)
- Setina irrorella (Linnaeus, 1758)
- Setina roscida ([Denis & Schiffermüller], 1775)
- Sibirarctia buraetica (О. Bang-Haas, 1927)
- Sibirarctia kindermanni (Staudinger, 1867)
- Somatrichia parasita (Hübner, 1790)
- Spilarctia lutea (Hufnagel, 1766)
- Spilarctia obliquizonata (Miyake, 1910)
- Spilarctia seriatopunctata (Motschulsky, [1861])
- Spilarctia subcarnea (Walker, 1855)
- Spilosoma lubricipedum (Linnaeus, 1758)
- Spilosoma mienshanicum Daniel, 1943
- Spilosoma punctarium (Stoll, [1782])
- Spilosoma urticae (Esper, 1789)
- Spiris bipunctata (Staudinger, 1892)
- Spiris striata (Linnaeus, 1758)
- Stigmatophora flava (Bremer & Grey, 1852)
- Stigmatophora leacrita (Swinhoe, 1894)
- Stigmatophora micans (Bremer & Grey, 1852)
- Stigmatophora rhodophila (Walker, 1864)
- Thumatha senex (Hübner, [1808])
- Thyrgorina boghaika (Tshistjakov & Kishida, 1994)
- Thyrgorina jankowskii (Oberthür, [1881])
- Tyria jacobaeae (Linnaeus, 1758)
- Utetheisa lotrix (Cramer, 1779)
- Utetheisa pulchella (Linnaeus, 1758)
- Watsonarctia deserta (Bartel, 1902)
- Epicallia villica (Linnaeus, 1758)

== Syntomidae ==
- Dysauxes ancilla (Linnaeus, 1758)
- Dysauxes famula (Freyer, 1836)
- Dysauxes punctata (Fabricius, 1781)
- Syntomis caspia Staudinger, 1877
- Syntomis fortunei (de l'Orza, 1859)
- Syntomis ganssuensis Grum-Grshimailo, 1890
- Syntomis germana С.Felder & R.Felder, 1862
- Syntomis kruegeri (Ragusa, 1904)
- Syntomis nigricornis Alphéraky, 1883
- Syntomis phegea (Linnaeus, 1758)
- Syntomis transcaspica (Obraztsov, 1941)
