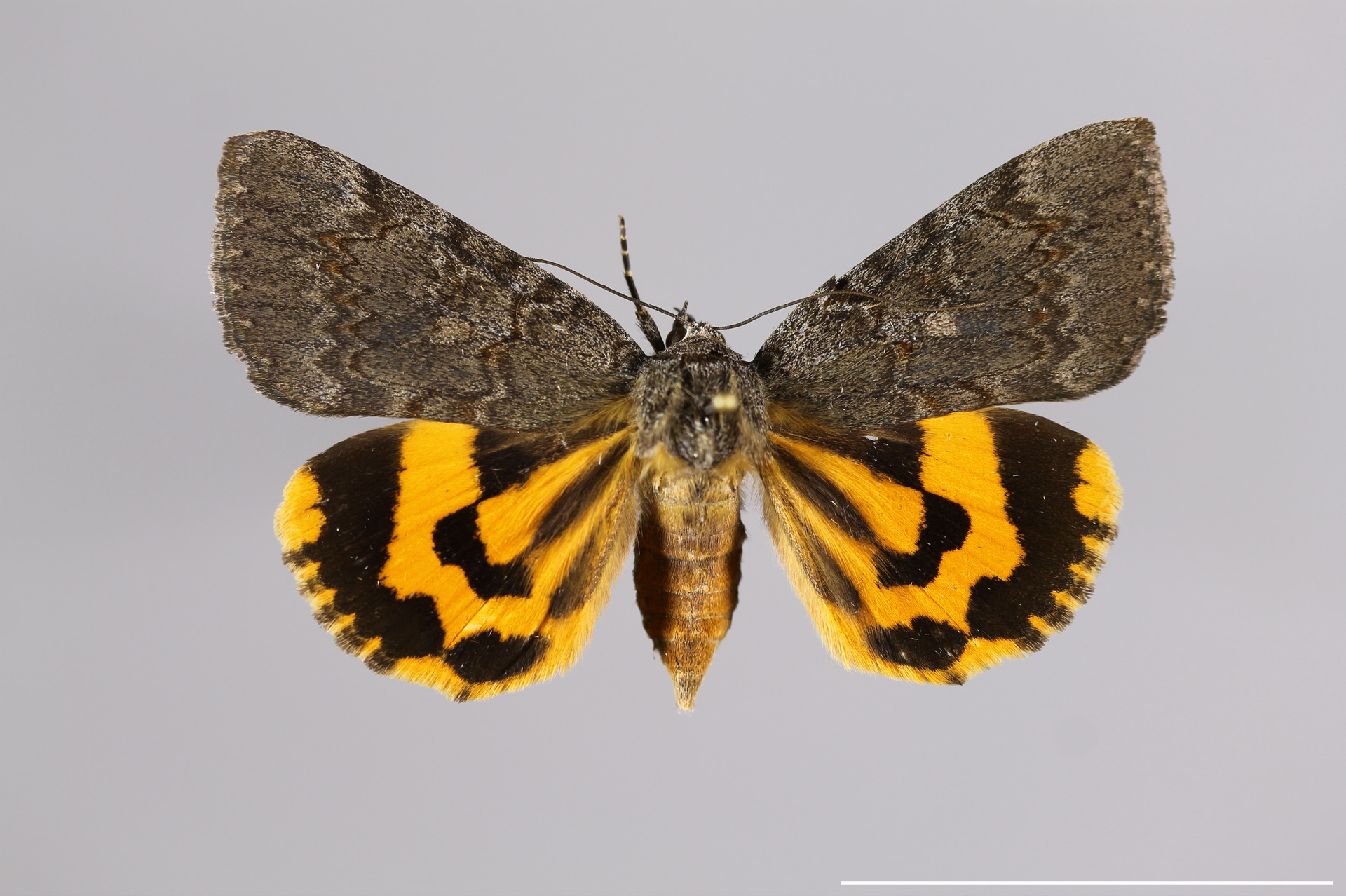
- dorsal view
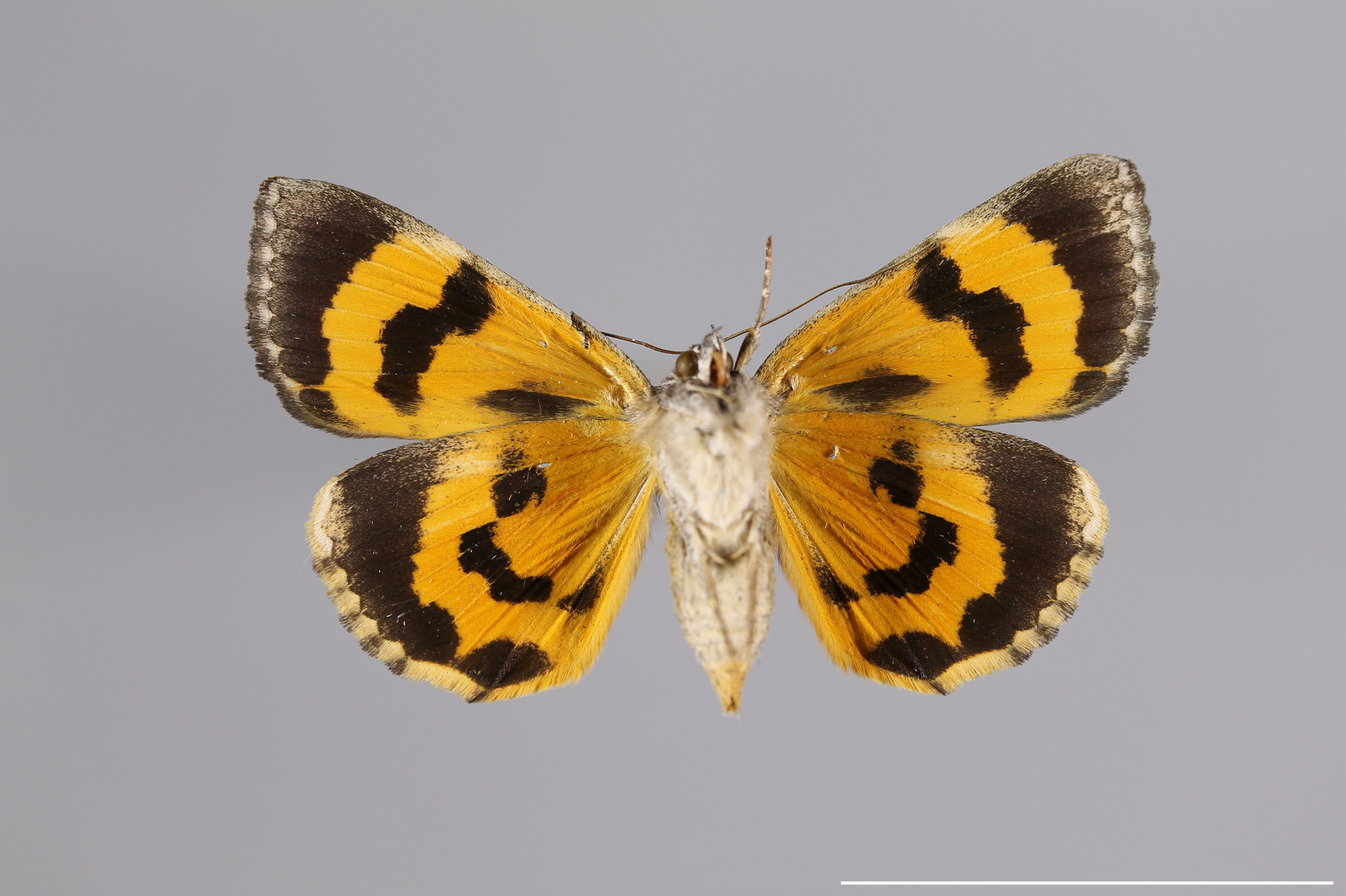
- ventral view

Scientific classification
- Kingdom: Animalia
- Phylum: Arthropoda
- Class: Insecta
- Order: Lepidoptera
- Superfamily: Noctuoidea
- Family: Erebidae
- Genus: Catocala
- Species: C. nymphaeoides

Binomial name
- Catocala nymphaeoides Herrich-Schäffer, 1852

Synonyms
- Catocala nymphula Staudinger, 1892

= Catocala nymphaeoides =

Species of moth

Catocala nymphaeoides is a moth in the family Erebidae first described by Gottlieb August Wilhelm Herrich-Schäffer in 1852. It is found in south-eastern Siberia.
