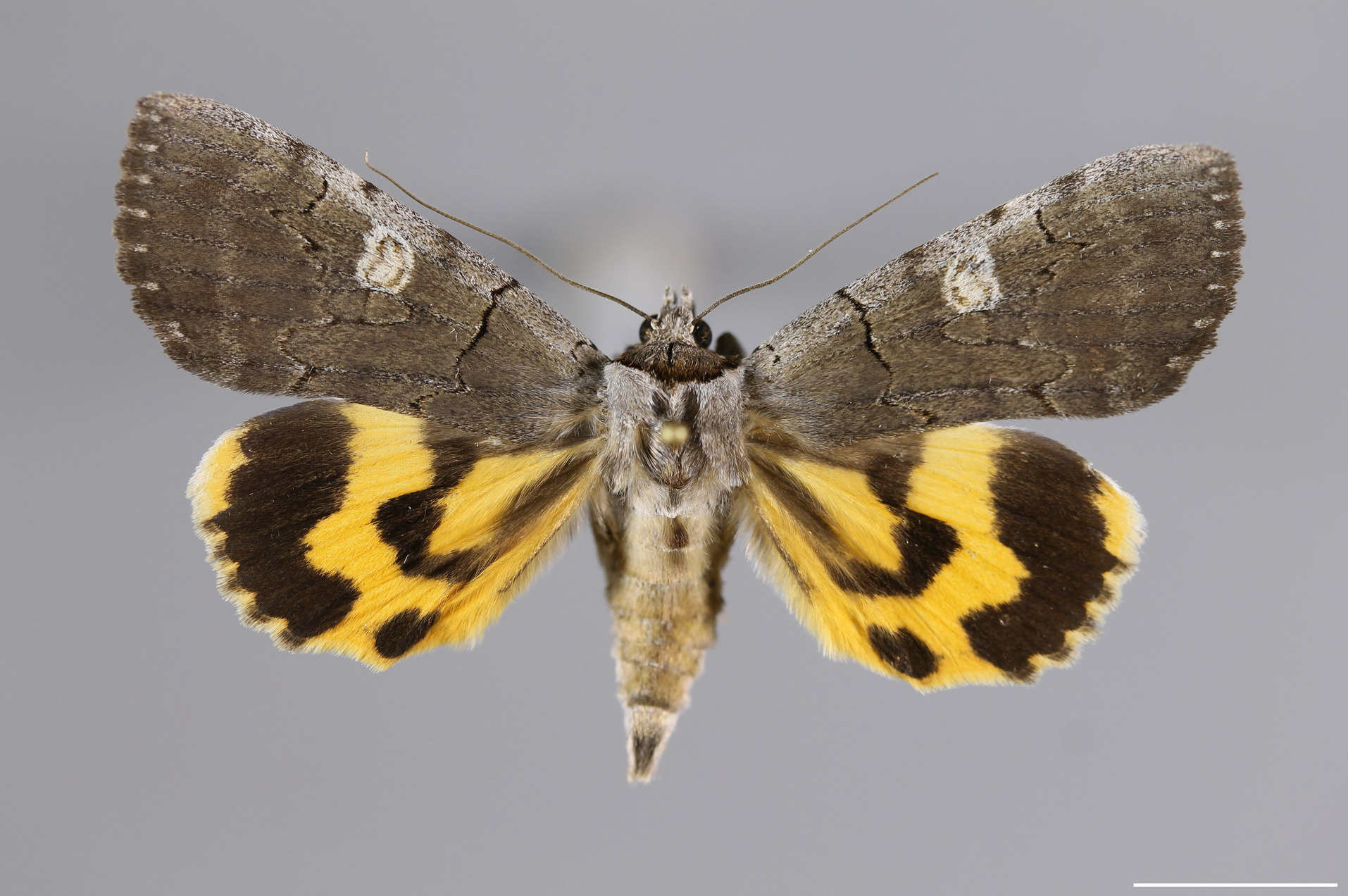

Scientific classification
- Kingdom: Animalia
- Phylum: Arthropoda
- Class: Insecta
- Order: Lepidoptera
- Superfamily: Noctuoidea
- Family: Erebidae
- Genus: Catocala
- Species: C. agitatrix

Binomial name
- Catocala agitatrix Graeser, 1889

Synonyms
- Catocala mabella Holland, 1889; Catocala mabella kobayashii Ishizuka, 2010

= Catocala agitatrix =

Species of moth

Catocala agitatrix is a moth of the family Erebidae. It is found in the Russian Far East (Primorye, Khabarovsk, Southern Amur), China, Korea, Japan (Hokkaido, Honshu).

The wingspan is about 62 mm.

== Subspecies ==
- Catocala agitatrix agitatrix
- Catocala agitatrix kobayashii Ishizuka, 2010 (Japan: Hokkaido)
- Catocala agitatrix shaanxiensis Ishizuka, 2010 (China: Shaanxi)
