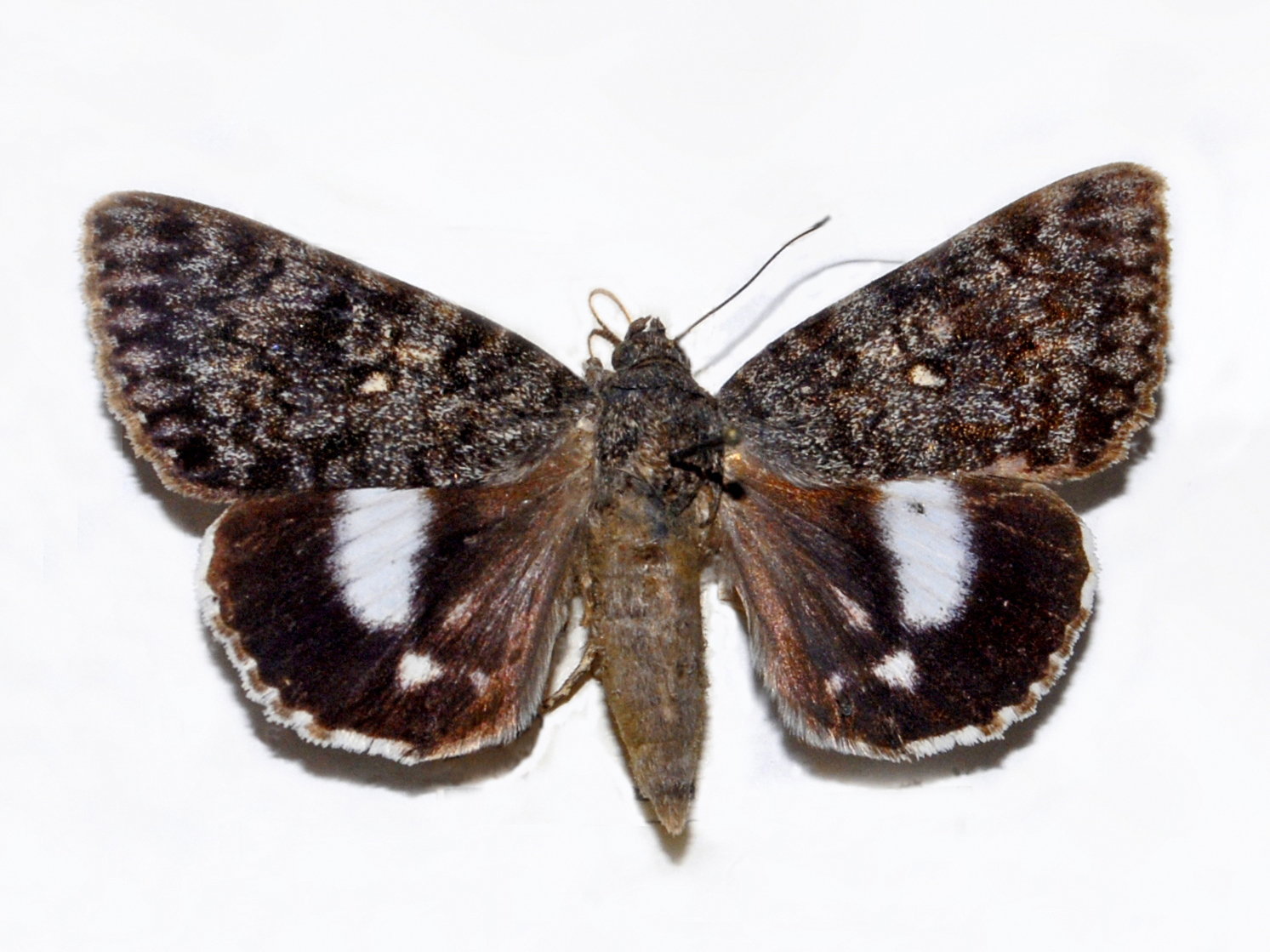
- Mounted specimen

Scientific classification
- Kingdom: Animalia
- Phylum: Arthropoda
- Class: Insecta
- Order: Lepidoptera
- Superfamily: Noctuoidea
- Family: Erebidae
- Genus: Catocala
- Species: C. actaea

Binomial name
- Catocala actaea Felder & Rogenhofer, 1874

Synonyms
- Ephesia nigricans Mell, 1939

= Catocala actaea =

Species of moth

Catocala actaea is a moth of the family Erebidae first described by Rudolf Felder and Alois Friedrich Rogenhofer in 1874.

== Subspecies ==
- Catocala actaea actaea
- Catocala actaea nigricans (Mell, 1939) (Shanxi)

== Description ==
The wingspan of Catocala actaea can reach about 52–60 millimetres (2.0–2.4 in). This moths has cryptically coloured forewings. Hindwings are mostly blackish, with a white stripe and a small white spot in the middle.

== Distribution ==
This species can be found in Japan, the Korean Peninsula, the Russian Far East and northern China.
