= Catocala koreana =

Scientific classification
- Kingdom: Animalia
- Phylum: Arthropoda
- Class: Insecta
- Order: Lepidoptera
- Superfamily: Noctuoidea
- Family: Erebidae
- Genus: Catocala
- Species: C. koreana

Binomial name
- Catocala koreana Staudinger, 1892

Synonyms
- Catocala paranympha koreana Staudinger, 1892; Catocala hymenaea ussurica Sheljuzhko, 1943; Catocala azumiensis Sugi, 1965

Species of moth

Catocala koreana is a moth in the family Erebidae first described by Staudinger in 1892. It is found in Japan, Korea and south-eastern Siberia.
