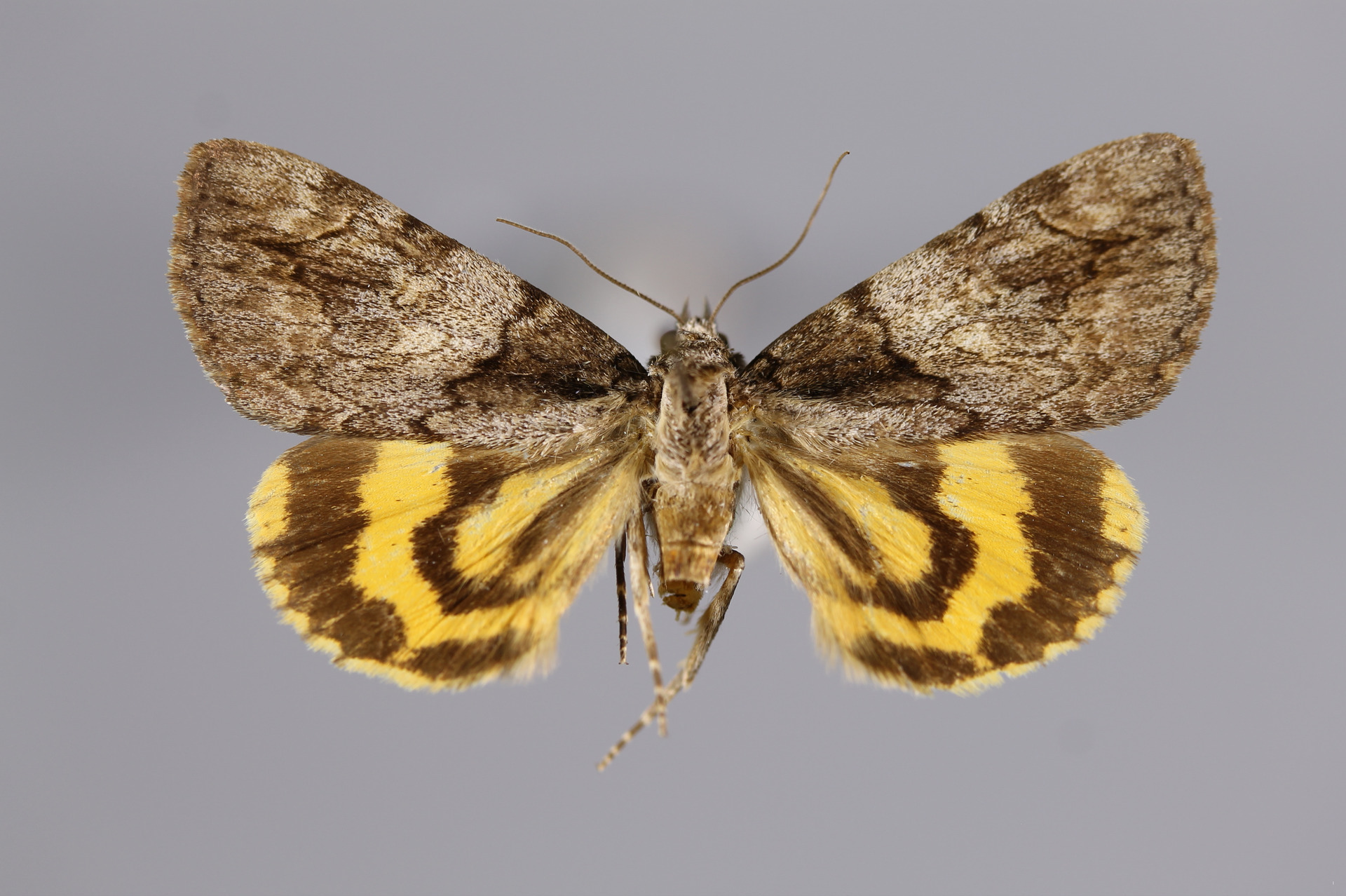

Scientific classification
- Kingdom: Animalia
- Phylum: Arthropoda
- Class: Insecta
- Order: Lepidoptera
- Superfamily: Noctuoidea
- Family: Erebidae
- Genus: Catocala
- Species: C. proxeneta

Binomial name
- Catocala proxeneta Alphéraky, 1895

= Catocala proxeneta =

Species of moth

Catocala proxeneta is a moth in the family Erebidae first described by Sergei Alphéraky in 1895. It is found in Mongolia and the Russian Far East (Ussuri).

== Subspecies ==
- Catocala proxeneta proxeneta
- Catocala proxeneta sutschana Sheljuzhko, 1943 (Ussuri)
