= Catocala streckeri =

Scientific classification
- Domain: Eukaryota
- Kingdom: Animalia
- Phylum: Arthropoda
- Class: Insecta
- Order: Lepidoptera
- Superfamily: Noctuoidea
- Family: Erebidae
- Genus: Catocala
- Species: C. streckeri

Binomial name
- Catocala streckeri Staudinger, 1888

Synonyms
- Ephesia strecceri Hampson, 1913

Species of moth

Catocala streckeri is a moth of the family Erebidae. It is found in the Russian Far East (Amur, Khabarovsk, Primorye, Sakhalin, Southern Kuriles), Korea, China and Japan (Hokkaido, Honshu, Shikoku).

The wingspan is about 52 mm.
