= Catocala pirata =

Scientific classification
- Domain: Eukaryota
- Kingdom: Animalia
- Phylum: Arthropoda
- Class: Insecta
- Order: Lepidoptera
- Superfamily: Noctuoidea
- Family: Erebidae
- Genus: Catocala
- Species: C. pirata

Binomial name
- Catocala pirata (Herz, 1904)

Synonyms
- Koraia pirata Herz, 1904

Species of moth

Catocala pirata is a moth of the family Erebidae. It is found in the Russian Far East (Primorye) and North Korea.

The wingspan is about 43 mm.
