= Catocala eminens =

Scientific classification
- Kingdom: Animalia
- Phylum: Arthropoda
- Class: Insecta
- Order: Lepidoptera
- Superfamily: Noctuoidea
- Family: Erebidae
- Genus: Catocala
- Species: C. eminens

Binomial name
- Catocala eminens Staudinger, 1892

Species of moth

Catocala eminens is a moth in the family Erebidae first described by Otto Staudinger in 1892. It is found in south-eastern Siberia.
