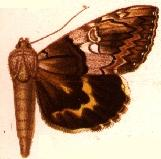
- Catocala deuteronympha omphale

Scientific classification
- Kingdom: Animalia
- Phylum: Arthropoda
- Class: Insecta
- Order: Lepidoptera
- Superfamily: Noctuoidea
- Family: Erebidae
- Genus: Catocala
- Species: C. deuteronympha

Binomial name
- Catocala deuteronympha Staudinger, 1861

Synonyms
- Catocala dahurica Klyuchko, 1992; Catocala greyi Staudinger, 1888

= Catocala deuteronympha =

Species of moth

Catocala deuteronympha is a moth of the family Erebidae. It is found from eastern Siberia to Japan and Korea.

The length of the forewings is about 27 mm.

It orients vertically when resting on tree trunks.

== Subspecies ==
- Catocala deuteronympha deuteronympha
- Catocala deuteronympha dahurica Klyuchko, 1992
- Catocala deuteronympha omphale Butler, 1881 (South-eastern Siberia and Japan)
- Catocala deuteronympha tschiliensis Bang-Haas, 1927
