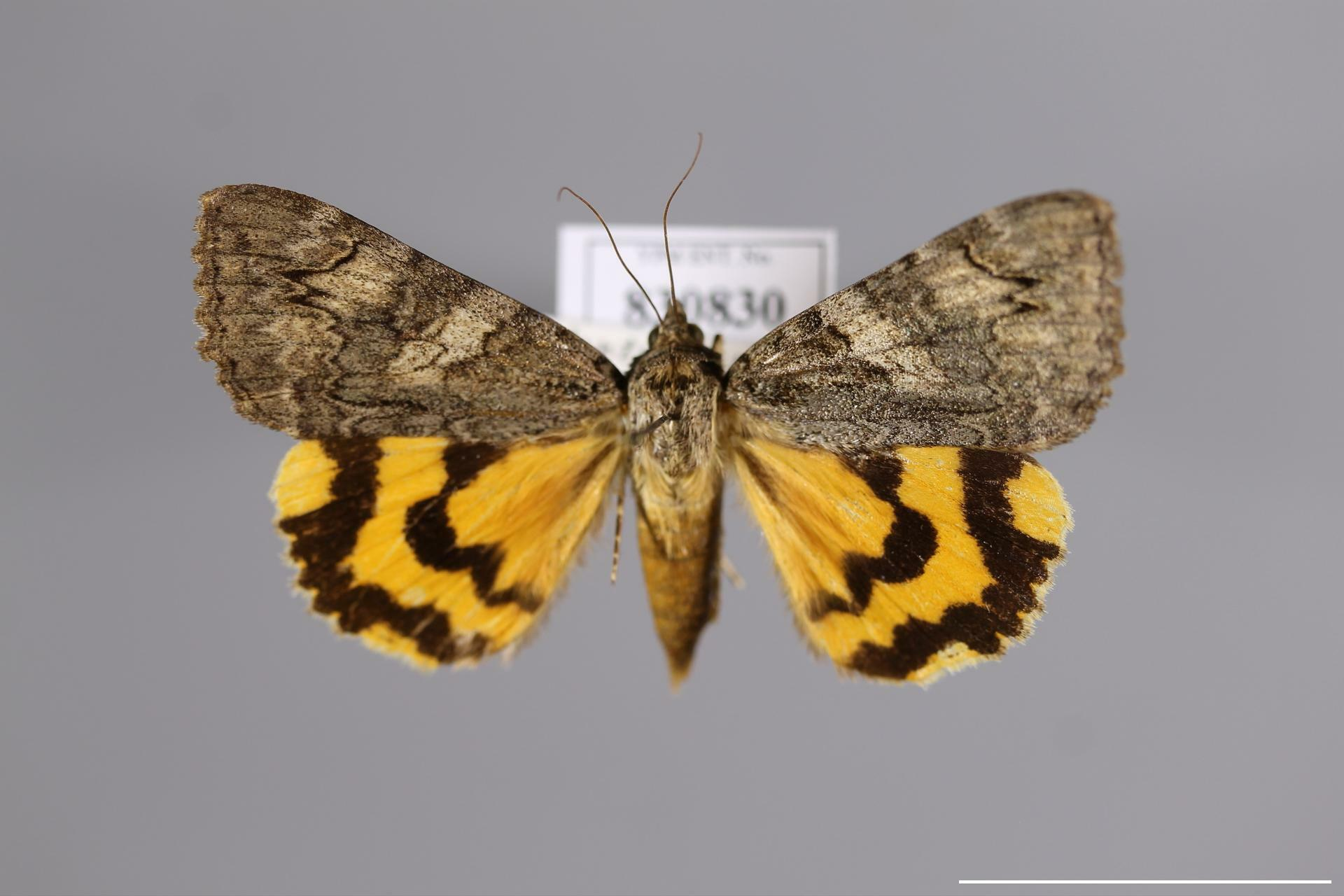

Scientific classification
- Kingdom: Animalia
- Phylum: Arthropoda
- Class: Insecta
- Order: Lepidoptera
- Superfamily: Noctuoidea
- Family: Erebidae
- Genus: Catocala
- Species: C. helena

Binomial name
- Catocala helena Eversmann, 1856

Synonyms
- Ephesia helena; Ephasia helena kurenzovi Moltrecht, 1927; Ephesia helena beicki Mell, 1936

= Catocala helena =

Species of moth

Catocala helena is a moth of the family Erebidae. It is found in Siberia and Manchuria.

Expansion of its distribution westward, presumably due to human activity, was recorded.

The length of the forewings is about 30 mm.

== Subspecies ==
- Catocala helena helena
- Catocala helena kurenzovi (Moltrecht, 1927) (South-eastern Siberia)
- Catocala helena beicki (Mell, 1936) (Manchuria)
