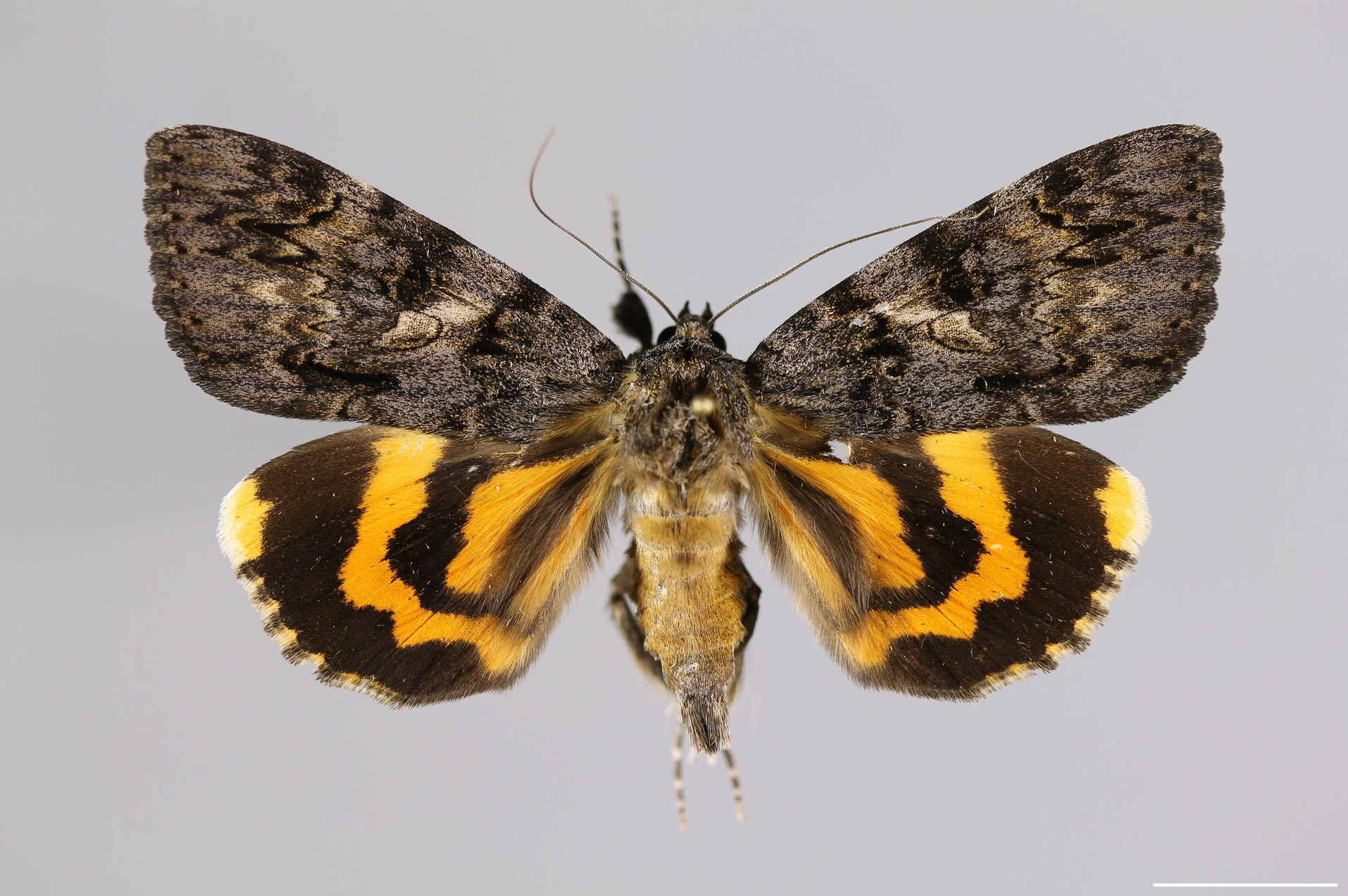

Scientific classification
- Domain: Eukaryota
- Kingdom: Animalia
- Phylum: Arthropoda
- Class: Insecta
- Order: Lepidoptera
- Superfamily: Noctuoidea
- Family: Erebidae
- Genus: Catocala
- Species: C. doerriesi

Binomial name
- Catocala doerriesi Staudinger, 1888

Synonyms
- Catocala honrathi Graeser, 1888; Catocala hampsoni Leech, 1900

= Catocala doerriesi =

Species of moth

Catocala doerriesi is a moth of the family Erebidae. It is found in north-eastern Russia (Amur, Khavarovsk, Primorye), northern China and Korea.

The wingspan is about 67 mm.
