= Belciades =

Scientific classification
- Domain: Eukaryota
- Kingdom: Animalia
- Phylum: Arthropoda
- Class: Insecta
- Order: Lepidoptera
- Superfamily: Noctuoidea
- Family: Noctuidae (?)
- Subfamily: Catocalinae
- Genus: Belciades; Kozhanchikov, 1950
- Species: B. niveola

Binomial name
- Belciades niveola (Motschulsky, 1866)

Genus of moths

Belciades is a monotypic moth genus of the family Noctuidae erected by Igor Vasilii Kozhanchikov in 1950. Its only species, Belciades niveola, was first described by Victor Motschulsky in 1866. It is found in Korea and Japan.
