= Collita vetusta =

Scientific classification
- Kingdom: Animalia
- Phylum: Arthropoda
- Class: Insecta
- Order: Lepidoptera
- Superfamily: Noctuoidea
- Family: Erebidae
- Subfamily: Arctiinae
- Genus: Collita
- Species: C. vetusta

Binomial name
- Collita vetusta (Walker, 1854)

Synonyms
- Lithosia vetusta Walker, 1854; Lithosia griseola var. amurensis Staudinger, 1892; Lithosia aegrota Butler, 1877; Lithosia adaucta Butler, 1877

Species of moth

Collita vetusta is a moth of the family Erebidae. It is found in Japan (Hokkaido, Honshu, Shikoku, Kyushu, Yakushima), the Russian Far East, northern China and Korea.

The wingspan is 33–38 mm.

== Subspecies ==
- Collita vetusta vetusta (Russian Far East, northern China and Korea)
- Collita vetusta aegrota (Butler, 1877) (Japan)
