= Catocala abamita =

Scientific classification
- Kingdom: Animalia
- Phylum: Arthropoda
- Class: Insecta
- Order: Lepidoptera
- Superfamily: Noctuoidea
- Family: Erebidae
- Genus: Catocala
- Species: C. abamita

Binomial name
- Catocala abamita Bremer & Grey, 1853

Synonyms
- Catocala scortum Christoph, 1893

Species of moth

Catocala abamita is a moth of the family Erebidae. It is found in Northern China, South-eastern Siberia and on the Korean Peninsula.

The wingspan is about 79 mm.
