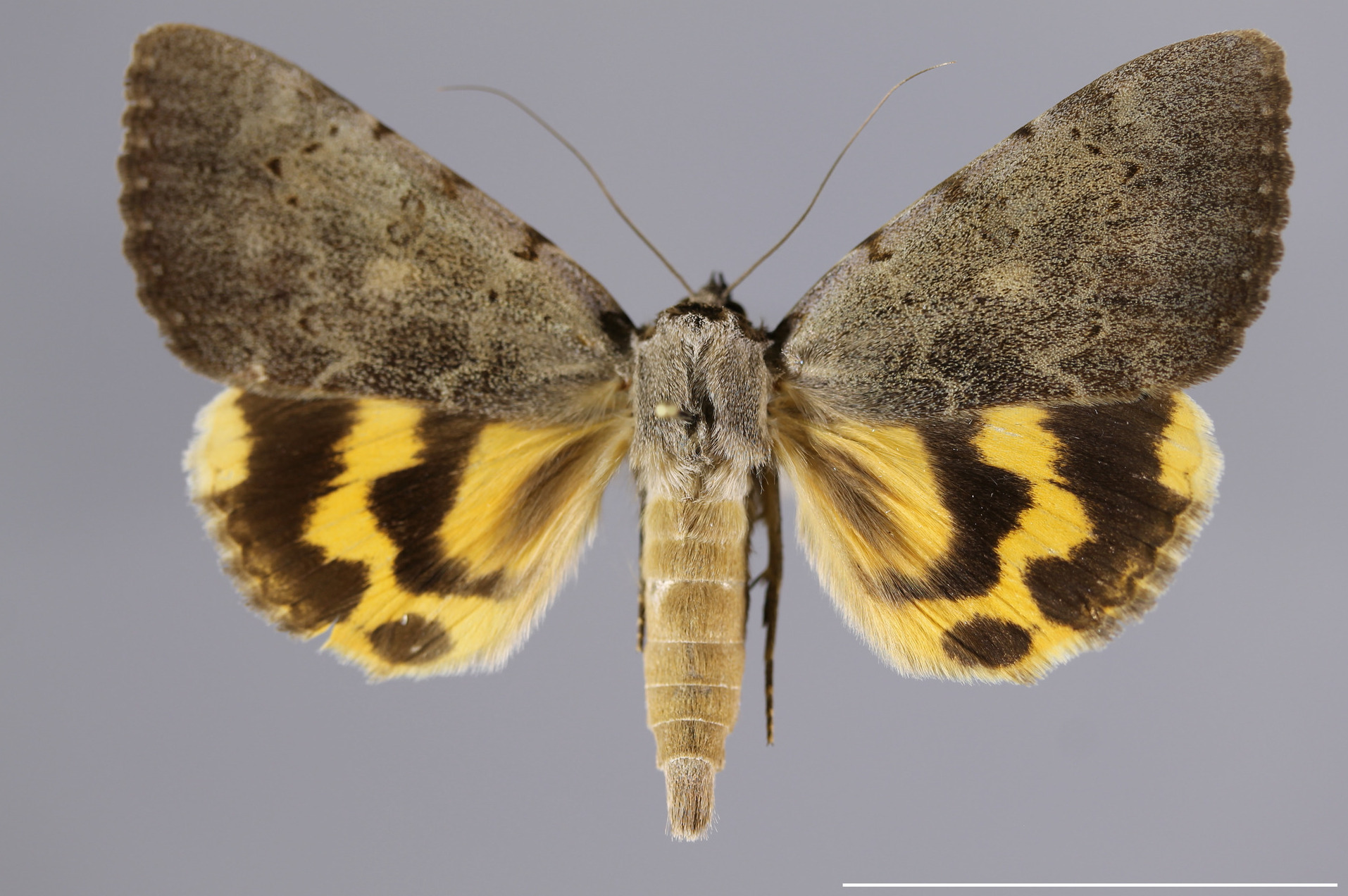

Scientific classification
- Kingdom: Animalia
- Phylum: Arthropoda
- Class: Insecta
- Order: Lepidoptera
- Superfamily: Noctuoidea
- Family: Erebidae
- Genus: Catocala
- Species: C. obscena

Binomial name
- Catocala obscena Alphéraky, 1879

= Catocala obscena =

Species of moth

Catocala obscena is a moth in the family Erebidae first described by Sergei Alphéraky in 1879. It is found in Korea and China.

== Subspecies ==
- Catocala obscena obscena
- Catocala obscena baihi Ishizuka, 2003 (China: Shaanxi)
- Catocala obscena bukeihi Ishizuka, 2003 (China: Yunnan)
