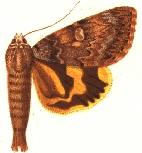

Scientific classification
- Kingdom: Animalia
- Phylum: Arthropoda
- Class: Insecta
- Order: Lepidoptera
- Superfamily: Noctuoidea
- Family: Erebidae
- Genus: Catocala
- Species: C. nubila

Binomial name
- Catocala nubila Butler, 1881

Synonyms
- Ephesia nubila

= Catocala nubila =

Species of moth

Catocala nubila is a moth of the family Erebidae. It is found in Japan, the far east of Russia and Korea.

The wingspan is 27–28 mm.

The larvae feed on the leaves of Fagus.
