= Catocala bokhaica =

Scientific classification
- Kingdom: Animalia
- Phylum: Arthropoda
- Class: Insecta
- Order: Lepidoptera
- Superfamily: Noctuoidea
- Family: Erebidae
- Genus: Catocala
- Species: C. bokhaica

Binomial name
- Catocala bokhaica (Kononenko, 1979)

Synonyms
- Koraia bokhaica Kononenko 1979

Species of moth

Catocala bokhaica is a moth of the family Erebidae first described by Vladimir S. Kononenko in 1979. It is found in Primorye in the Russian Far East, North Korea and China.
