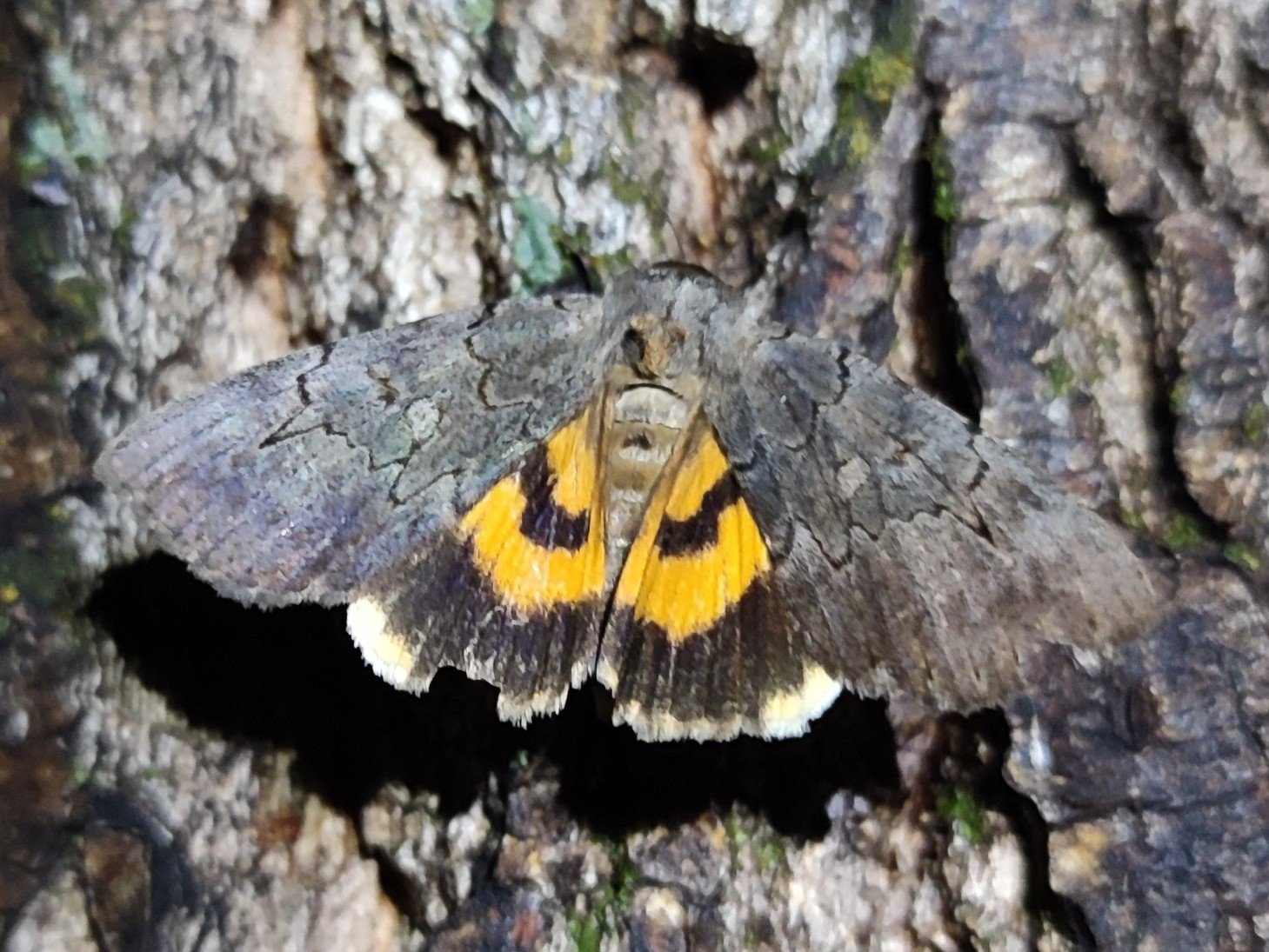

Scientific classification
- Kingdom: Animalia
- Phylum: Arthropoda
- Clade: Pancrustacea
- Class: Insecta
- Order: Lepidoptera
- Superfamily: Noctuoidea
- Family: Erebidae
- Genus: Catocala
- Species: C. bella

Binomial name
- Catocala bella Butler, 1877

Synonyms
- Catocala serenides Staudinger, 1888

= Catocala bella =

Species of moth

Catocala bella is a species of moth in the family Erebidae that was first described by Arthur Gardiner Butler in 1877. It is found in eastern Russia (Siberia, Primorye, Khabarovsk, Southern Amur), Korea, China and Japan (Hokkaido, Honshu).

The wingspan is about 59 mm.
