= Catocala danilovi =

Scientific classification
- Kingdom: Animalia
- Phylum: Arthropoda
- Class: Insecta
- Order: Lepidoptera
- Superfamily: Noctuoidea
- Family: Erebidae
- Genus: Catocala
- Species: C. danilovi

Binomial name
- Catocala danilovi (O. Bang-Haas, 1927)

Synonyms
- Ephesia danilovi Bang-Haas, 1927

Species of moth

Catocala danilovi is a moth in the family Erebidae first described by Otto Bang-Haas in 1927. It is found in south-eastern Siberia.
