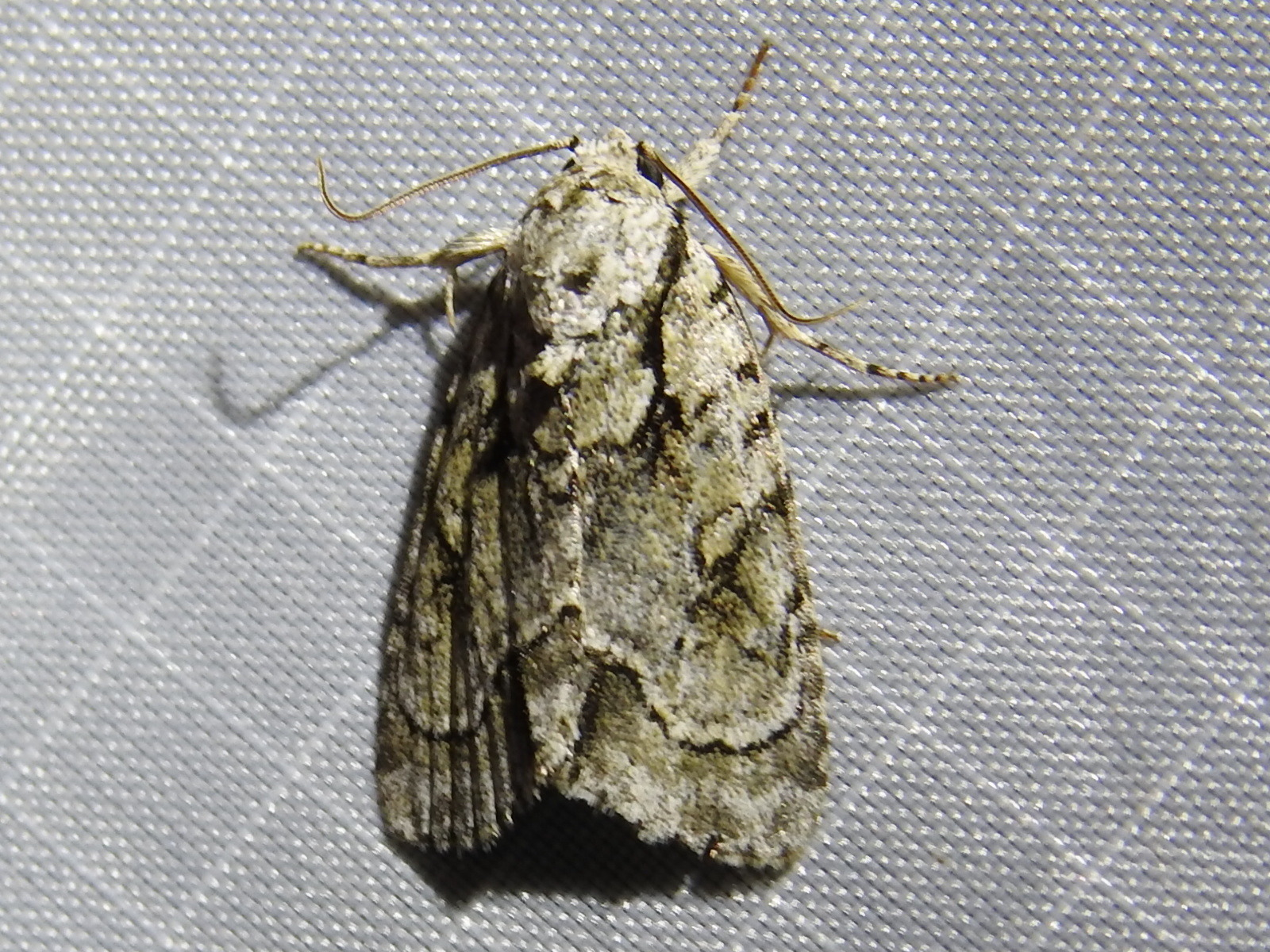
- Acronicta vinnula paupercula, Texas

Scientific classification
- Domain: Eukaryota
- Kingdom: Animalia
- Phylum: Arthropoda
- Class: Insecta
- Order: Lepidoptera
- Superfamily: Noctuoidea
- Family: Noctuidae
- Genus: Acronicta
- Species: A. vinnula

Binomial name
- Acronicta vinnula Grote, 1864

Synonyms
- Acronicta vimmula

= Acronicta vinnula =

Species of moth

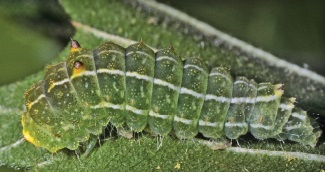
Larva

Acronicta vinnula, the delightful dagger moth, is a moth of the family Noctuidae. It is found from Nova Scotia to Florida, west to Texas, north to Wisconsin and Ontario.

The wingspan is 28–32 mm. Adults are on wing from April to August depending on the location. There are at least two generations per year.

The larvae feed on the leaves of elm.

== Subspecies ==
These subspecies belong to the species Acronicta vinnula:

- Acronicta vinnula vinnula
- Acronicta vinnula paupercula Grote, 1874
- Acronicta vinnula floridensis
