= Acronicta othello =

Scientific classification
- Kingdom: Animalia
- Phylum: Arthropoda
- Clade: Pancrustacea
- Class: Insecta
- Order: Lepidoptera
- Superfamily: Noctuoidea
- Family: Noctuidae
- Genus: Acronicta
- Species: A. othello

Binomial name
- Acronicta othello Smith, 1908

Species of moth

Acronicta othello is a moth of the family Noctuidae. It is found in North America, including California.
