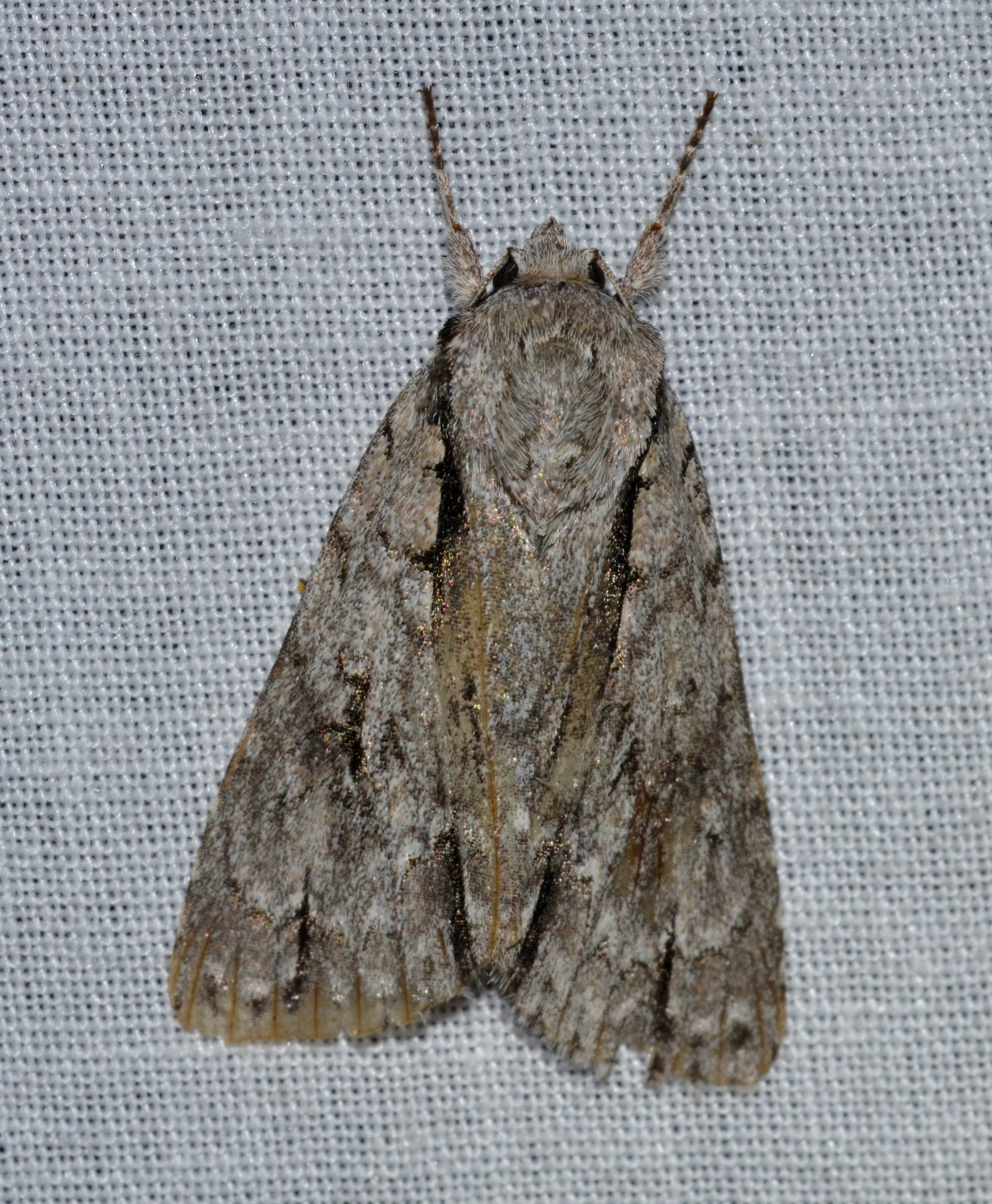

Scientific classification
- Kingdom: Animalia
- Phylum: Arthropoda
- Clade: Pancrustacea
- Class: Insecta
- Order: Lepidoptera
- Superfamily: Noctuoidea
- Family: Noctuidae
- Genus: Acronicta
- Species: A. hasta

Binomial name
- Acronicta hasta Guenée, 1852

Synonyms
- Acronicta furcifera Guenée, 1852

= Acronicta hasta =

Species of moth

Acronicta hasta, the forked dagger moth, speared dagger moth, cherry dagger moth or dart dagger moth, is a moth of the family Noctuidae. The species was first described by Achille Guenée in 1852. It is found in North America in the eastern deciduous woodlands, ranging west across southern Saskatchewan and Alberta into central southern British Columbia, south to Tennessee, Wisconsin and Kansas.

Acronicta furcifera was considered a separate species until 1998, but is now considered a synonym.

The wingspan is 35–45 mm. Adults are on wing from April to September depending on the location. There are two or more generations per year in the south and one or two in the north.

The larvae feed on cherry, oak and plum.

== Subspecies ==
- Acronicta hasta hasta
- Acronicta hasta telum
- Acronicta hasta manitoba (Western Canada)
