= Acronicta subornata =

Scientific classification
- Kingdom: Animalia
- Phylum: Arthropoda
- Clade: Pancrustacea
- Class: Insecta
- Order: Lepidoptera
- Superfamily: Noctuoidea
- Family: Noctuidae
- Genus: Acronicta
- Species: A. subornata

Binomial name
- Acronicta subornata Leech, 1889

Synonyms
- Acronicta brunnea Hampson

Species of moth

Acronicta subornata is a moth of the family Noctuidae. It was described in 1889 by John Henry Leech with a type locality of Yokohama, Japan. The species is found in the Korean Peninsula and Japan (Honshu).

The larvae feed on Quercus.
