= Acronicta lepetita =

Scientific classification
- Kingdom: Animalia
- Phylum: Arthropoda
- Clade: Pancrustacea
- Class: Insecta
- Order: Lepidoptera
- Superfamily: Noctuoidea
- Family: Noctuidae
- Genus: Acronicta
- Species: A. lepetita

Binomial name
- Acronicta lepetita Smith, 1908

Synonyms
- Acronycta lepitita Smith, 1908

Species of moth

Acronicta lepetita is a moth of the family Noctuidae. It is found in North America, including Texas.
