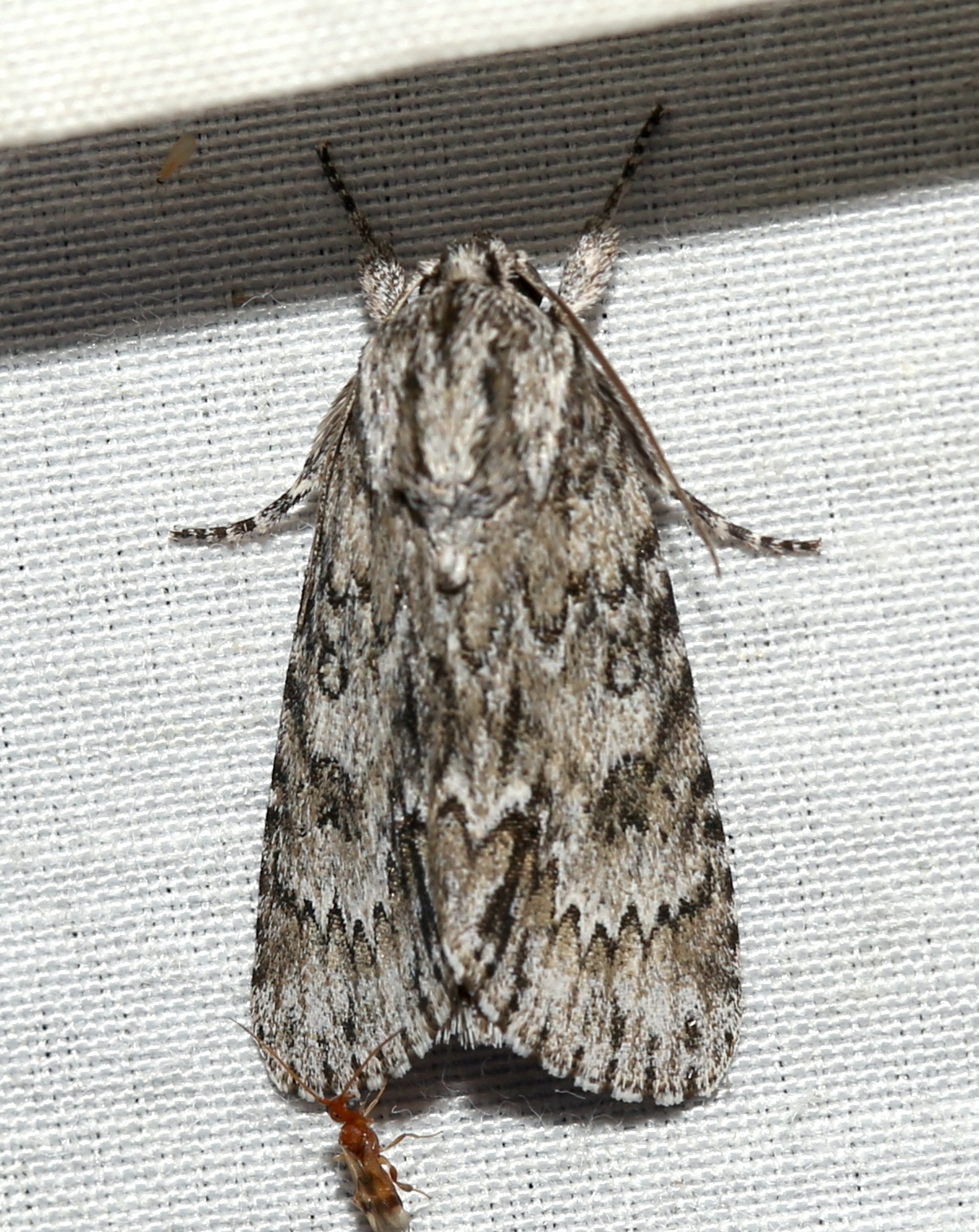

Scientific classification
- Kingdom: Animalia
- Phylum: Arthropoda
- Clade: Pancrustacea
- Class: Insecta
- Order: Lepidoptera
- Superfamily: Noctuoidea
- Family: Noctuidae
- Genus: Acronicta
- Species: A. longa

Binomial name
- Acronicta longa Guenée, 1852

Synonyms
- Acronicta xylinoides; Acronicta xyliniformis; Acronicta pallidicoma

= Acronicta longa =

Species of moth

Acronicta longa, the long-winged dagger moth, is a moth of the family Noctuidae. The species was first described by Achille Guenée in 1852. It is found across much of North America, with Nova Scotia, Alberta, Florida, and Texas within is range.

The wingspan is 32–44 mm.

The larvae feed on birch, blackberry, oak and willow.
