= Acronicta atristrigatus =

Scientific classification
- Kingdom: Animalia
- Phylum: Arthropoda
- Clade: Pancrustacea
- Class: Insecta
- Order: Lepidoptera
- Superfamily: Noctuoidea
- Family: Noctuidae
- Genus: Acronicta
- Species: A. atristrigatus

Binomial name
- Acronicta atristrigatus (Smith, 1900)

Species of moth

Acronicta atristrigatus is a species of moth in the family Noctuidae (the owlet moths).

The MONA or Hodges number for Acronicta atristrigatus is 9232.
