= Acronicta barnesii =

Scientific classification
- Kingdom: Animalia
- Phylum: Arthropoda
- Clade: Pancrustacea
- Class: Insecta
- Order: Lepidoptera
- Superfamily: Noctuoidea
- Family: Noctuidae
- Genus: Acronicta
- Species: A. barnesii

Binomial name
- Acronicta barnesii Smith, 1897

Species of moth

Acronicta barnesii is a moth of the family Noctuidae. It is found in North America.

The wingspan is about 40 mm.
