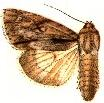

Scientific classification
- Kingdom: Animalia
- Phylum: Arthropoda
- Clade: Pancrustacea
- Class: Insecta
- Order: Lepidoptera
- Superfamily: Noctuoidea
- Family: Noctuidae
- Genus: Acronicta
- Species: A. thoracica

Binomial name
- Acronicta thoracica (Grote, 1880)

= Acronicta thoracica =

Species of moth

Acronicta thoracica is a moth of the family Noctuidae. It is found in western North America.

The wingspan is about 38 mm.
