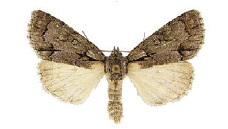

Scientific classification
- Kingdom: Animalia
- Phylum: Arthropoda
- Clade: Pancrustacea
- Class: Insecta
- Order: Lepidoptera
- Superfamily: Noctuoidea
- Family: Noctuidae
- Genus: Acronicta
- Species: A. grisea

Binomial name
- Acronicta grisea Walker, 1856

Synonyms
- Acronicta pudorata; Acronicta tartarea Smith, 1903

= Acronicta grisea =

Species of moth

Acronicta grisea, the gray dagger, is a moth of the family Noctuidae. The species was first described by Francis Walker in 1856. It is found from the Atlantic to the Pacific coast in southern Canada and the northern United States.

The wingspan is 30–40 mm. Adults are on wing in midsummer.

== Subspecies ==
- Acronicta grisea grisea
- Acronicta grisea revellata
