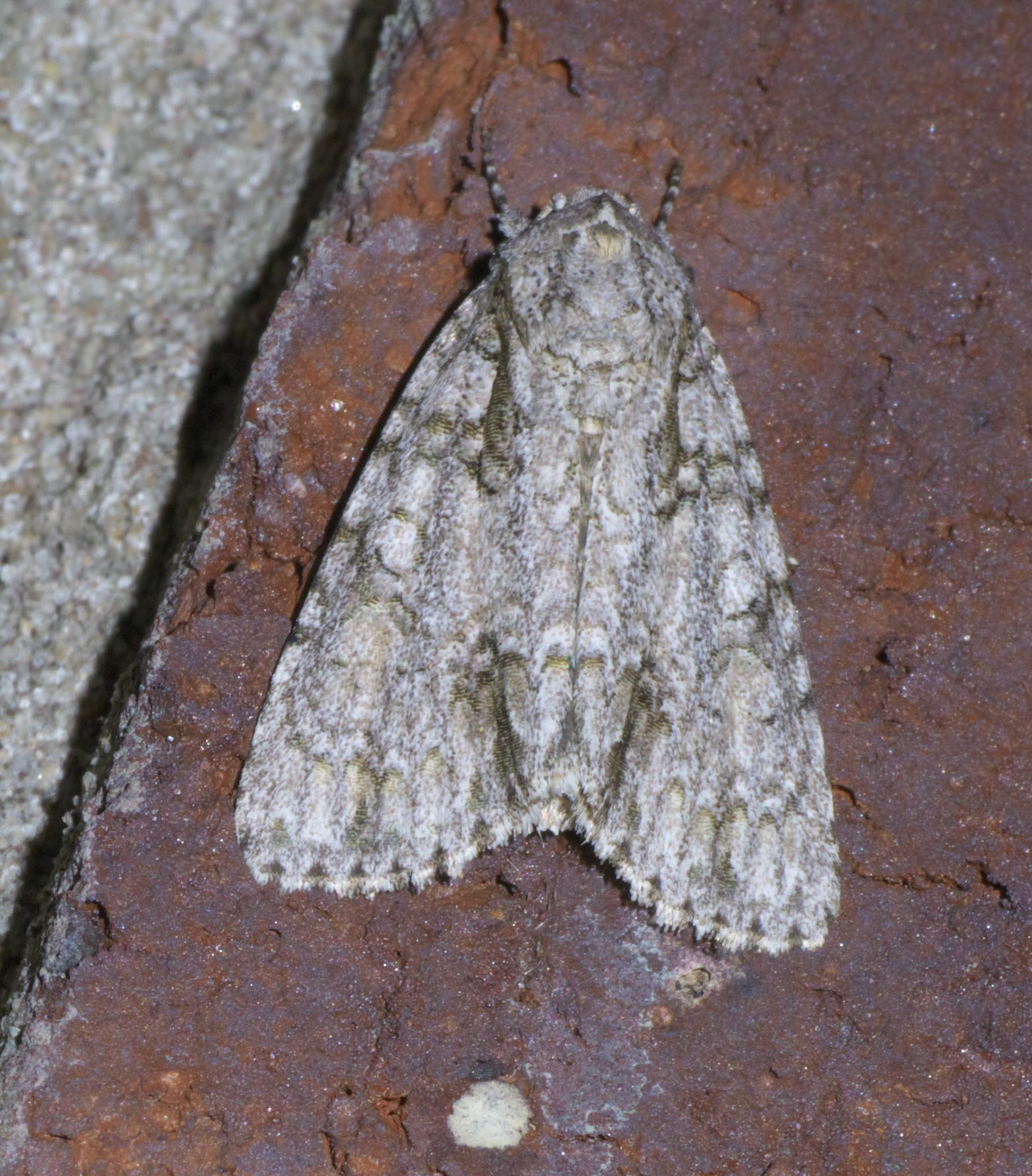

Scientific classification
- Kingdom: Animalia
- Phylum: Arthropoda
- Clade: Pancrustacea
- Class: Insecta
- Order: Lepidoptera
- Superfamily: Noctuoidea
- Family: Noctuidae
- Genus: Acronicta
- Species: A. clarescens

Binomial name
- Acronicta clarescens Guenée, 1852

Synonyms
- Acronicta centriferruginea; Acronicta pruni Harris, 1869

= Acronicta clarescens =

Species of moth

Acronicta clarescens, commonly known as the clear dagger moth, is a species of moth in the family Noctuidae. It is found in North America.

The wingspan is about 40 mm. Adults are on wing from May to August depending on the location.

The larvae feed on apple, cherry, mountain ash, plum and wild black cherry.
