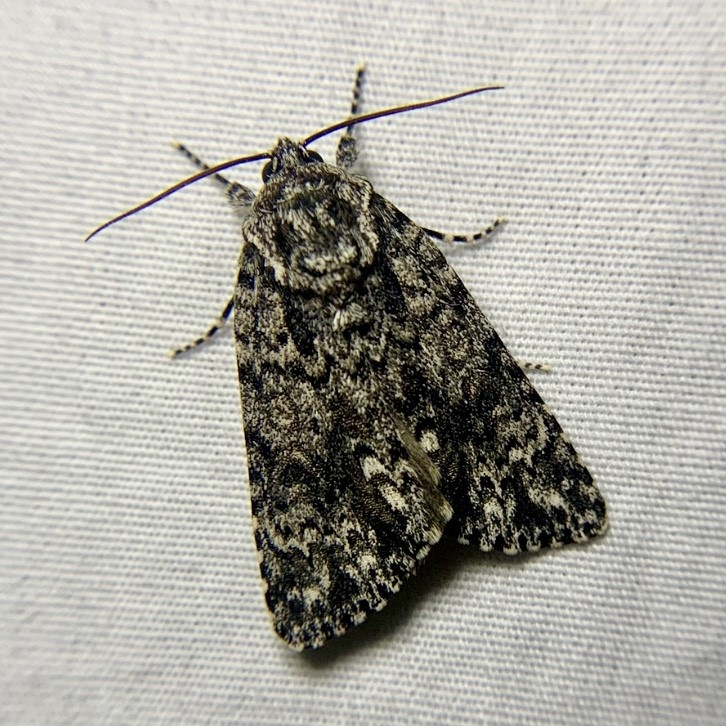

Scientific classification
- Kingdom: Animalia
- Phylum: Arthropoda
- Clade: Pancrustacea
- Class: Insecta
- Order: Lepidoptera
- Superfamily: Noctuoidea
- Family: Noctuidae
- Genus: Acronicta
- Species: A. noctivaga

Binomial name
- Acronicta noctivaga Grote, 1864

= Acronicta noctivaga =

Species of moth

Acronicta noctivaga, the night-wandering dagger moth, is a species of moth in the family Noctuidae. It is found in north-eastern North America including Wisconsin, New York, Maryland and Ontario.

The wingspan is about 32 mm. Adults are on wing from May to August depending on the location.

Recorded food plants include poplar.
