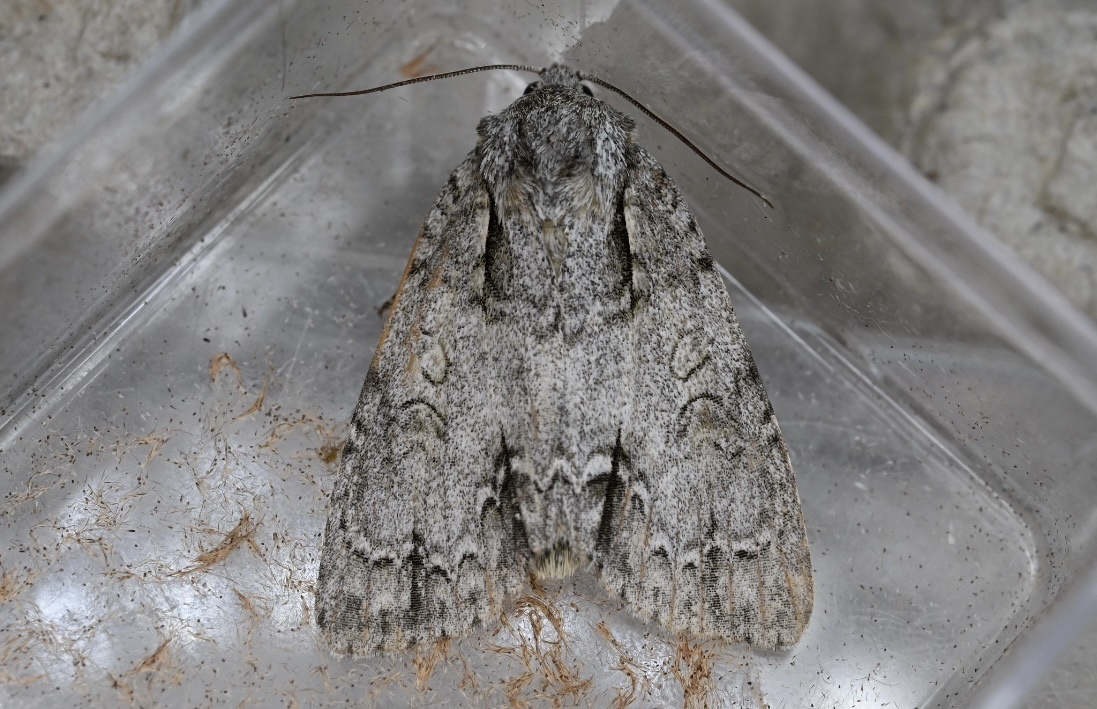

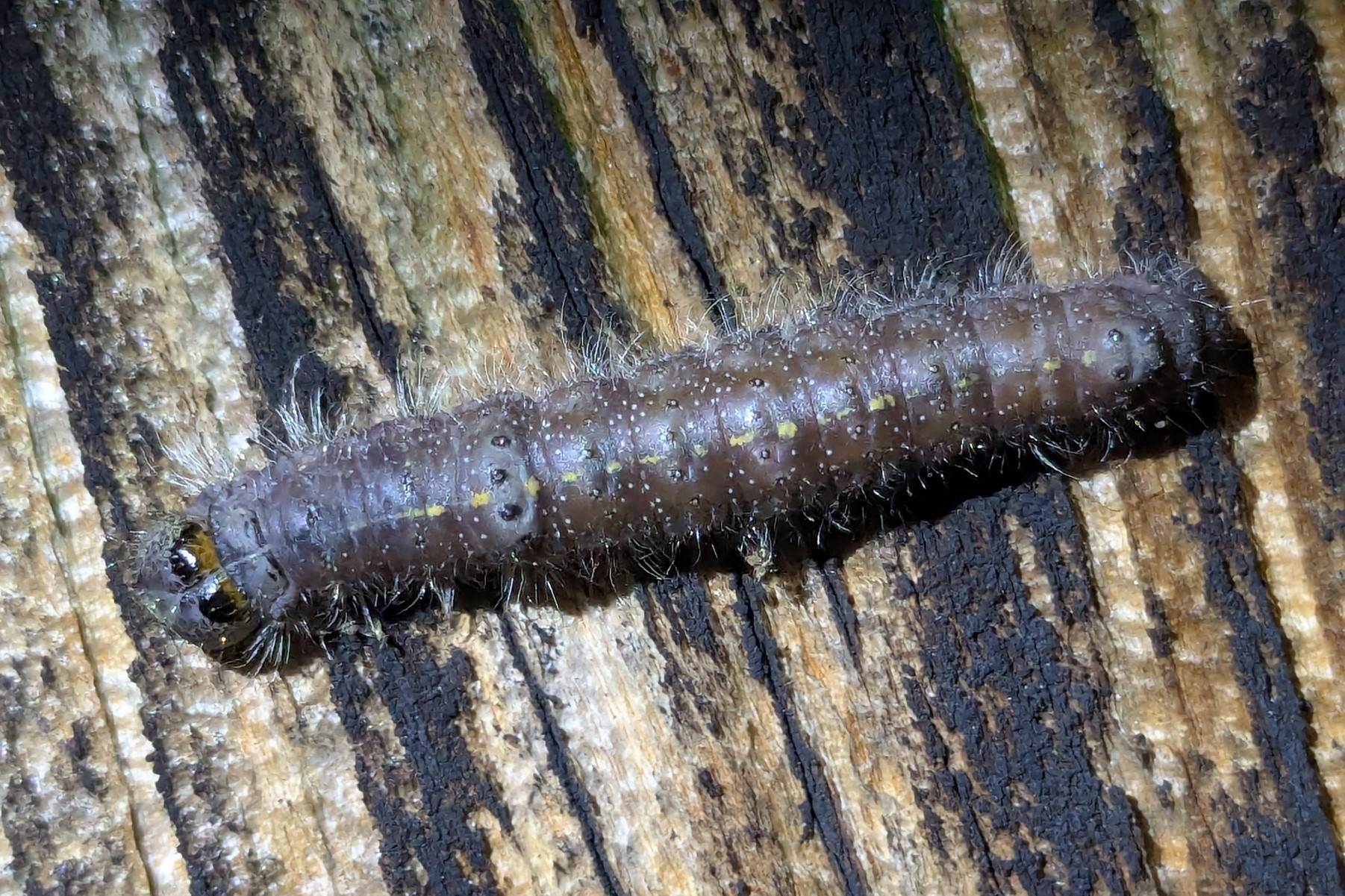
- Adult (top) and larva (bottom)

Scientific classification
- Kingdom: Animalia
- Phylum: Arthropoda
- Clade: Pancrustacea
- Class: Insecta
- Order: Lepidoptera
- Superfamily: Noctuoidea
- Family: Noctuidae
- Genus: Acronicta
- Species: A. spinigera

Binomial name
- Acronicta spinigera Guenée, 1852

Synonyms
- Acronicta harveyana

= Acronicta spinigera =

Species of moth

Acronicta spinigera, the nondescript dagger moth, is a species of moth in the family Noctuidae. It is found in south-eastern Canada (Quebec and Ontario) and the eastern United States.

The wingspan is about 40 mm. Adults are in flight from May to July in the northern part of the range and from April to September in the southern part.
