= Acronicta valliscola =

Scientific classification
- Domain: Eukaryota
- Kingdom: Animalia
- Phylum: Arthropoda
- Class: Insecta
- Order: Lepidoptera
- Superfamily: Noctuoidea
- Family: Noctuidae
- Genus: Acronicta
- Species: A. valliscola

Binomial name
- Acronicta valliscola Blanchard, 1968

Species of moth

Acronicta valliscola is a moth of the family Noctuidae, originally described by André Blanchard in 1968. It is found only in Big Bend National Park in Texas, United States.

Its wingspan is 30–35 mm.
