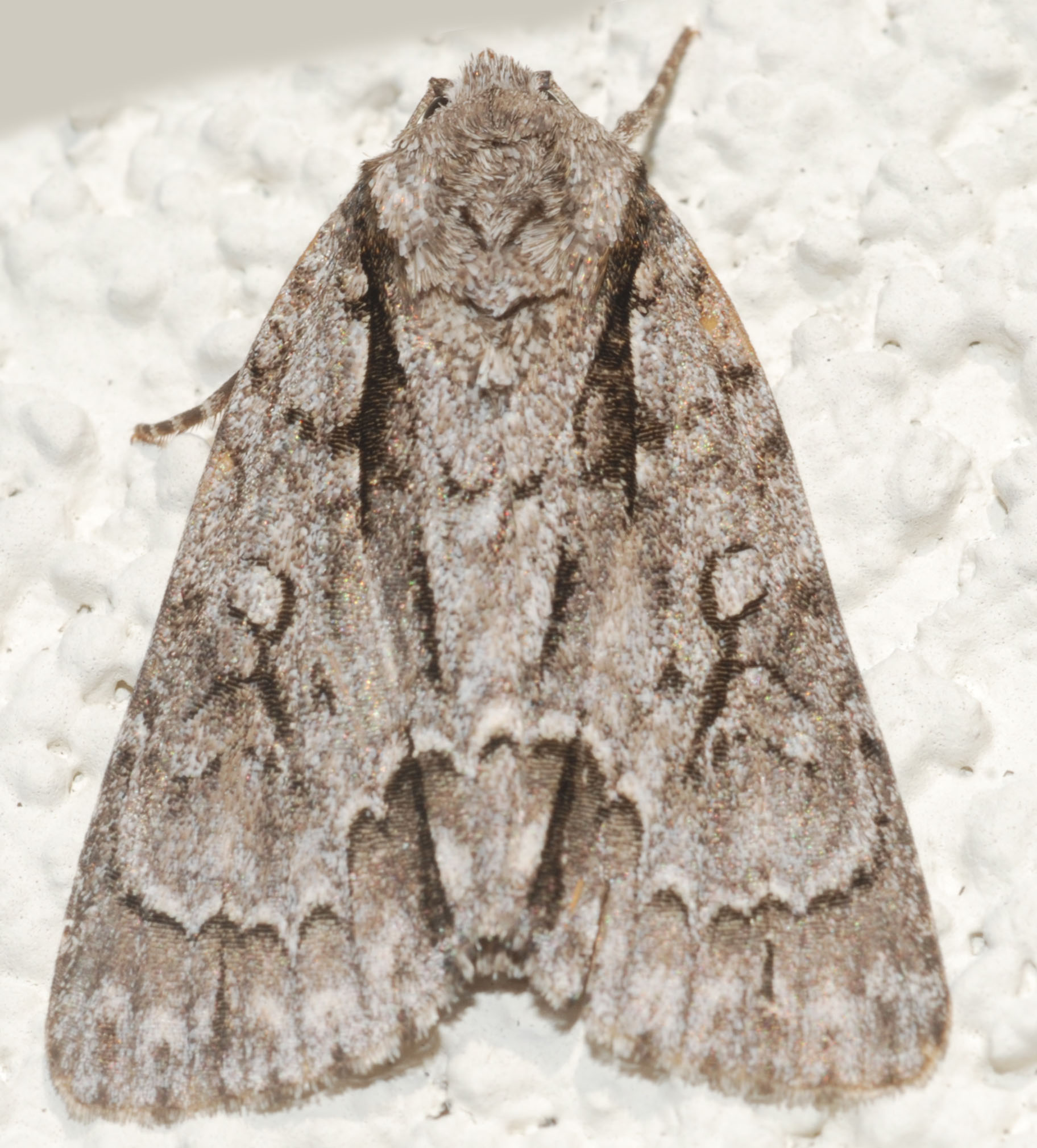
- adult
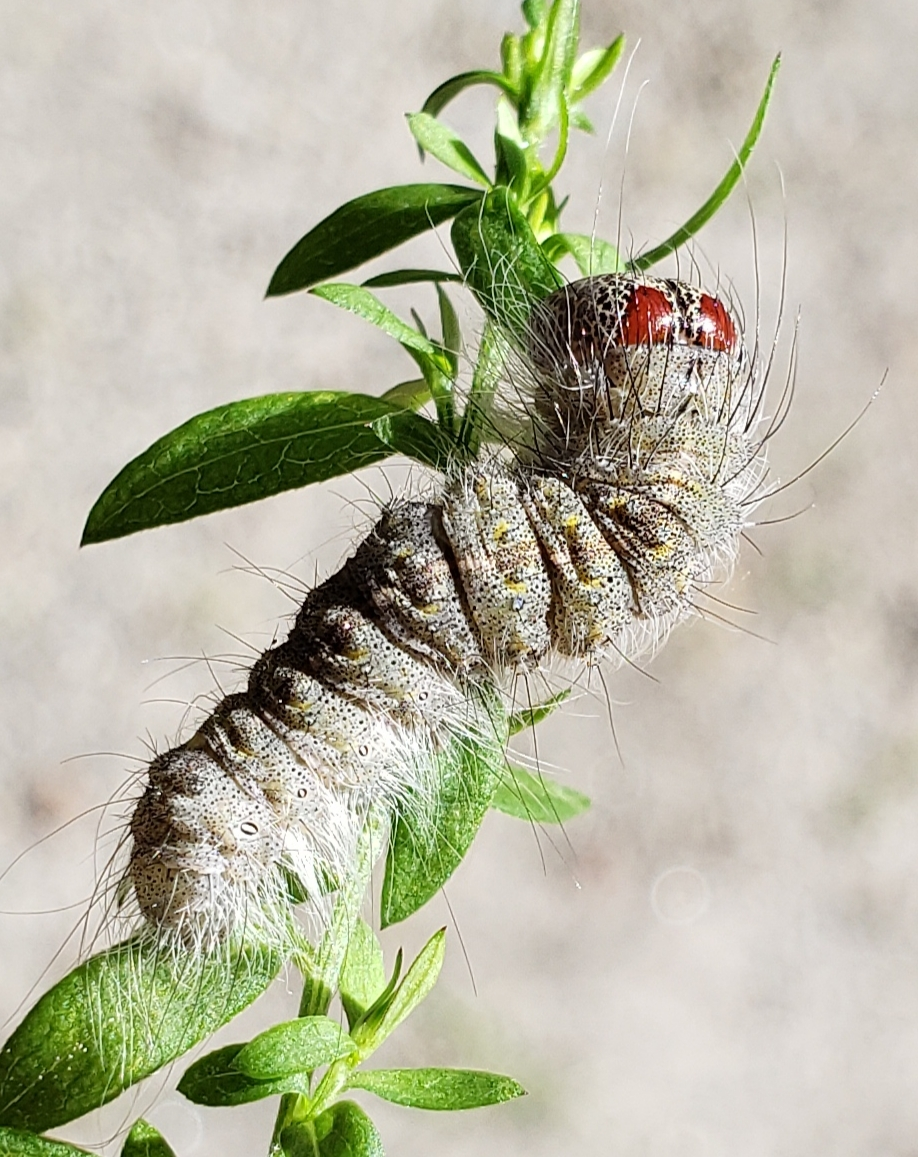
- larva

Scientific classification
- Kingdom: Animalia
- Phylum: Arthropoda
- Clade: Pancrustacea
- Class: Insecta
- Order: Lepidoptera
- Superfamily: Noctuoidea
- Family: Noctuidae
- Genus: Acronicta
- Species: A. lobeliae

Binomial name
- Acronicta lobeliae (Guenée, 1852)

Synonyms
- Acronycta lobeliae Guenée, 1852; Acronycta grotei Butler, 1893

= Acronicta lobeliae =

Species of moth

Acronicta lobeliae, the lobelia dagger moth or greater oak dagger moth, is a moth of the family Noctuidae. The species was first described by Achille Guenée in 1852. It is found in North America.

The larvae feed on Quercus species.
