= Acronicta tiena =

Scientific classification
- Domain: Eukaryota
- Kingdom: Animalia
- Phylum: Arthropoda
- Class: Insecta
- Order: Lepidoptera
- Superfamily: Noctuoidea
- Family: Noctuidae
- Genus: Acronicta
- Species: A. tiena

Binomial name
- Acronicta tiena Püngeler, 1907

Synonyms
- Acronycta tiena Pungeler, 1907

Species of moth

Acronicta tiena is a moth of the family Noctuidae. It is found in western China.
