= Acronicta extricata =

Scientific classification
- Kingdom: Animalia
- Phylum: Arthropoda
- Clade: Pancrustacea
- Class: Insecta
- Order: Lepidoptera
- Superfamily: Noctuoidea
- Family: Noctuidae
- Genus: Acronicta
- Species: A. extricata

Binomial name
- Acronicta extricata Grote, 1882

Species of moth

Acronicta extricata is a moth of the family Noctuidae. It is found in North America, including Texas.
