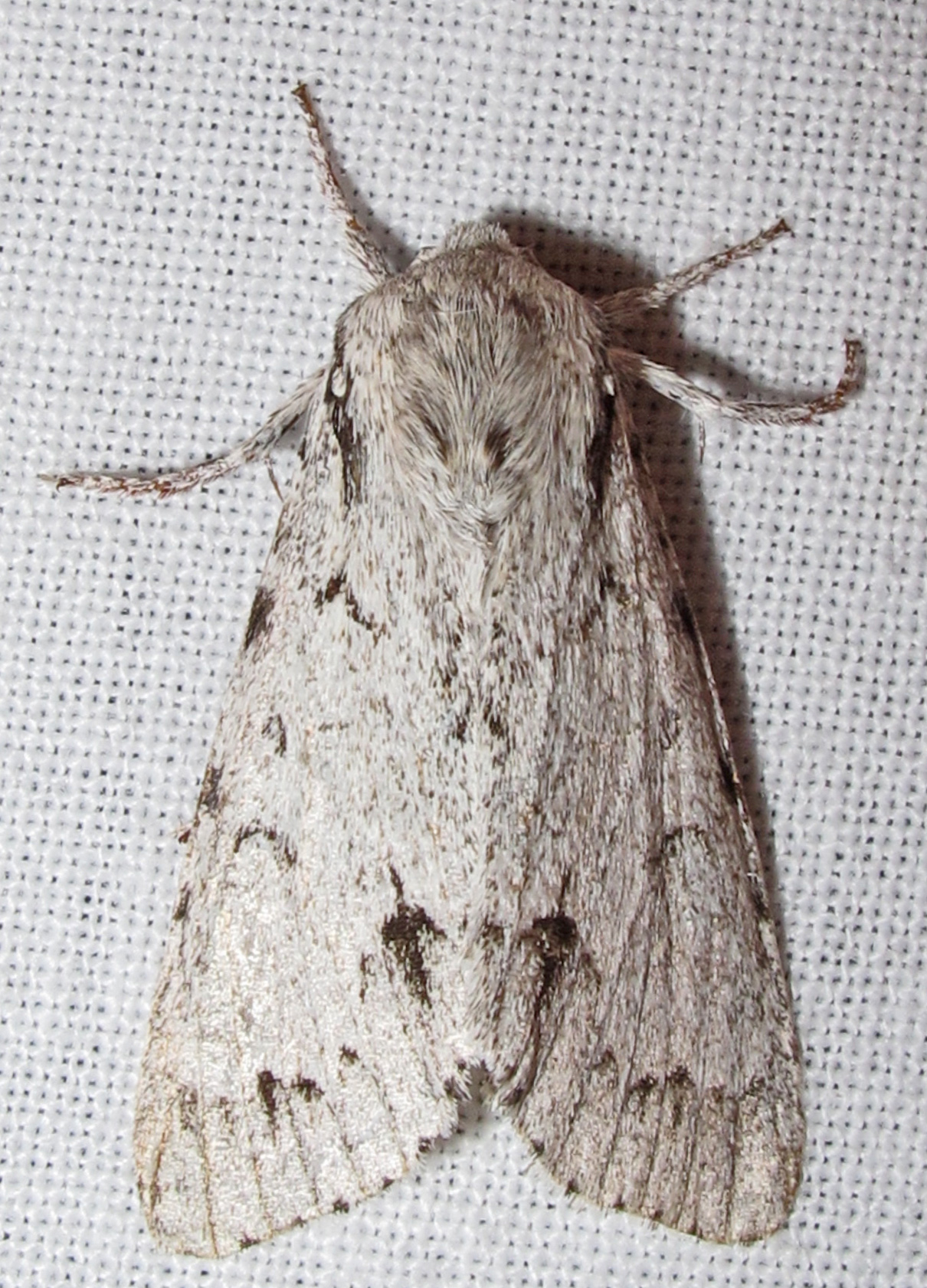

Scientific classification
- Kingdom: Animalia
- Phylum: Arthropoda
- Clade: Pancrustacea
- Class: Insecta
- Order: Lepidoptera
- Superfamily: Noctuoidea
- Family: Noctuidae
- Genus: Acronicta
- Species: A. lepusculina

Binomial name
- Acronicta lepusculina Guenée, 1852

Synonyms
- List: Apatela felina Grote; Acronycta populi Riley; Acronycta frigida Smith; Acronycta cinderella Smith; Acronycta pacifica Smith; Acronycta cretata Smith; Acronycta insita var. canadensis Smith & Dyar; Acronycta similana Smith; Acronycta tonitra Smith; Acronycta cyanescens Hampson; Acronycta chionochroa Hampson; Acronycta amicora Smith; Acronycta metra Smith; Acronycta turpis Smith; Acronycta transversta Smith; Acronita transversta Smith

= Acronicta lepusculina =

Species of moth

Acronicta lepusculina, commonly known as the cottonwood dagger moth, is a species of moth in the family Noctuidae. The species was first described by Achille Guenée in 1852. It is found in most of eastern North America, west through southern Canada to Vancouver Island and southward.

The wingspan is 40–50 mm. Adults are on wing from May to July depending on the location.

The larvae feed on the leaves of Salix, Populus and Betula species.
