= Acronicta psichinesis =

Scientific classification
- Kingdom: Animalia
- Phylum: Arthropoda
- Clade: Pancrustacea
- Class: Insecta
- Order: Lepidoptera
- Superfamily: Noctuoidea
- Family: Noctuidae
- Genus: Acronicta
- Species: A. psichinesis

Binomial name
- Acronicta psichinesis Kononenko & Han, 2008

Species of moth

Acronicta psichinesis is a moth of the family Noctuidae. It is endemic to East China and known Fujian and Jiangsu provinces.

Wingspan is 36 mm (1.4 in) in both male (holotype) and female (paratype). Acronicta psichinesis is similar to Acronicta psi; which species specimens earlier reported as Acronicta psi from central China is unclear.
