= Acronicta leucocuspis =

Scientific classification
- Kingdom: Animalia
- Phylum: Arthropoda
- Clade: Pancrustacea
- Class: Insecta
- Order: Lepidoptera
- Superfamily: Noctuoidea
- Family: Noctuidae
- Genus: Acronicta
- Species: A. leucocuspis

Binomial name
- Acronicta leucocuspis Butler, 1878

Synonyms
- Acronycta leucocuspis Butler 1878; Acronicta sapporensis Matsumura 1878; Acronicta obsuta Draudt 1878

Species of moth

Acronicta leucocuspis is a moth of the family Noctuidae. It is found in the Korean Peninsula, China, Japan (Hokkaido, Honshu, Kyushu) and the Russian Far East (Primorye, southern Khabarovsk and southern Sakhalin).
