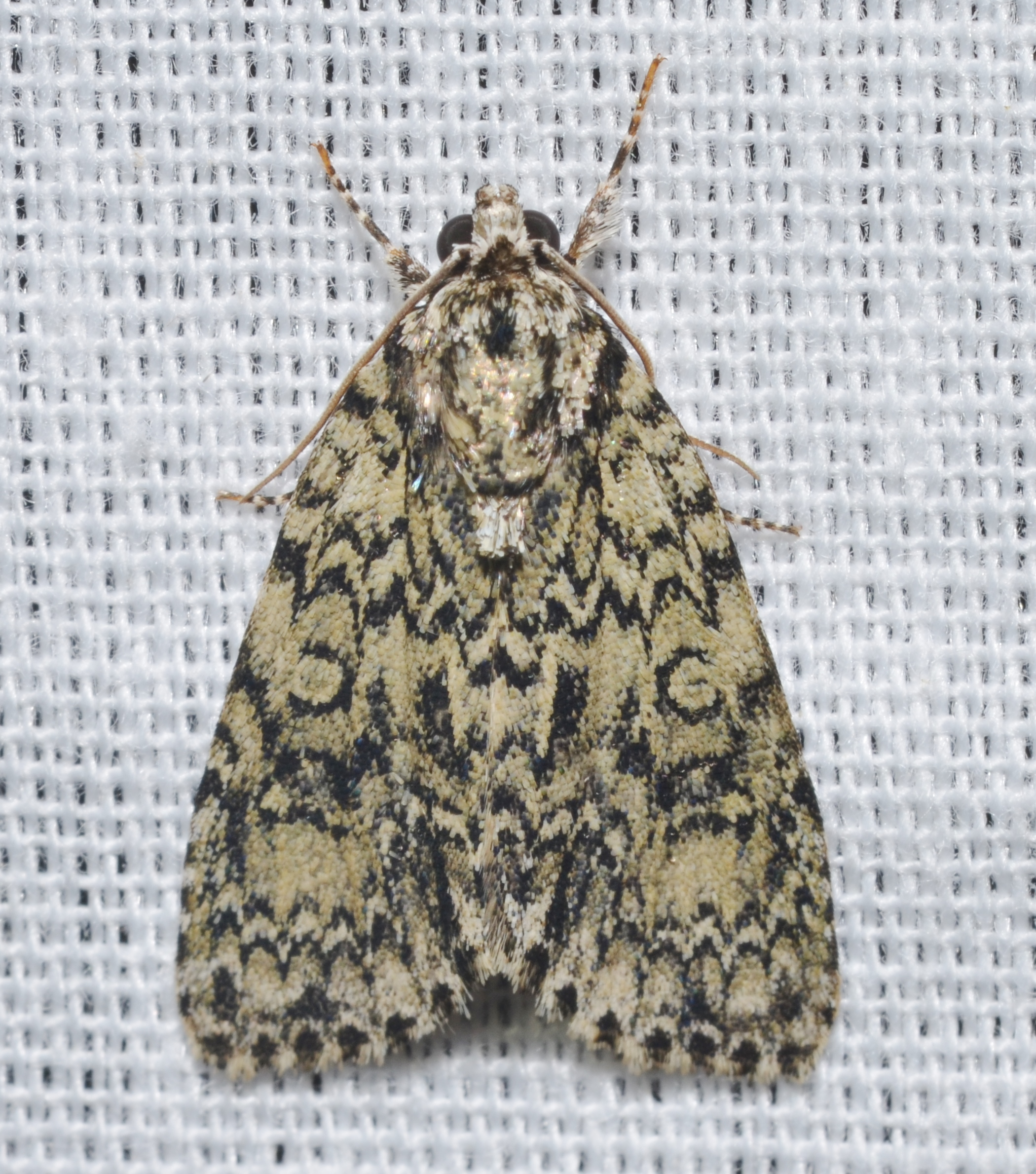

Scientific classification
- Kingdom: Animalia
- Phylum: Arthropoda
- Clade: Pancrustacea
- Class: Insecta
- Order: Lepidoptera
- Superfamily: Noctuoidea
- Family: Noctuidae
- Genus: Acronicta
- Species: A. heitzmani

Binomial name
- Acronicta heitzmani Covell & Metzler, 1992

= Acronicta heitzmani =

Heitzman's dagger moth

Species of moth

Acronicta heitzmani, or Heitzman's dagger moth, is a species of moth in the family Noctuidae. The species was first described by Charles V. Covell and Eric H. Metzler in 1992. It is found in Missouri, Arkansas, Illinois and Ohio.

The length of the forewings is 12–14.5 mm for males and 12.5–15 mm for females.
