= Acronicta pasiphae =

Scientific classification
- Kingdom: Animalia
- Phylum: Arthropoda
- Clade: Pancrustacea
- Class: Insecta
- Order: Lepidoptera
- Superfamily: Noctuoidea
- Family: Noctuidae
- Genus: Acronicta
- Species: A. pasiphae

Binomial name
- Acronicta pasiphae Draudt, 1936

Species of moth

Acronicta pasiphae is a moth of the family Noctuidae. It is found in south-eastern Turkey, Iraq, Iran and Israel.

Adults are on wing from May to September. There are probably two generations per year.
