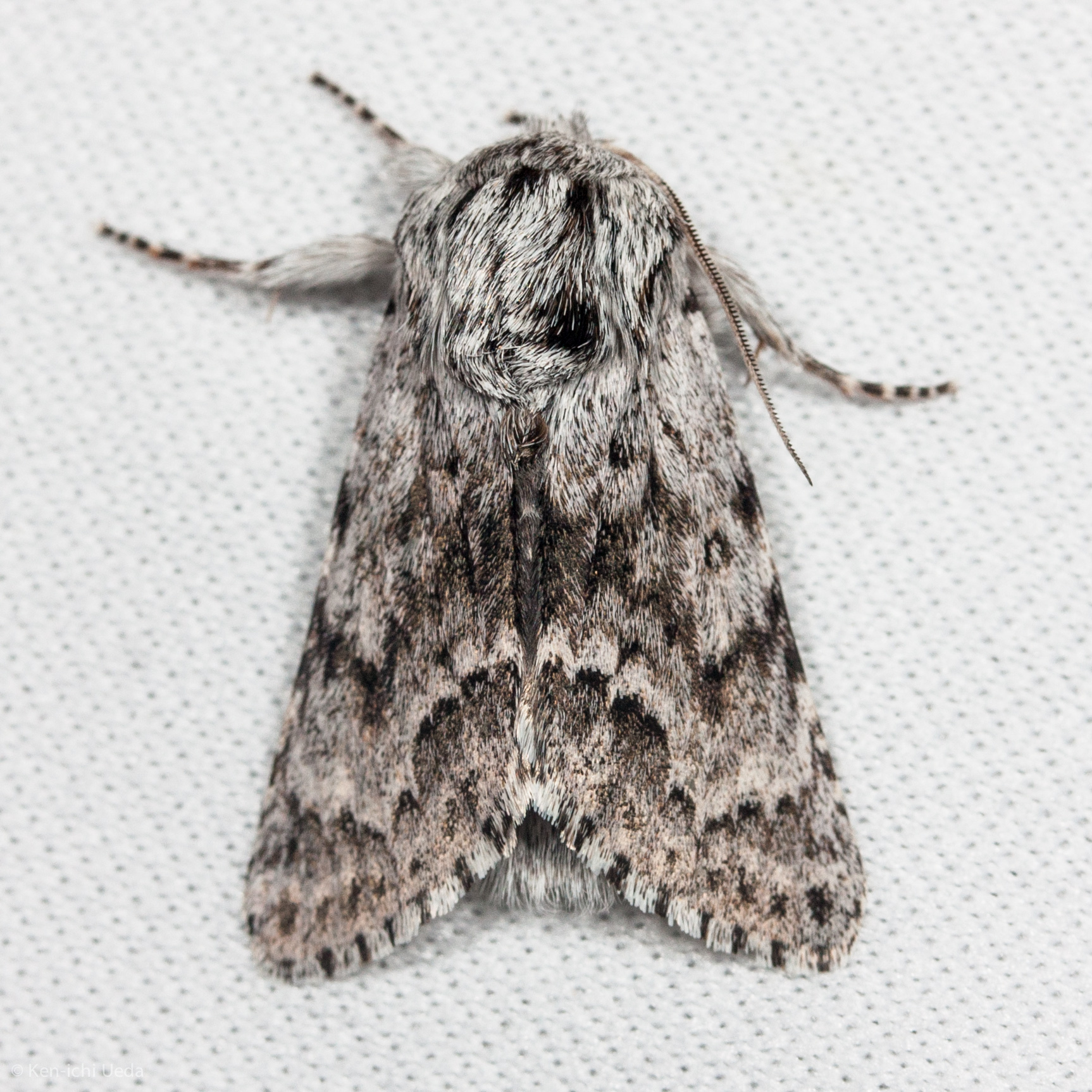

Scientific classification
- Kingdom: Animalia
- Phylum: Arthropoda
- Clade: Pancrustacea
- Class: Insecta
- Order: Lepidoptera
- Superfamily: Noctuoidea
- Family: Noctuidae
- Genus: Acronicta
- Species: A. spinea

Binomial name
- Acronicta spinea (Grote, 1876)

= Acronicta spinea =

Species of moth

Acronicta spinea is a species of moth in the family Noctuidae (the owlet moths).

The MONA or Hodges number for Acronicta spinea is 9276.
