= Acronicta jozana =

Scientific classification
- Kingdom: Animalia
- Phylum: Arthropoda
- Clade: Pancrustacea
- Class: Insecta
- Order: Lepidoptera
- Superfamily: Noctuoidea
- Family: Noctuidae
- Genus: Acronicta
- Species: A. jozana

Binomial name
- Acronicta jozana Matsumura, 1926

Synonyms
- Acronycta jozana Matsumura, 1926

Species of moth

Acronicta jozana is a moth of the family Noctuidae. It is found in the Korean Peninsula, China, Japan (Hokkaido, Honshu) and the Russian Far East (Primorye, southern Khabarovsk, southern Amur region)
