= Acronicta dolli =

Scientific classification
- Kingdom: Animalia
- Phylum: Arthropoda
- Clade: Pancrustacea
- Class: Insecta
- Order: Lepidoptera
- Superfamily: Noctuoidea
- Family: Noctuidae
- Genus: Acronicta
- Species: A. dolli

Binomial name
- Acronicta dolli (Barnes & McDunnough, 1918)

Species of moth

Acronicta dolli, or Doll's dagger moth, is a species of moth in the family Noctuidae (the owlet moths). It was first described by William Barnes and James Halliday McDunnough in 1818 and it is found in North America.

The MONA or Hodges number for Acronicta dolli is 9277.
