= Acronicta dinawa =

Scientific classification
- Kingdom: Animalia
- Phylum: Arthropoda
- Clade: Pancrustacea
- Class: Insecta
- Order: Lepidoptera
- Superfamily: Noctuoidea
- Family: Noctuidae
- Genus: Acronicta
- Species: A. dinawa

Binomial name
- Acronicta dinawa (Bethune-Baker, 1906)

Synonyms
- Acronycta dinawa Bethune-Baker, 1906; Thalatha dinava Hampson, 1909

Species of moth

Acronicta dinawa is a moth of the family Noctuidae. It is found in Queensland and Papua New Guinea.
