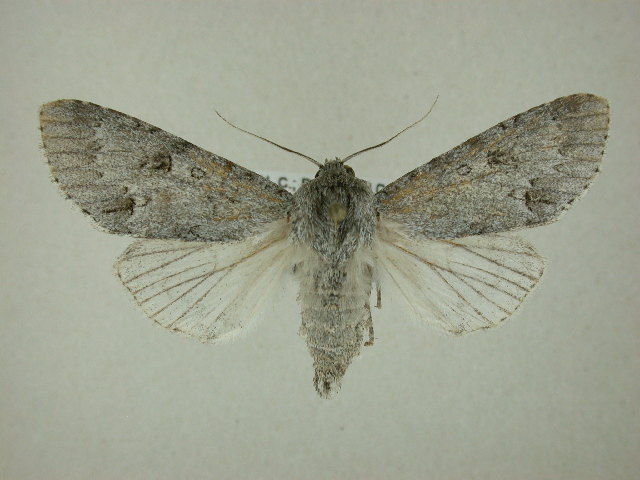

Scientific classification
- Kingdom: Animalia
- Phylum: Arthropoda
- Clade: Pancrustacea
- Class: Insecta
- Order: Lepidoptera
- Superfamily: Noctuoidea
- Family: Noctuidae
- Genus: Acronicta
- Species: A. hastulifera

Binomial name
- Acronicta hastulifera J. E. Smith, 1797

= Acronicta hastulifera =

Species of moth

Acronicta hastulifera, the frosted dagger moth, is a moth of the family Noctuidae. The species was first described by James Edward Smith in 1797. It is found in the north-eastern United States as far south as Virginia, North Carolina, South Carolina and Georgia.

The larvae feed on alder, birch, poplar, willow and other hardwood.
