= Acronicta pulverosa =

Scientific classification
- Kingdom: Animalia
- Phylum: Arthropoda
- Clade: Pancrustacea
- Class: Insecta
- Order: Lepidoptera
- Superfamily: Noctuoidea
- Family: Noctuidae
- Genus: Acronicta
- Species: A. pulverosa

Binomial name
- Acronicta pulverosa (Hampson, 1909)

Synonyms
- Acronycta pulverosa Hampson, 1909

Species of moth

Acronicta pulverosa is a moth of the family Noctuidae. It is found in the Korean Peninsula, China, Japan (Honshu, Shikoku, Kyushu, Tsushima Island, Yakushima Island), and Taiwan. The subspecies Acronicta pulverosa taitungensis is endemic to Taiwan.

The wingspan is 30–35 mm (1.2–1.4 in).
