= Acronicta cyanescens =

Scientific classification
- Kingdom: Animalia
- Phylum: Arthropoda
- Clade: Pancrustacea
- Class: Insecta
- Order: Lepidoptera
- Superfamily: Noctuoidea
- Family: Noctuidae
- Genus: Acronicta
- Species: A. cyanescens

Binomial name
- Acronicta cyanescens Hampson, 1909

Species of moth

Acronicta cyanescens is a moth of the family Noctuidae first described by George Hampson in 1909. It is found in western North America, from extreme south-western Alberta west, and south to New Mexico.

The wingspan is 45–47 mm. Adults are on wing from June to July in one generation depending on the location.
