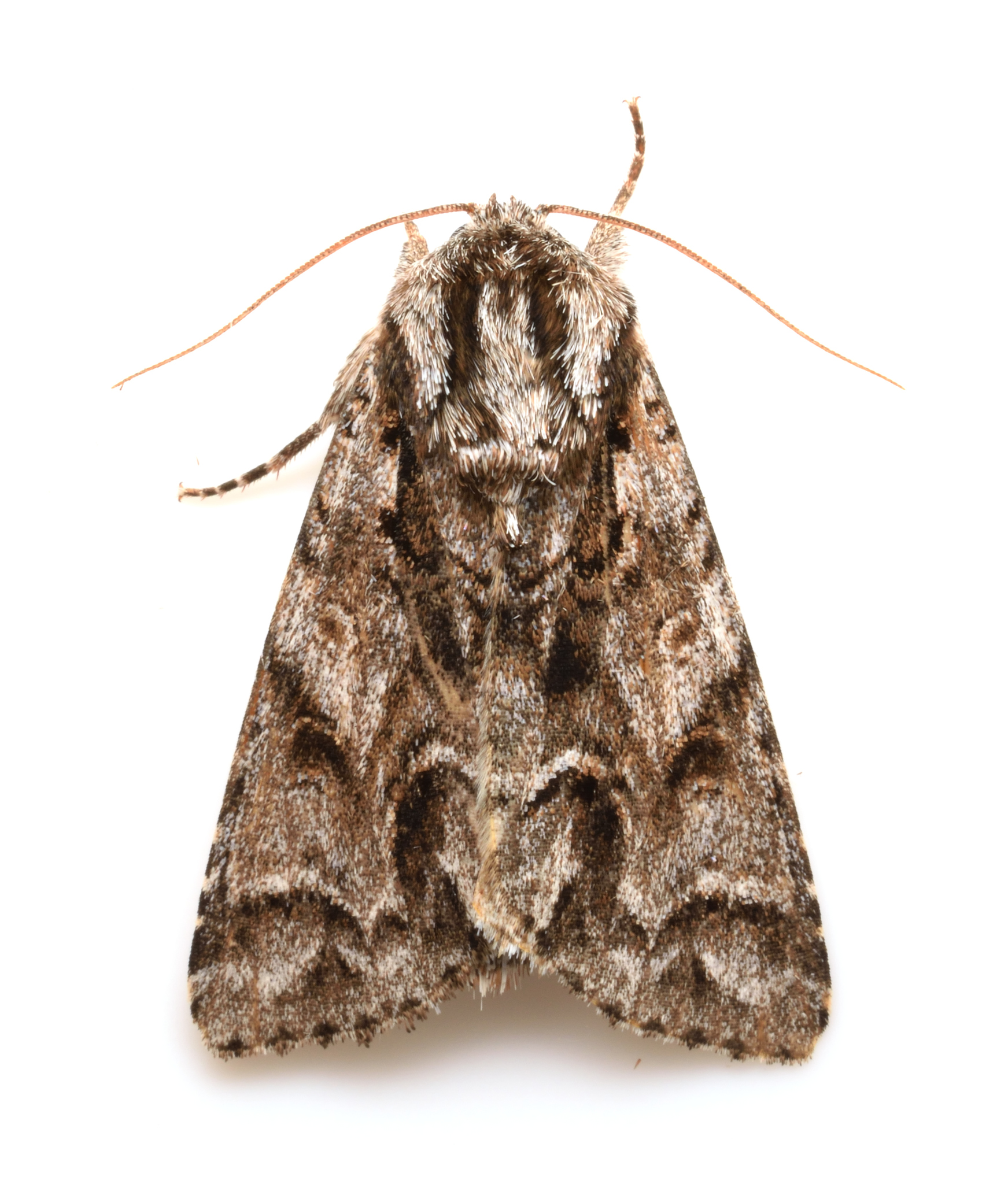

Scientific classification
- Kingdom: Animalia
- Phylum: Arthropoda
- Clade: Pancrustacea
- Class: Insecta
- Order: Lepidoptera
- Superfamily: Noctuoidea
- Family: Noctuidae
- Genus: Acronicta
- Species: A. digna

Binomial name
- Acronicta digna (Butler, 1881)

Synonyms
- Thalpophila digna Butler, 1881; Acronycta michael Oberthur, 1881; Sidemia hoenei Matsumura, 1881

= Acronicta digna =

Species of moth

Acronicta digna is a moth of the family Noctuidae. It is found in the Korean Peninsula, Japan, the Russian Far East, China, and Taiwan.
