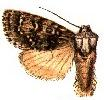

Scientific classification
- Kingdom: Animalia
- Phylum: Arthropoda
- Clade: Pancrustacea
- Class: Insecta
- Order: Lepidoptera
- Superfamily: Noctuoidea
- Family: Noctuidae
- Genus: Acronicta
- Species: A. gastridia

Binomial name
- Acronicta gastridia C. Swinhoe, 1895

Synonyms
- Acronycta gastridia C. Swinhoe, 1895

= Acronicta gastridia =

Species of moth

Acronicta gastridia is a moth of the family Noctuidae first described by Charles Swinhoe in 1895. It is found in Kashmir.
