= Acronicta sagittata =

Scientific classification
- Kingdom: Animalia
- Phylum: Arthropoda
- Clade: Pancrustacea
- Class: Insecta
- Order: Lepidoptera
- Superfamily: Noctuoidea
- Family: Noctuidae
- Genus: Acronicta
- Species: A. sagittata

Binomial name
- Acronicta sagittata McDunnough, 1940

Species of moth

Acronicta sagittata is a moth in the family Noctuidae (the owlet moths). The species was first described by James Halliday McDunnough in 1940. It is found in North America.

The MONA or Hodges number for Acronicta sagittata is 9273.
