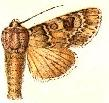

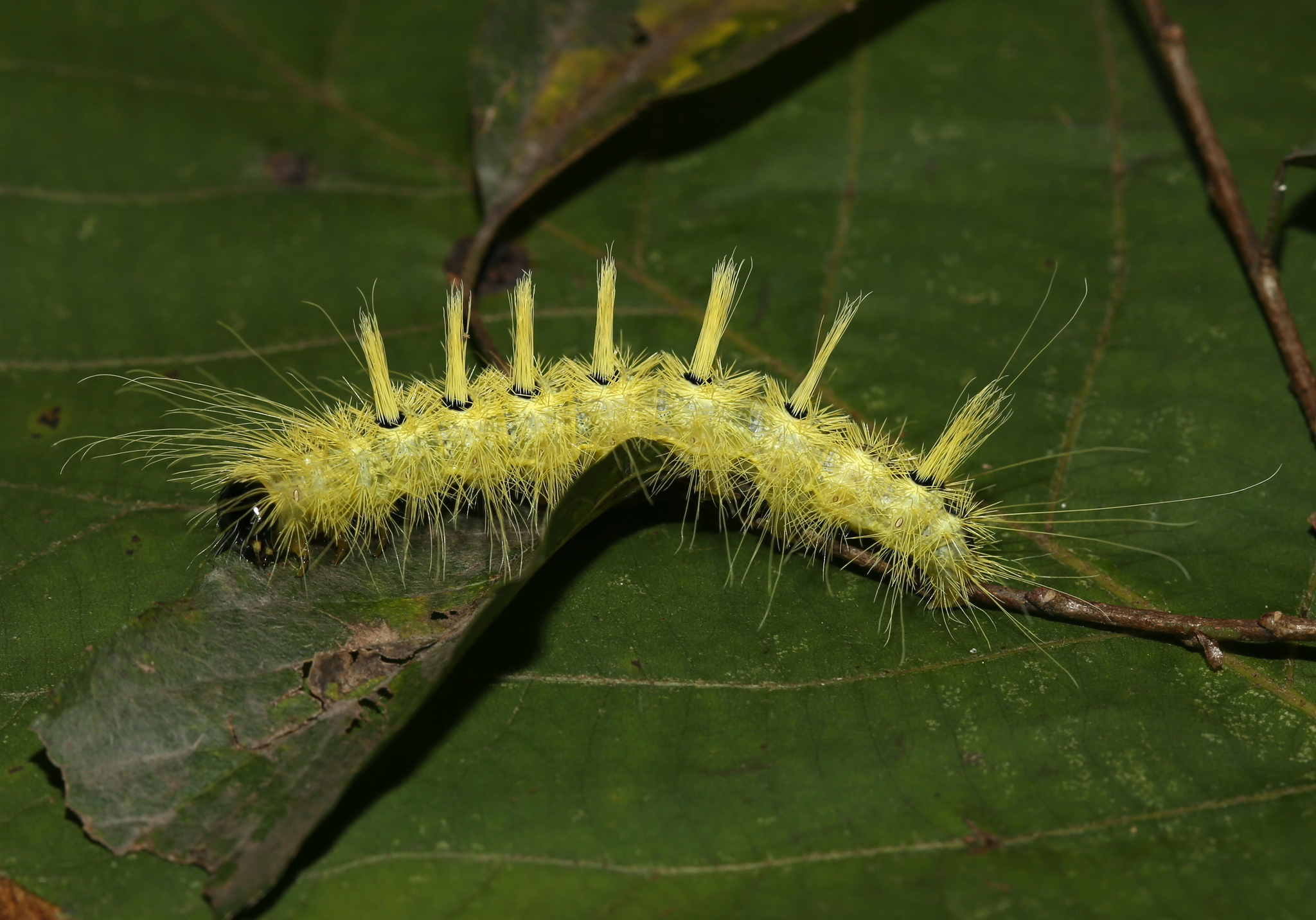
- Larva feeding on Celtis laevigata

Scientific classification
- Kingdom: Animalia
- Phylum: Arthropoda
- Clade: Pancrustacea
- Class: Insecta
- Order: Lepidoptera
- Superfamily: Noctuoidea
- Family: Noctuidae
- Genus: Acronicta
- Species: A. rubricoma

Binomial name
- Acronicta rubricoma Guenée, 1852

= Acronicta rubricoma =

Species of moth

Acronicta rubricoma, the ruddy dagger moth, is a moth of the family Noctuidae. It is found from southern Ontario and New York to central Florida, west to Texas and east Kansas.

The wingspan is 38–44 mm. Adults are on wing from April to October depending on the location. There are two generations per year.

The larvae feed on elm, hackberry and sumac.
