= Acronicta connecta =

Scientific classification
- Kingdom: Animalia
- Phylum: Arthropoda
- Clade: Pancrustacea
- Class: Insecta
- Order: Lepidoptera
- Superfamily: Noctuoidea
- Family: Noctuidae
- Genus: Acronicta
- Species: A. connecta

Binomial name
- Acronicta connecta Grote, 1873

Synonyms
- Acronycta connecta

Species of moth

Acronicta connecta, the connected dagger moth, is a species of moth of the family Noctuidae. It is found from the Great Lakes region to central New England, south to Florida, west to Texas and Utah.

The wingspan is 30–40 mm (1.2–1.6 in). Adults are on wing from May to August, depending on the location.

The larvae feed on leaves of Salix species.

== Subspecies ==
- Acronicta connecta connecta
- Acronicta connecta albina
