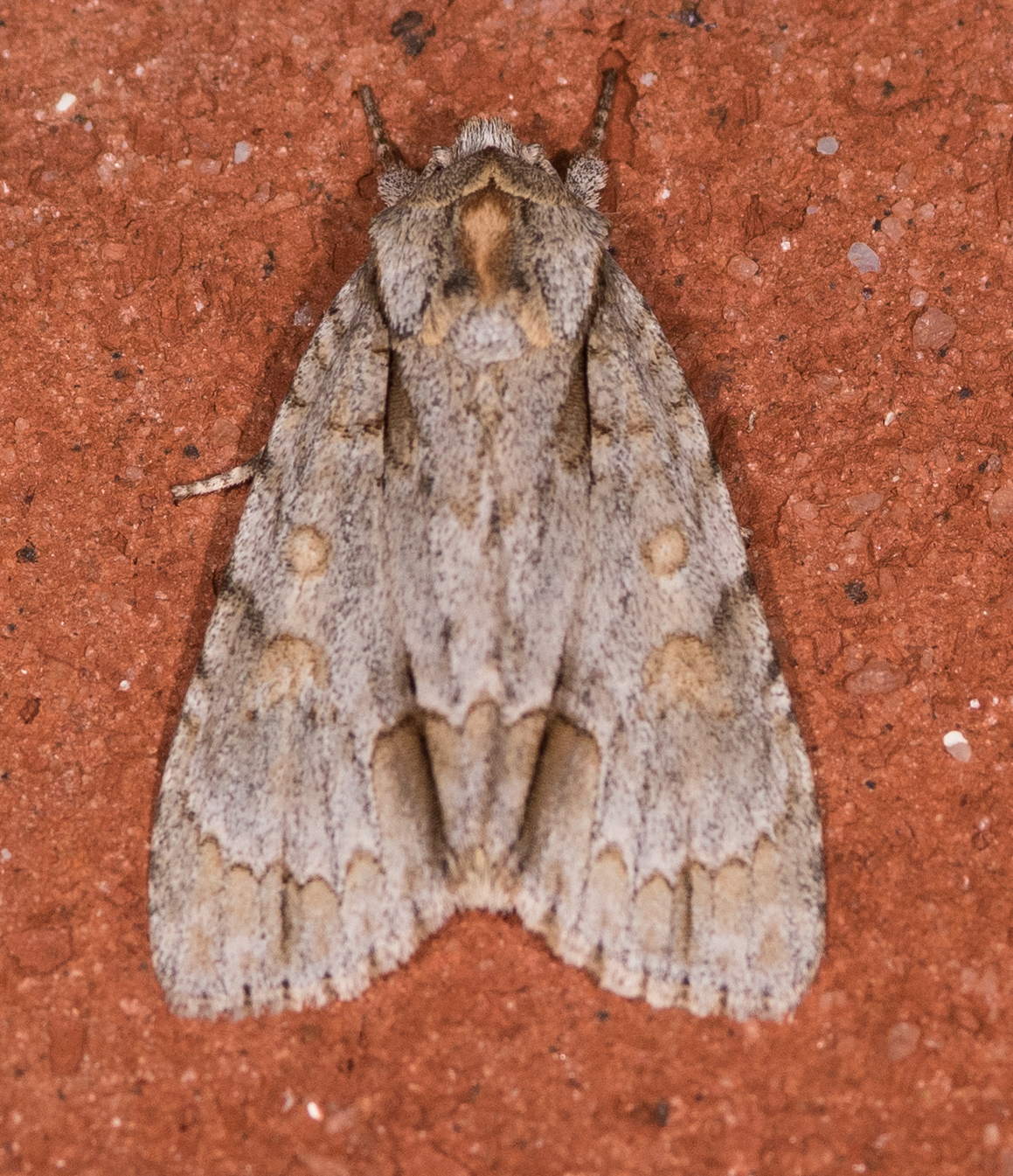

Scientific classification
- Kingdom: Animalia
- Phylum: Arthropoda
- Clade: Pancrustacea
- Class: Insecta
- Order: Lepidoptera
- Superfamily: Noctuoidea
- Family: Noctuidae
- Genus: Acronicta
- Species: A. morula

Binomial name
- Acronicta morula Grote & Robinson, 1868

= Acronicta morula =

Species of moth

Acronicta morula, the ochre dagger moth, is a moth of the family Noctuidae. The species was first described by Augustus Radcliffe Grote and Coleman Townsend Robinson in 1868. It is found from Saskatchewan to Nova Scotia, south to Florida, west to Texas.

The wingspan is 40–50 mm. Adults are on wing from April to September in two or more generations depending on the location.

The larvae feed on the leaves of Ulmus and also Tilia, Malus and Crataegus species.
