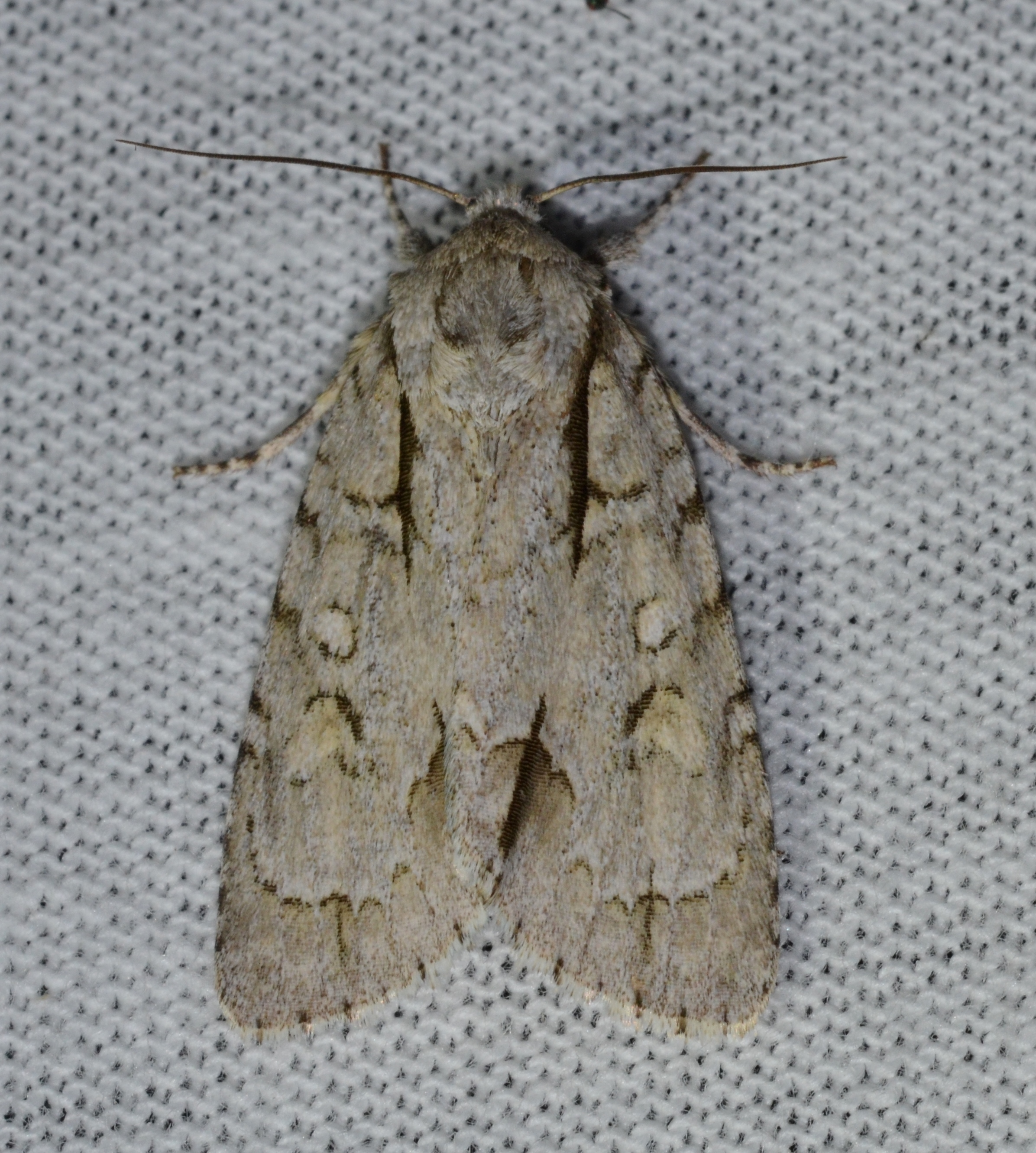

Scientific classification
- Kingdom: Animalia
- Phylum: Arthropoda
- Clade: Pancrustacea
- Class: Insecta
- Order: Lepidoptera
- Superfamily: Noctuoidea
- Family: Noctuidae
- Genus: Acronicta
- Species: A. interrupta

Binomial name
- Acronicta interrupta Guenée, 1852

Synonyms
- Acronicta occidentalis; Acronicta sagittaria; Acronicta elisabeta; Acronicta elizabeta

= Acronicta interrupta =

Interrupted dagger moth

Species of moth

Acronicta interrupta, the interrupted dagger moth, is a moth of the family Noctuidae. The species was first described by Achille Guenée in 1852. It is found across southern Canada south of the boreal forest, from New Brunswick west to eastern Alberta, south to Georgia, Nebraska and Arizona.

The wingspan is 35–42 mm. Adults are on wing from April to August or September depending on the location. There are two or more generations per year in the south and one in the north.

The larvae feed on apple, apricot, birch, cherry, crabapple, elm, hawthorn, hop-hornbeam, mountain-ash, oak, plum and willow.
