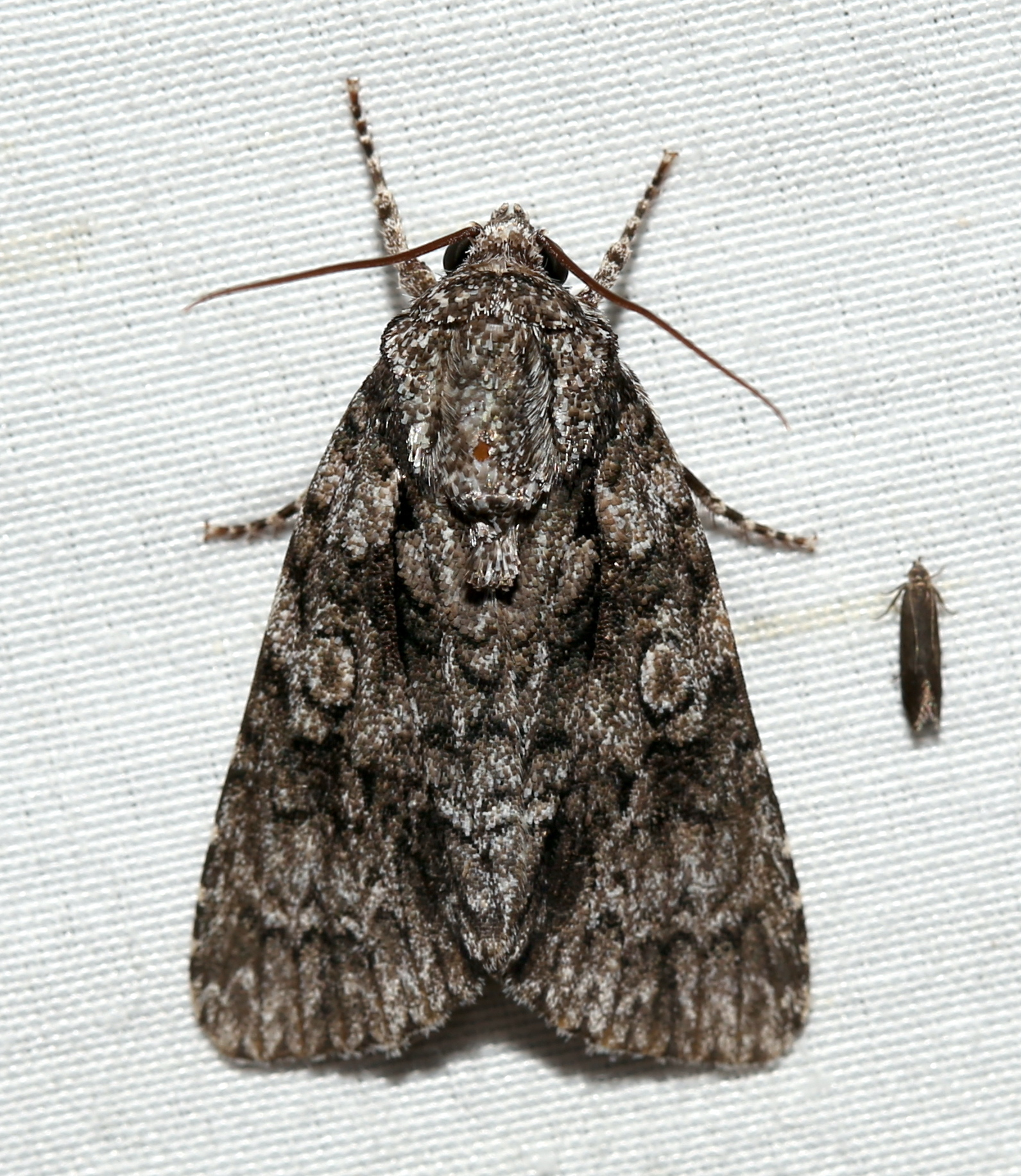

Scientific classification
- Kingdom: Animalia
- Phylum: Arthropoda
- Clade: Pancrustacea
- Class: Insecta
- Order: Lepidoptera
- Superfamily: Noctuoidea
- Family: Noctuidae
- Genus: Acronicta
- Species: A. brumosa

Binomial name
- Acronicta brumosa Guenée, 1852

= Acronicta brumosa =

Species of moth

Acronicta brumosa, the charred dagger moth, is a moth of the family Noctuidae. It is found from New York to Florida, west through the southern states to California, north at least to Utah.

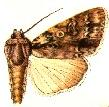

The wingspan is about 38 mm.

The larvae feed on various Quercus species.

== Subspecies ==
- Acronicta brumosa brumosa
- Acronicta brumosa persuasa
- Acronicta brumosa liturata
