= Acronicta bellula =

Scientific classification
- Kingdom: Animalia
- Phylum: Arthropoda
- Clade: Pancrustacea
- Class: Insecta
- Order: Lepidoptera
- Superfamily: Noctuoidea
- Family: Noctuidae
- Genus: Acronicta
- Species: A. bellula

Binomial name
- Acronicta bellula (Alpheraky, 1895)

Synonyms
- Acronycta bellula Alpheraky, 1895; Apatele cerasi Howarth, 1895

Species of moth

Acronicta bellula is a moth of the family Noctuidae. It is found in the Korean Peninsula, the Russian Far East, and China.
