= Acronicta sperata =

Scientific classification
- Kingdom: Animalia
- Phylum: Arthropoda
- Clade: Pancrustacea
- Class: Insecta
- Order: Lepidoptera
- Superfamily: Noctuoidea
- Family: Noctuidae
- Genus: Acronicta
- Species: A. sperata

Binomial name
- Acronicta sperata Grote, 1873

Species of moth

Acronicta sperata, the hopeful dagger moth, is a moth of the family Noctuidae. The species was first described by Augustus Radcliffe Grote in 1873. It is found in North America from New Brunswick west to the Alberta foothills, south to the District of Columbia, Missouri and in the mountains to Colorado.

The wingspan is 30–35 mm. Adults are on wing from May to June depending on the location.

The larvae feed on Populus and Alnus species.

== Subspecies ==
- Acronicta sperata sperata
- Acronicta sperata speratina
