= Acronicta nigricans =

Scientific classification
- Kingdom: Animalia
- Phylum: Arthropoda
- Clade: Pancrustacea
- Class: Insecta
- Order: Lepidoptera
- Superfamily: Noctuoidea
- Family: Noctuidae
- Genus: Acronicta
- Species: A. nigricans

Binomial name
- Acronicta nigricans Leech, 1900

Synonyms
- Acronycta nigricans Leech, 1900

Species of moth

Acronicta nigricans is a moth of the family Noctuidae. It is found in western China.
