= Acronicta tota =

Scientific classification
- Domain: Eukaryota
- Kingdom: Animalia
- Phylum: Arthropoda
- Class: Insecta
- Order: Lepidoptera
- Superfamily: Noctuoidea
- Family: Noctuidae
- Genus: Acronicta
- Species: A. tota

Binomial name
- Acronicta tota Grote, 1879

Species of moth

Acronicta tota is a moth of the family Noctuidae. It is found in Texas.
