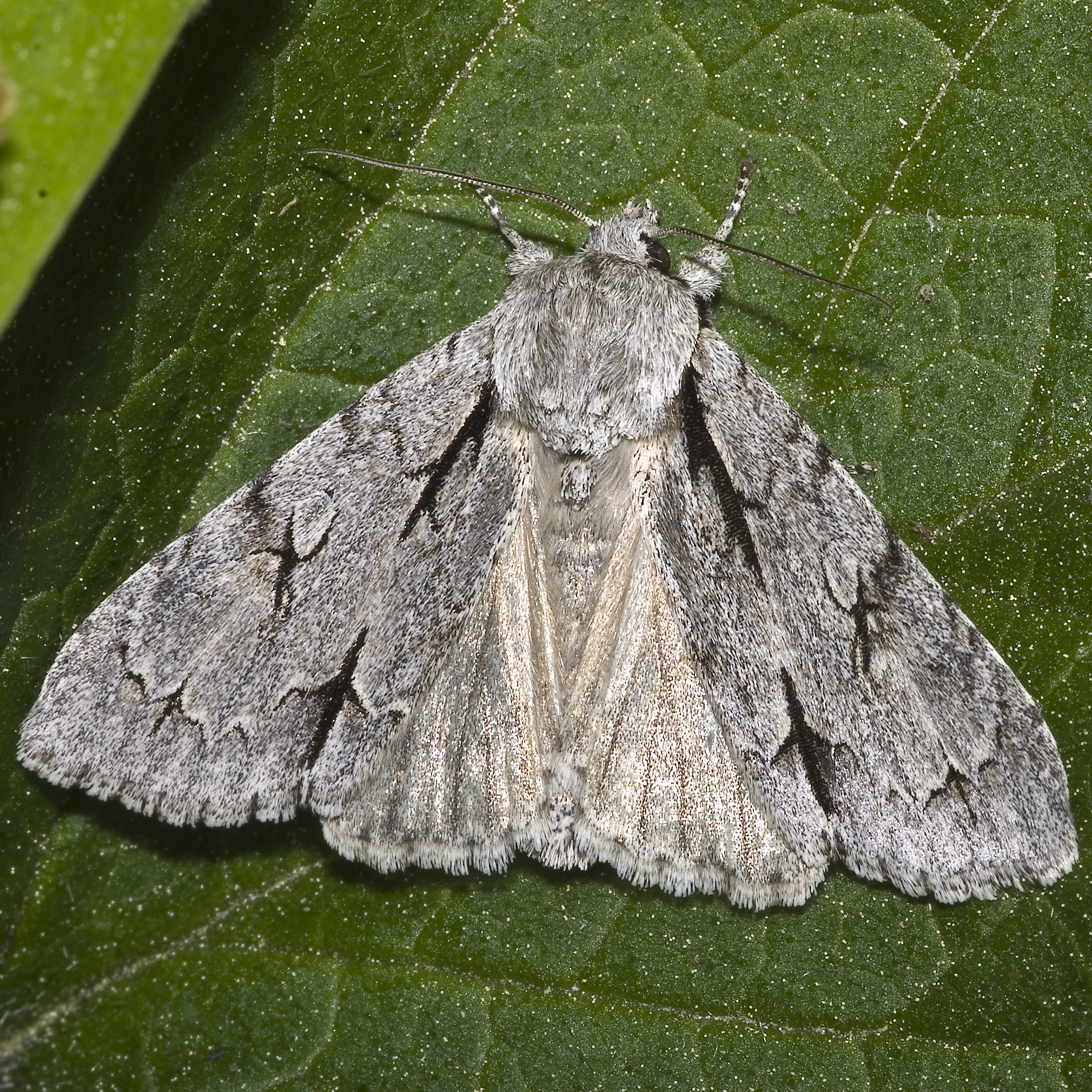
- Grey dagger, Acronicta psi Note the typical "dagger" marks

Scientific classification
- Kingdom: Animalia
- Phylum: Arthropoda
- Clade: Pancrustacea
- Class: Insecta
- Order: Lepidoptera
- Superfamily: Noctuoidea
- Family: Noctuidae
- Subfamily: Acronictinae
- Genus: Acronicta; Ochsenheimer, 1816

Type species
- Phalaena leporina Linnaeus, 1758

Diversity
- About 150 species

Synonyms
- Acronycta Treitschke, 1825 (unjustifiedemendation); Acronyctia Meigen, 1813 (lapsus); Apatela Stephens, 1829 (lapsus); Apatelae Ochsenheimer, 1816 (unavailable); Apatele Hübner, [1806] (suppressed); Apatele Hübner, [1808] (suppressed); Apatele Hübner, [1818] (unavailable); Apatele Hübner, 1822; Aneuviminia Beck, 1966; Arctomyscis Hübner, 1820; Chamaepora Warren, 1909; Cometa Sodoffsky, 1837; Cuspidia Chapman, 1890; Eulonche Grote, 1873; Euviminia Beck, 1966; Hyboma Hübner, 1827; Hylonycta Sugi, 1979; Jocheaera Hübner, 1827; Lepitoreuma Grote, 1873; Mastiphanes Grote, 1882; Megacronycta Grote, 1873; Microcoelia Guenée, 1852; Molybdonycta Sugi, 1979; Paraviminia Beck, 1966; Pharetra Hübner, [1827] 1816 (non Bolten, 1798: preoccupied); Philorgyia Grote, 1896; Plataplecta Butler, 1878; Pseudepunda Butler, 1890; Semaphora Guenée, 1841; Sematophora Agassiz, [1848] (unjustifiedemendation); Subacronicta Kozhanchikov, 1950; Triaena Hübner, 1827; Tricholonche Grote, 1896; Viminia Chapman, 1890

= Acronicta =

Genus of moths

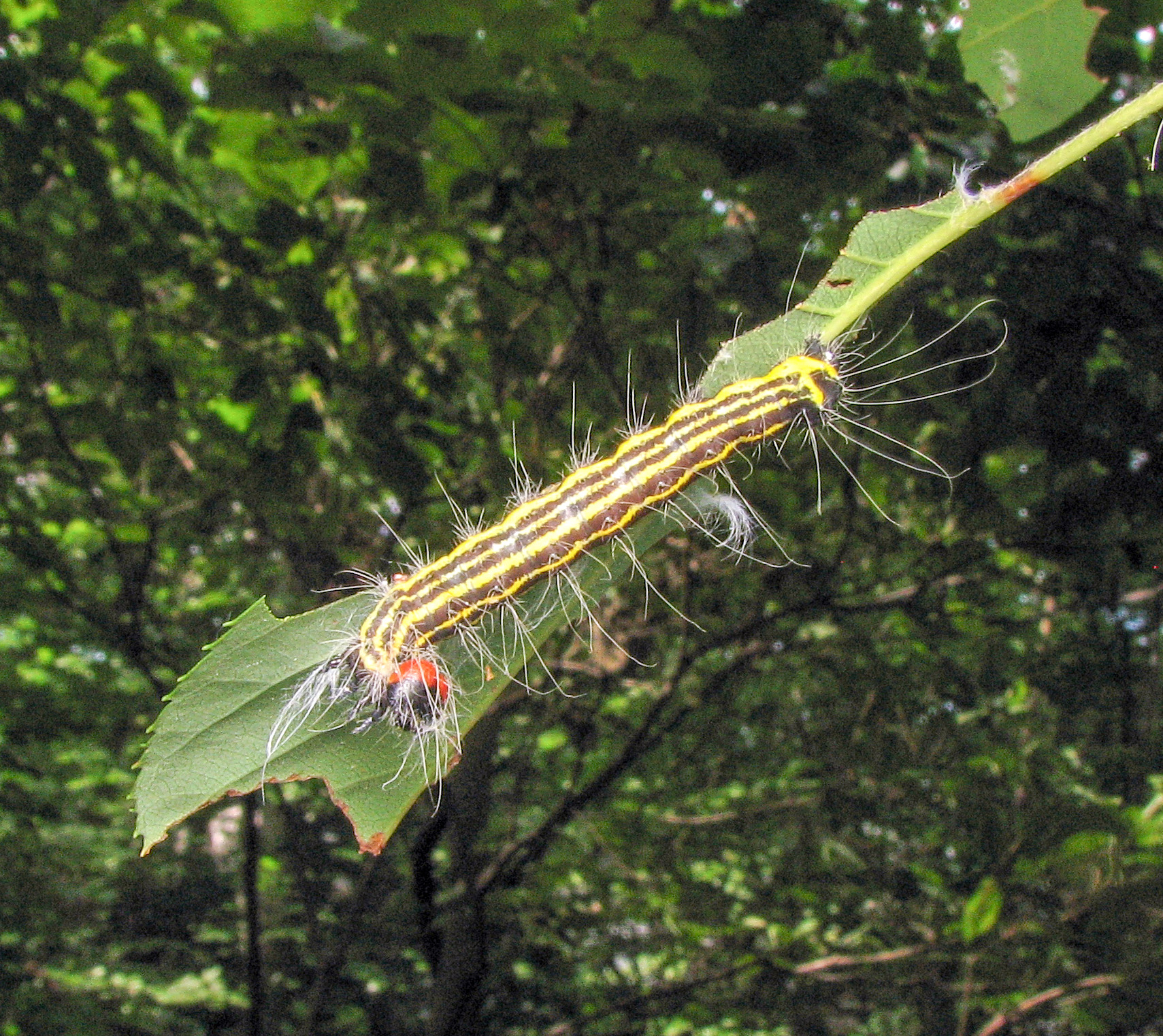
A. radcliffei caterpillar

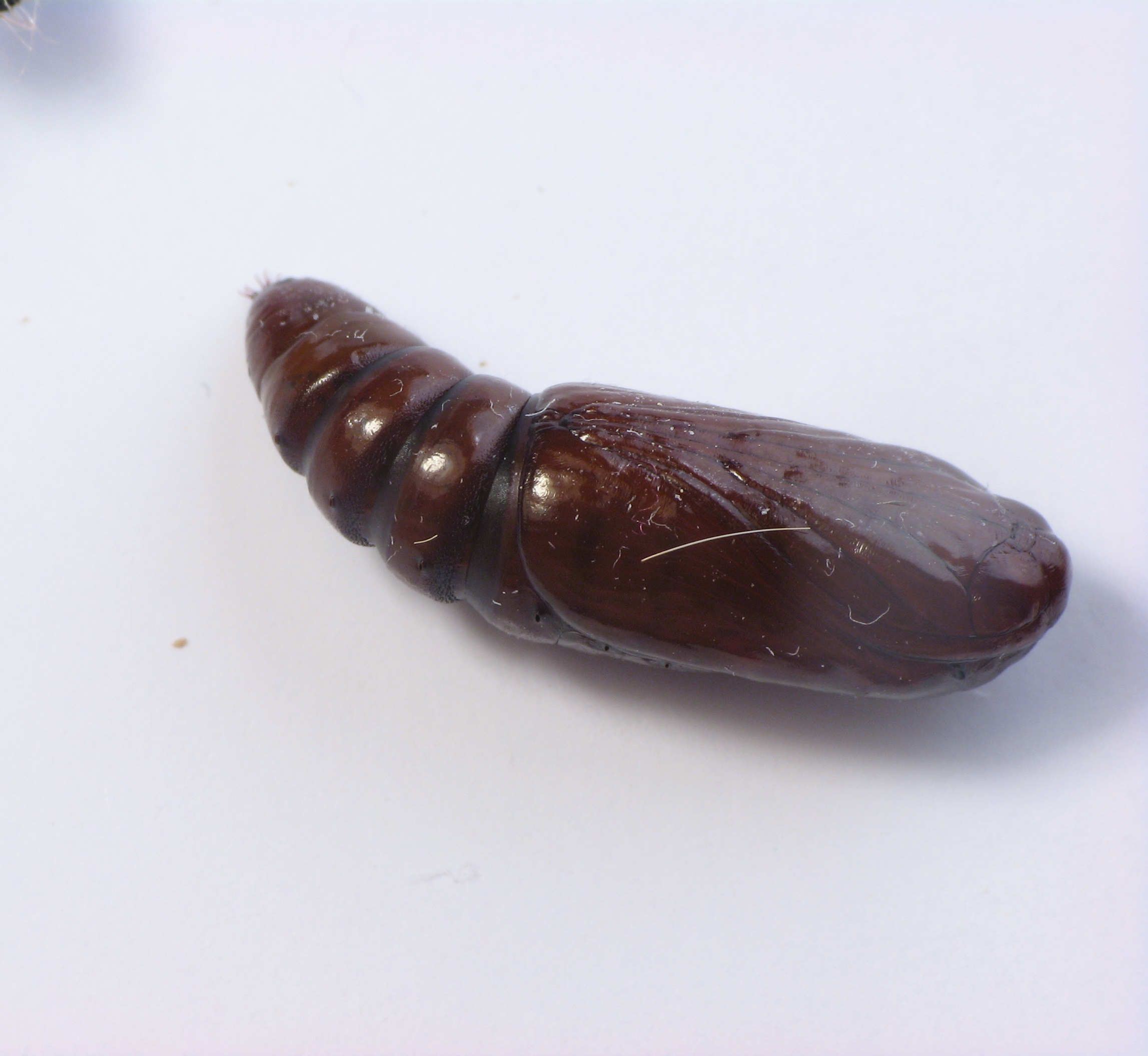
A. radcliffei pupa

Acronicta is a genus of noctuid moths containing about 150 species distributed mainly in the temperate Holarctic, with some in adjacent subtropical regions. The genus was erected by Carl Linnaeus in his 1758 10th edition of Systema Naturae. Caterpillars of most Acronicta species are unmistakable, with brightly colored hairy spikes, and often feed quite visibly on common foliate trees. The hairy spikes may contain poison, which cause itchy, painful, swollen rash in humans on contact. The larva of the smeared dagger moth (A. oblinita) is unusually hairy even for this genus. Acronicta species are generally known as dagger moths, as most have one or more black dagger-shaped markings on their forewing uppersides, but some species have a conspicuous dark ring marking instead.

== Description ==
Its eyes are naked and without eyelashes. The proboscis is fully developed. Antennae are simple in both sexes. Thorax and abdomen tuftless. Abdomen with long coarse hair on the dorsal part of proximal segments. Legs spineless. Forewings with non-crenulate cilia. Inner margin slightly lobed towards base.

== Species ==
The following species are classified in the genus.

- Acronicta aceris Linnaeus, 1758 – sycamore
- Acronicta adaucta Warren, 1909
- Acronicta afflicta Grote, 1864 – afflicted dagger moth
- Acronicta albarufa Grote, 1874
- Acronicta albistigma Hampson, 1909
- Acronicta alni Linnaeus, 1767 – alder moth
- Acronicta americana Harris, 1841 – American dagger moth
- Acronicta atristrigatus J.B. Smith, 1900 (alternative spelling Acronicta atristrigata)
- Acronicta auricoma [Schiffermüller], 1775 – scarce dagger
- Acronicta australis (Mustelin & Leuschner, 2000)
- Acronicta barnesii Smith, 1897
- Acronicta beameri Todd, 1958
- Acronicta bellula Alphéraky, 1895
- Acronicta betulae Riley, 1884 – birch dagger moth
- Acronicta bicolor Moore, 1881
- Acronicta browni Mustelin & Leuschner, 2000
- Acronicta brumosa Guenée, 1852 – charred dagger moth
- Acronicta carbonaria Graeser, 1889
- Acronicta catocaloida Graeser, 1889
- Acronicta centralis Erschoff, 1874
- Acronicta cinerea Hufnagel, 1766
- Acronicta clarescens Guenée, 1852 – clear dagger moth
- Acronicta concrepta Draudt 1937
- Acronicta connecta Grote, 1873 – connected dagger moth
- Acronicta cuspis Hübner, [1813] – large dagger
- Acronicta cyanescens Hampson, 1909
- Acronicta dahurica Kononenko & Han, 2008
- Acronicta dactylina Grote, 1874 – fingered dagger moth
- Acronicta denticulata Moore
- Acronicta digna Butler, 1881
- Acronicta dinawa Bethune-Baker, 1906
- Acronicta dolli (Barnes & McDunnough, 1918)
- Acronicta edolata Grote, 1881
- Acronicta euphorbiae [Schiffermüller], 1775 – sweet gale moth
- Acronicta exempta Dyar, 1922
- Acronicta exilis Grote, 1874 – exiled dagger moth
- Acronicta extricata Grote, 1882
- Acronicta falcula Grote, 1877
- Acronicta fragilis Guénée, 1852 – fragile dagger moth
- Acronicta funeralis Grote & Robinson, 1866 – funerary dagger moth
- Acronicta gastridia Swinhoe, 1895
- Acronicta grisea Walker, 1856 – gray dagger moth
- Acronicta hamamelis Guenée, 1852 (syn: Acronicta subochrea Grote, 1874) – witch hazel dagger moth
- Acronicta hasta Guenée, 1852 – speared dagger moth
- Acronicta hastulifera J.E. Smith, 1797 – frosted dagger moth
- Acronicta heitzmani Covell & Metzler, 1992 – Heitzman's dagger moth
- Acronicta hercules Felder & Rogenhofer, 1874
- Acronicta immodica Schmidt & Anweiler, 2020 - medium dagger moth
- Acronicta impleta Walker, 1856 – yellow-haired dagger moth
- Acronicta impressa Walker, 1856 – impressed dagger moth
- Acronicta inclara Smith, 1900 – unclear dagger moth
- Acronicta increta Morrison, 1974 – raspberry bud dagger
- Acronicta innotata Guenée, 1852 – unmarked dagger moth
- Acronicta insita Walker, 1856
- Acronicta intermedia Warren, 1909
- Acronicta interrupta Guenée, 1852 – interrupted dagger moth
- Acronicta iria Swinhoe, 1899
- Acronicta jozana Matsumura, 1926
- Acronicta laetifica Smith, 1897 – pleasant dagger moth
- Acronicta lanceolaria Grote, 1875 – lanceolate dagger moth
- Acronicta lepetita Smith, 1908
- Acronicta leporina Linnaeus, 1758 – miller
- Acronicta lepusculina Guenée, 1852 – cottonwood dagger moth
- Acronicta leucocuspis Butler, 1878
- Acronicta lithospila Grote, 1874 – streaked dagger moth
- Acronicta lobeliae Guenée, 1852 – lobelia dagger moth, greater oak dagger moth
- Acronicta longa Guenée, 1852 – long-winged dagger moth
- Acronicta lupini Grote, 1873 (syn: Acronicta ursina (Smith, 1898), Acronicta atlinensis (Barnes & Benjamin, 1927)
- Acronicta lutea Bremer & Grey 1852
- Acronicta major Bremer, 1861
- Acronicta mansueta Smith, 1897
- Acronicta marmorata Smith, 1897 – marble dagger moth
- Acronicta megacephala [Schiffermüller], 1775 – poplar grey
- Acronicta meghala
- Acronicta menyanthidis Esper, 1789 – light knot grass
- Acronicta metaxantha Hampson, 1909
- Acronicta modica Walker, 1856 – hesitant dagger moth
- Acronicta morula Grote & Robinson, 1868 – ochre dagger moth
- Acronicta nigricans Leech, 1900
- Acronicta noctivaga Grote, 1864 – night-wandering dagger moth
- Acronicta oblinita Smith, 1797 (syn: Acronicta arioch Strecker, 1898) – smeared dagger moth
- Acronicta omorii Matsumura, 1926
- Acronicta orientalis Mann, 1862
- Acronicta othello Smith, 1908
- Acronicta ovata Grote, 1873 – ovate dagger moth
- Acronicta parallela Grote, 1879
- Acronicta pasiphae Draudt, 1936
- Acronicta paupercula Grote, 1874
- Acronicta perblanda Ferguson, 1989
- Acronicta perdita Grote, 1874
- Acronicta pruinosa Guenée, 1852
- Acronicta psi Linnaeus, 1758 – grey dagger
- Acronicta psichinesis Kononenko & Han, 2008
- Acronicta psorallina Lower, 1903
- Acronicta pulverosa Hampson 1909
- Acronicta quadrata Smith, 1908
- Acronicta radcliffei Harvey, 1875 – Radcliffe's dagger moth
- Acronicta raphael Oberthur 1884
- Acronicta rapidan Dyar, 1912
- Acronicta retardata Walker, 1861 (syn: Acronicta caesarea Smith, 1905) – retarded dagger moth
- Acronicta rubiginosa Walker, 1862
- Acronicta rubricoma Guenée, 1852 – ruddy dagger moth
- Acronicta rumicis Linnaeus, 1758 – knot grass
- Acronicta sagittata McDunnough, 1940
- Acronicta sinescripta Ferguson, 1989
- Acronicta sperata Grote, 1873
- Acronicta spinea (Grote, 1876)
- Acronicta spinigera Guenée, 1852 – nondescript dagger moth
- Acronicta strigosa [Schiffermüller], 1775 – marsh dagger
- Acronicta strigulata Smith, 1897
- Acronicta subornata Leech, 1889
- Acronicta sugii (Kinoshita, 1990)
- Acronicta superans Guenée, 1852 – splendid dagger moth
- Acronicta theodora Schaus, 1894
- Acronicta thoracica Grote, 1880
- Acronicta tiena Püngeler, 1907
- Acronicta tota Grote, 1879
- Acronicta tridens [Schiffermüller], 1775 – dark dagger
- Acronicta tristis Smith, 1911
- Acronicta tritona Hübner, 1879 – Triton dagger moth
- Acronicta valliscola Blanchard, 1968
- Acronicta vinnula Grote, 1864 – delightful dagger moth
- Acronicta vulpina Grote, 1883 – miller dagger moth
