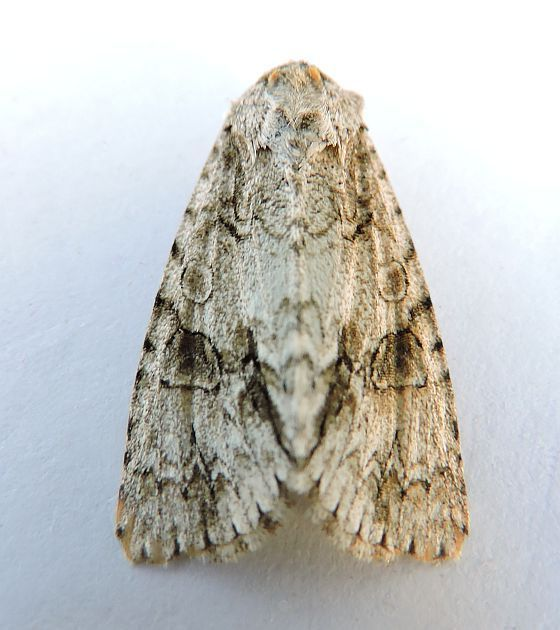

Scientific classification
- Kingdom: Animalia
- Phylum: Arthropoda
- Clade: Pancrustacea
- Class: Insecta
- Order: Lepidoptera
- Superfamily: Noctuoidea
- Family: Noctuidae
- Genus: Acronicta
- Species: A. beameri

Binomial name
- Acronicta beameri Todd, 1958

= Acronicta beameri =

Species of moth

Acronicta beameri is a moth of the family Noctuidae. It is found from Texas to Arizona.

The wingspan is 37–43 mm.
