= Acronicta adaucta =

Scientific classification
- Kingdom: Animalia
- Phylum: Arthropoda
- Clade: Pancrustacea
- Class: Insecta
- Order: Lepidoptera
- Superfamily: Noctuoidea
- Family: Noctuidae
- Genus: Acronicta
- Species: A. adaucta

Binomial name
- Acronicta adaucta Warren, 1909/1910

Synonyms
- Acronicta phaedra Hampson, 1910

Species of moth

Acronicta adaucta is a moth of the family Noctuidae, first described by William Warren in 1909. It is found in the Korean Peninsula, Japan, north-eastern China and the Russian Far East (Primorye, Khabarovsk, Amur region, Sakhalin, and southern Kuriles).
