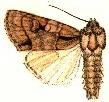

Scientific classification
- Kingdom: Animalia
- Phylum: Arthropoda
- Clade: Pancrustacea
- Class: Insecta
- Order: Lepidoptera
- Superfamily: Noctuoidea
- Family: Noctuidae
- Genus: Acronicta
- Species: A. quadrata

Binomial name
- Acronicta quadrata Smith, 1908

= Acronicta quadrata =

Species of moth

Acronicta quadrata, the quadrate dagger moth, is a moth of the family Noctuidae. The species was first described by Smith in 1908. In Canada, it occurs across the wooded area north to the southern edge of the boreal forest. It extends from western Quebec, west to the Rocky Mountains in Alberta and north-western British Columbia. It is widespread in the western parts of the United States.

The wingspan is 30–40 mm. Adults are on wing from June to July depending on the location.
