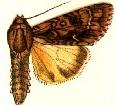

Scientific classification
- Kingdom: Animalia
- Phylum: Arthropoda
- Clade: Pancrustacea
- Class: Insecta
- Order: Lepidoptera
- Superfamily: Noctuoidea
- Family: Noctuidae
- Genus: Acronicta
- Species: A. metaxantha

Binomial name
- Acronicta metaxantha Hampson, 1909

Synonyms
- Acronycta metaxantha Hampson, 1909; Acronicta funesta (Draudt, 1950); Acronycta funesta Draudt, 1950

= Acronicta metaxantha =

Species of moth

Acronicta metaxantha is a moth of the family Noctuidae. It is found in western China.
