= Acronicta centralis =

Scientific classification
- Kingdom: Animalia
- Phylum: Arthropoda
- Clade: Pancrustacea
- Class: Insecta
- Order: Lepidoptera
- Superfamily: Noctuoidea
- Family: Noctuidae
- Genus: Acronicta
- Species: A. centralis

Binomial name
- Acronicta centralis Erschoff, 1874

Species of moth

Acronicta centralis is a moth of the family Noctuidae. It is found in Armenia, Iran, Tajikistan and Mongolia.
