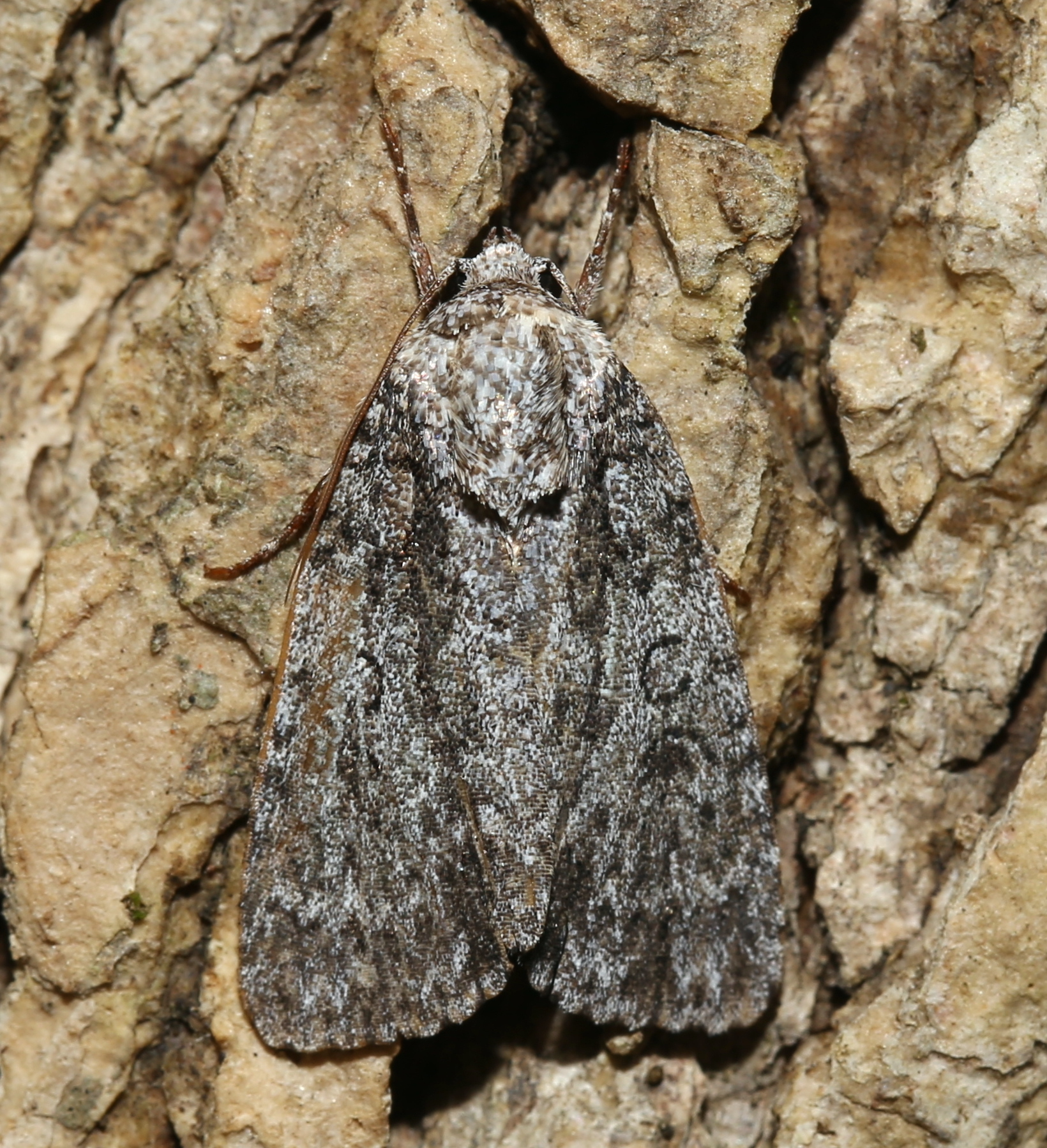

Scientific classification
- Kingdom: Animalia
- Phylum: Arthropoda
- Clade: Pancrustacea
- Class: Insecta
- Order: Lepidoptera
- Superfamily: Noctuoidea
- Family: Noctuidae
- Genus: Acronicta
- Species: A. hamamelis

Binomial name
- Acronicta hamamelis Guenée, 1852

Synonyms
- Acronicta subochrea Grote, 1874

= Acronicta hamamelis =

Species of moth of the family Noctuidae

Acronicta hamamelis, the witch hazel dagger moth or puzzling dagger moth, is a moth of the family Noctuidae. The species was first described by Achille Guenée in 1852. It is found in Canada (Nova Scotia, Quebec and Ontario) and parts of the United States, including Maryland.

The larvae feed on witch-hazel.
