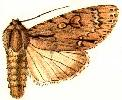

Scientific classification
- Kingdom: Animalia
- Phylum: Arthropoda
- Clade: Pancrustacea
- Class: Insecta
- Order: Lepidoptera
- Superfamily: Noctuoidea
- Family: Noctuidae
- Genus: Acronicta
- Species: A. iria

Binomial name
- Acronicta iria C. Swinhoe, 1899

= Acronicta iria =

Species of moth

Acronicta iria is a moth of the family Noctuidae first described by Charles Swinhoe in 1899. It is found in India.
