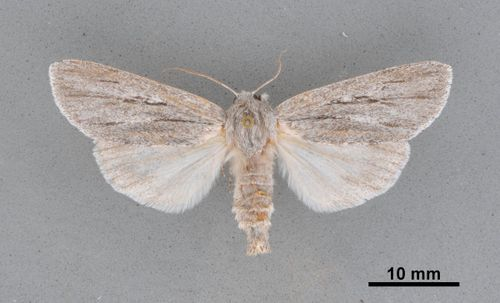

Scientific classification
- Kingdom: Animalia
- Phylum: Arthropoda
- Clade: Pancrustacea
- Class: Insecta
- Order: Lepidoptera
- Superfamily: Noctuoidea
- Family: Noctuidae
- Genus: Acronicta
- Species: A. sinescripta

Binomial name
- Acronicta sinescripta Ferguson, 1989

= Acronicta sinescripta =

Species of moth

Acronicta sinescripta is a moth of the family Noctuidae. It is found from South Carolina to Highlands County, Florida and westward through the Gulf States to Louisiana.

Adults are on wing from March to September. There are four generations per year.
