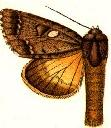

Scientific classification
- Kingdom: Animalia
- Phylum: Arthropoda
- Clade: Pancrustacea
- Class: Insecta
- Order: Lepidoptera
- Superfamily: Noctuoidea
- Family: Noctuidae
- Genus: Acronicta
- Species: A. albistigma

Binomial name
- Acronicta albistigma (Hampson, 1909)

Synonyms
- Acronycta albistigma Hampson, 1909; Acronycta cavillatrix Draudt, 1937

= Acronicta albistigma =

Species of moth

Acronicta albistigma is a moth of the family Noctuidae. It is found in China, Japan, and Taiwan.
