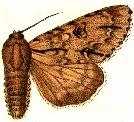

Scientific classification
- Kingdom: Animalia
- Phylum: Arthropoda
- Clade: Pancrustacea
- Class: Insecta
- Order: Lepidoptera
- Superfamily: Noctuoidea
- Family: Noctuidae
- Genus: Acronicta
- Species: A. major

Binomial name
- Acronicta major Bremer, 1861

Synonyms
- Acronicta maxima Moore, 1881

= Acronicta major =

Species of moth

Acronicta major is a moth of the family Noctuidae. It is found in the Korean Peninsula, China to Tibet, Japan, the Russian Far East (Primorye, Khabarovsk, Amur region, Sakhalin, southern Kuriles), southern Siberia (Altai), northern India and Nepal.

== Subspecies ==
- Acronicta major major
- Acronicta major atritaigensa (southern West Siberia)
