= Acronicta concrepta =

Scientific classification
- Kingdom: Animalia
- Phylum: Arthropoda
- Clade: Pancrustacea
- Class: Insecta
- Order: Lepidoptera
- Superfamily: Noctuoidea
- Family: Noctuidae
- Genus: Acronicta
- Species: A. concrepta

Binomial name
- Acronicta concrepta Draudt, 1937

Synonyms
- Acronycta concrepta Draudt, 1937

Species of moth

Acronicta concrepta is a moth of the family Noctuidae. It is found in the Korean Peninsula, China, Japan (Hokkaido), the Russian Far East (Primorye, Khabarovsk, Amur region, Sakhalin, southern Kuriles) and south-eastern Siberia (Transbaikalia).
