= Acronicta strigulata =

Scientific classification
- Kingdom: Animalia
- Phylum: Arthropoda
- Clade: Pancrustacea
- Class: Insecta
- Order: Lepidoptera
- Superfamily: Noctuoidea
- Family: Noctuidae
- Genus: Acronicta
- Species: A. strigulata

Binomial name
- Acronicta strigulata Smith, 1897

Species of moth

Acronicta strigulata is a moth of the family Noctuidae. It is found from British Columbia, south to California.

The wingspan is about 35 mm.
