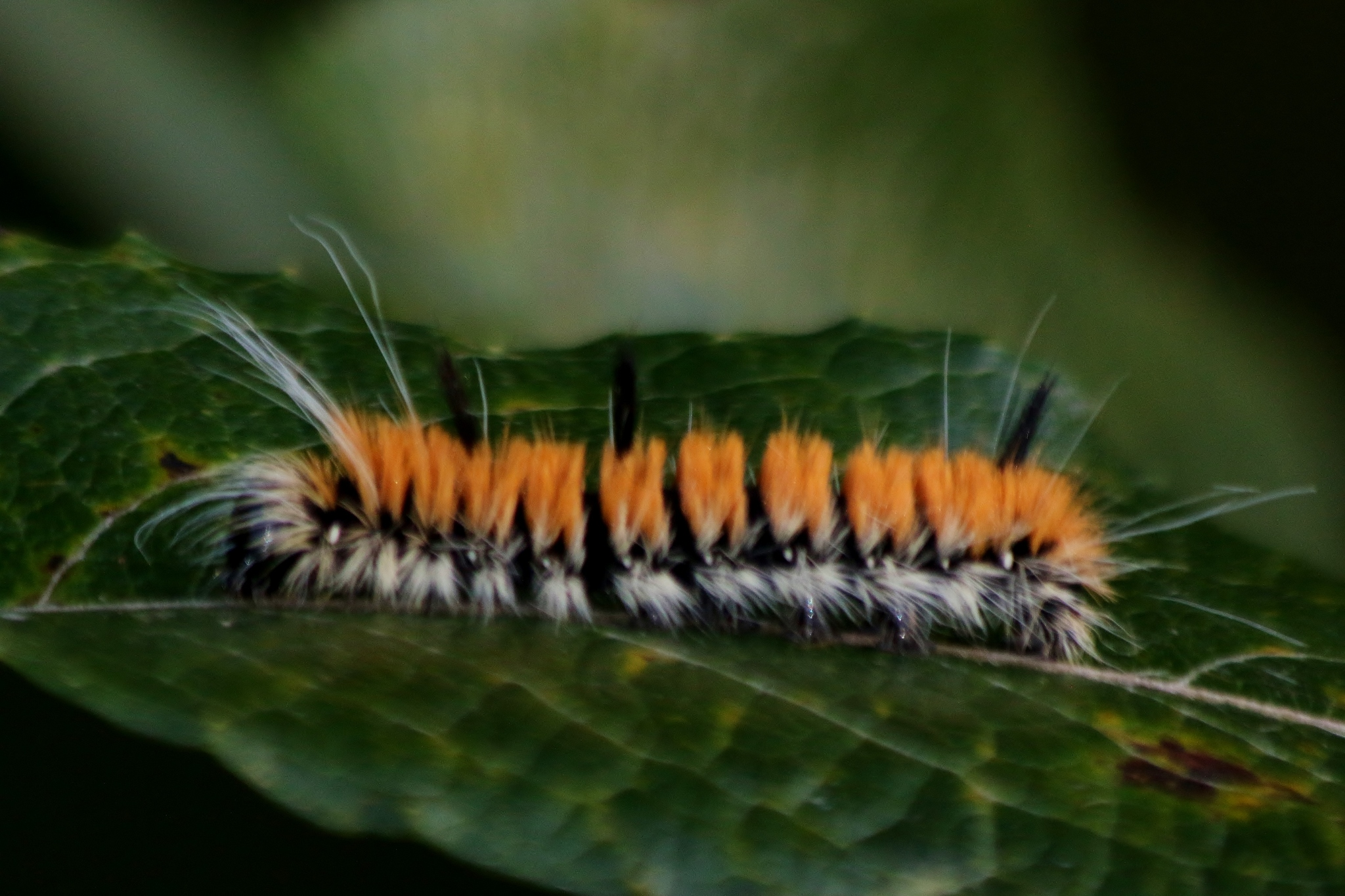
- Acronicta insita, fingered dagger, Washington

Scientific classification
- Kingdom: Animalia
- Phylum: Arthropoda
- Clade: Pancrustacea
- Class: Insecta
- Order: Lepidoptera
- Superfamily: Noctuoidea
- Family: Noctuidae
- Genus: Acronicta
- Species: A. insita

Binomial name
- Acronicta insita Grote, 1874

Synonyms
- Acronycta dactylina Grote, 1874 Acronycta denvera Smith, 1905 Acronycta hesperida Smith, 1897

= Acronicta insita =

Species of moth

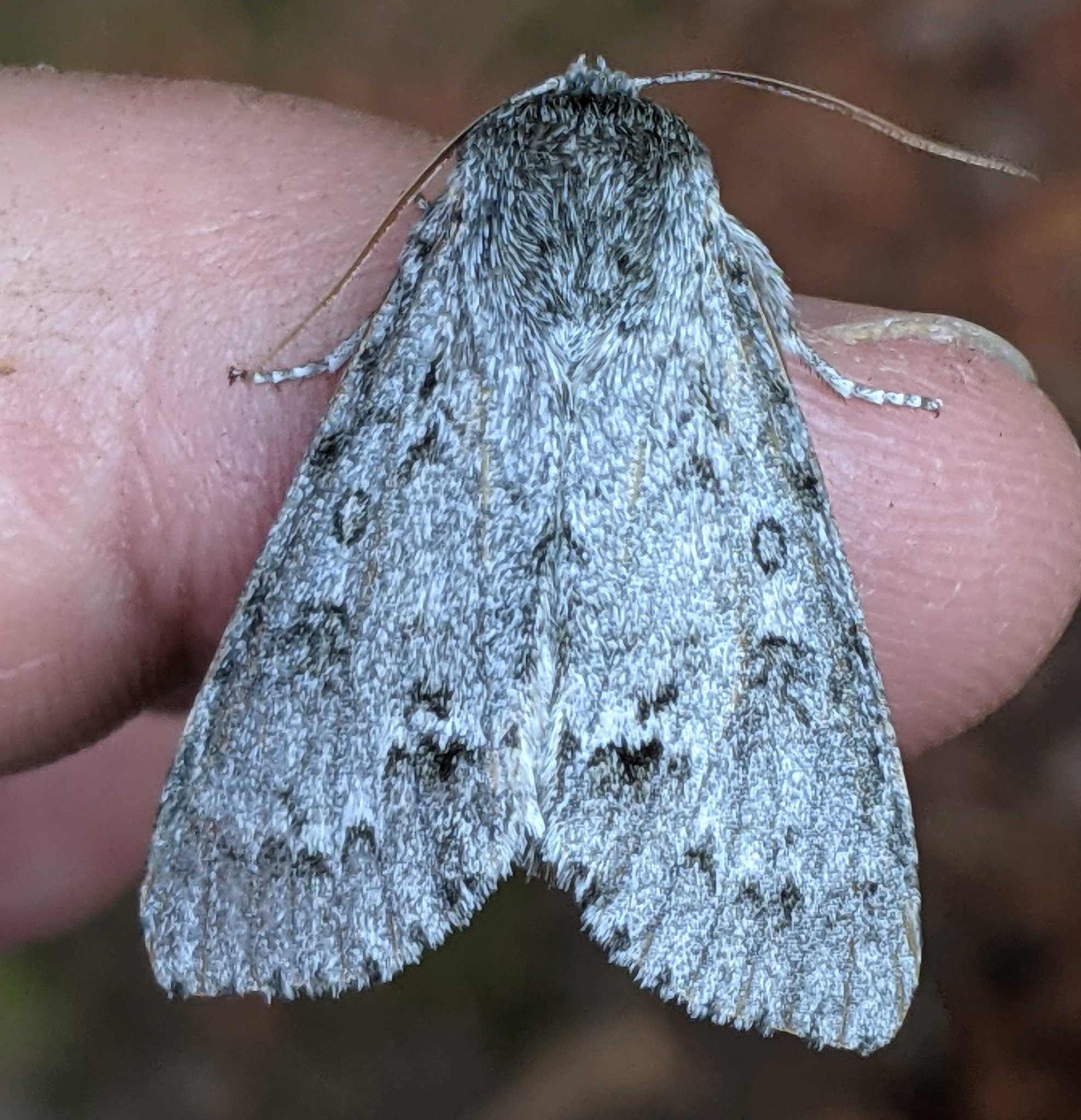
Acronicta insita, fingered dagger, Canada

Acronicta insita, the large gray dagger or fingered dagger, is a moth of the family Noctuidae. The species was first described by Augustus Radcliffe Grote in 1874. It is found from Newfoundland west to the Pacific coast and Vancouver Island and Haida Gwaii, British Columbia, south to North Carolina and Colorado.

Acronicta hesperida and Acronicta dactylina were formerly considered to be separate species, but are now considered a synonym.

The wingspan is 45–55 mm. Adults are on wing from May to July in one generation depending on the location.

The larvae feed on alder, birch, poplar, hawthorn and willow.

They have fine hairs that are actually hollow, containing a toxin within. If direct contact is made through handling or even indirect contact through clothing, mild to severe rashes may appear for up to a week and may spread easily to other areas of the body through clothing rubbing on exposed area or scratching. Some people react more seriously while others have no reaction at all.
