= Acronicta sugii =

Scientific classification
- Kingdom: Animalia
- Phylum: Arthropoda
- Clade: Pancrustacea
- Class: Insecta
- Order: Lepidoptera
- Superfamily: Noctuoidea
- Family: Noctuidae
- Genus: Acronicta
- Species: A. sugii

Binomial name
- Acronicta sugii (Kinoshita, 1990)

Synonyms
- Triaena sugii Kinoshita, 1990

Species of moth

Acronicta sugii is a moth of the family Noctuidae. It is found in Japan (Hokkaido, Honshu), the Korean Peninsula, and the Russian Far East.

The forewing length is 18–20 mm (0.71–0.79 in). The wingspan is 37–43 mm (1.5–1.7 in).
