= Acronicta lutea =

Scientific classification
- Kingdom: Animalia
- Phylum: Arthropoda
- Clade: Pancrustacea
- Class: Insecta
- Order: Lepidoptera
- Superfamily: Noctuoidea
- Family: Noctuidae
- Genus: Acronicta
- Species: A. lutea

Binomial name
- Acronicta lutea Bremer & Grey, 1852

Synonyms
- Acronycta lutea Bremer & Grey, 1852; Pharetra leucoptera Butler, 1852; Acronycta suigensis Matsumura, 1852

Species of moth

Acronicta lutea is a moth of the family Noctuidae. It is found in the Korean Peninsula, China, eastern Siberia (Transbaikalia), Japan (Honshu), Mongolia and the Russian Far East (Amur region, Khabarovsk, Primorye, southern Sakhalin).
