= Acronicta impressa =

Scientific classification
- Kingdom: Animalia
- Phylum: Arthropoda
- Clade: Pancrustacea
- Class: Insecta
- Order: Lepidoptera
- Superfamily: Noctuoidea
- Family: Noctuidae
- Genus: Acronicta
- Species: A. impressa

Binomial name
- Acronicta impressa Walker, 1856

Synonyms
- Acronicta fasciata; Acronicta verrilli; Acronicta lemmeri; Acronicta distans Grote, 1879; Acronicta scintillans Franclemont, 1938; Acronicta acla Benjamin, 1933

Species of moth

Acronicta impressa, the impressive dagger moth or willow dagger moth, is a moth of the family Noctuidae. The species was first described by Francis Walker in 1856. It is found from western Canada to north-western Mexico.

The wingspan is about 38 mm. Adults are on wing from early to midsummer depending on the location.

Recorded food plants include bitterbrush, rose, aspen, poplar and willow.

== Subspecies ==
- Acronicta impressa impressa
- Acronicta impressa emaculata
