= Acronicta australis =

Scientific classification
- Kingdom: Animalia
- Phylum: Arthropoda
- Clade: Pancrustacea
- Class: Insecta
- Order: Lepidoptera
- Superfamily: Noctuoidea
- Family: Noctuidae
- Genus: Acronicta
- Species: A. australis

Binomial name
- Acronicta australis (Mustelin & Leuschner, 2000)

Species of moth

Acronicta australis is a species of moth in the family Noctuidae (the owlet moths). It is found in North America.

The MONA or Hodges number for Acronicta australis is 9275.1.
