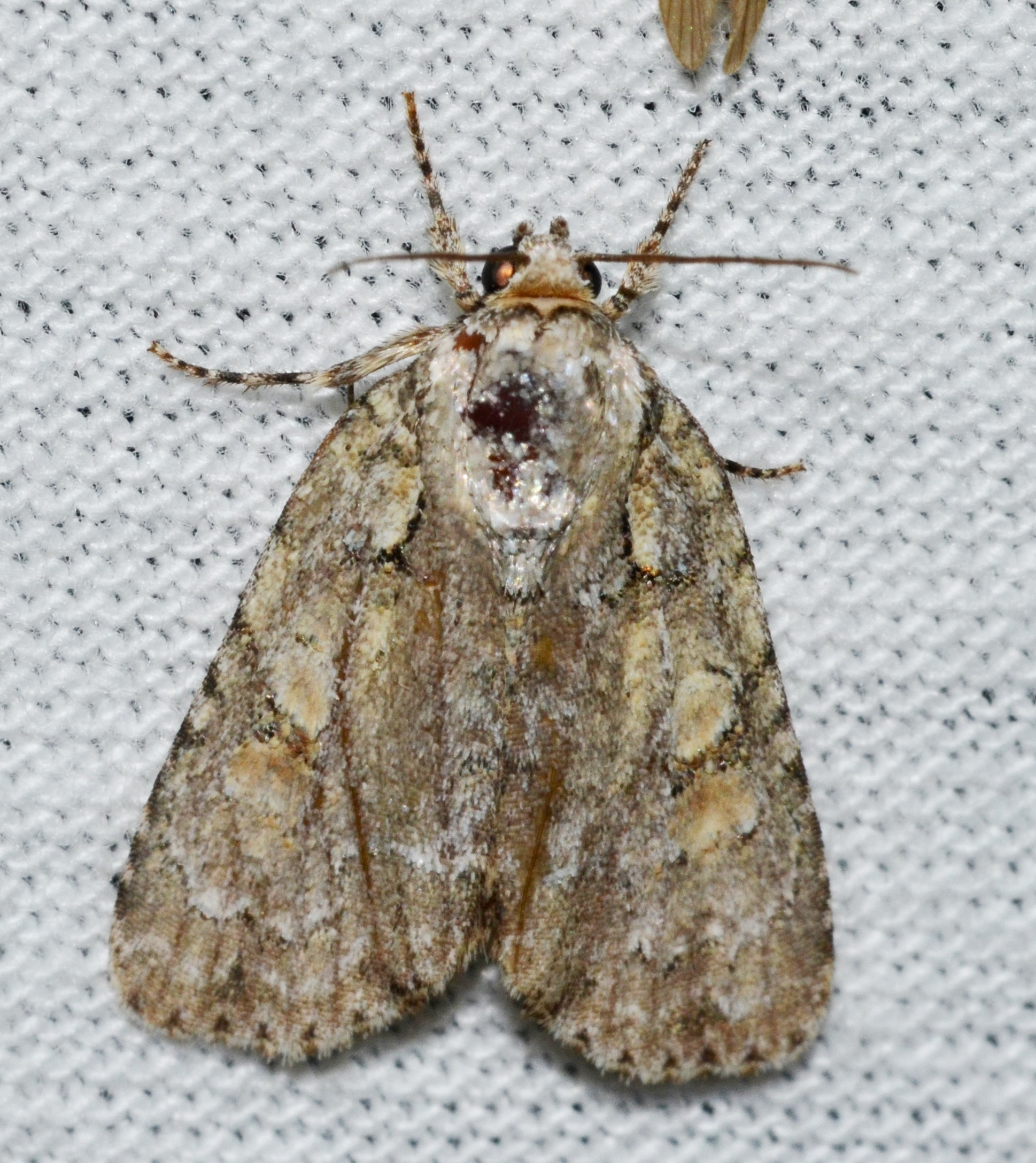

Scientific classification
- Kingdom: Animalia
- Phylum: Arthropoda
- Clade: Pancrustacea
- Class: Insecta
- Order: Lepidoptera
- Superfamily: Noctuoidea
- Family: Noctuidae
- Genus: Acronicta
- Species: A. ovata

Binomial name
- Acronicta ovata Grote, 1873

= Acronicta ovata =

Species of moth

Acronicta ovata, the ovate dagger moth, is a moth of the family Noctuidae. It is found from Nova Scotia to North Carolina, west to Texas, north to Manitoba.

The wingspan is 28–35 mm. Adults are on wing from May to September depending on the location. There are two or more generations per year.

The larvae feed on the leaves of beech, birch, chestnut, hickory, tupelo and oak, reportedly preferring the latter host.
