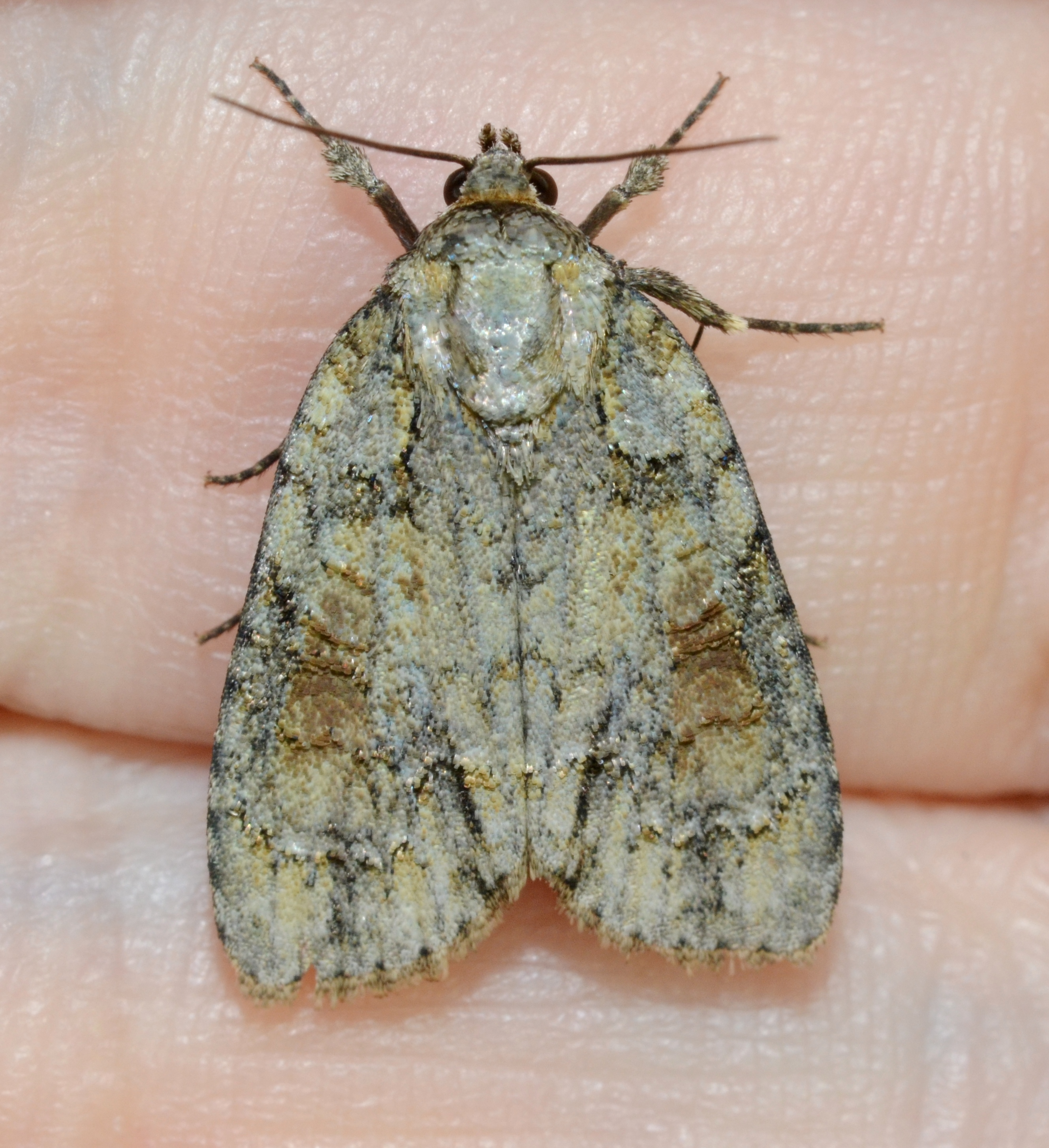

Scientific classification
- Kingdom: Animalia
- Phylum: Arthropoda
- Clade: Pancrustacea
- Class: Insecta
- Order: Lepidoptera
- Superfamily: Noctuoidea
- Family: Noctuidae
- Genus: Acronicta
- Species: A. exilis

Binomial name
- Acronicta exilis Grote, 1874

= Acronicta exilis =

Species of moth

Acronicta exilis, the exiled dagger moth, is a moth of the family Noctuidae. The species is found in North America, including Iowa, New York, Maryland, Arkansas and Delaware.

The larvae feed on Quercus species.
