= Acronicta dahurica =

Scientific classification
- Kingdom: Animalia
- Phylum: Arthropoda
- Clade: Pancrustacea
- Class: Insecta
- Order: Lepidoptera
- Superfamily: Noctuoidea
- Family: Noctuidae
- Genus: Acronicta
- Species: A. dahurica

Binomial name
- Acronicta dahurica Kononenko & Han, 2008

Species of moth

Acronicta dahurica is a moth of the family Noctuidae. It is found in northern China and the Russian Far East.

Wingspan is 38 mm (1.5 in) in males and 40 mm (1.6 in) in females. Adults fly in mid May–early June.
