= Acronicta rapidan =

Scientific classification
- Kingdom: Animalia
- Phylum: Arthropoda
- Clade: Pancrustacea
- Class: Insecta
- Order: Lepidoptera
- Superfamily: Noctuoidea
- Family: Noctuidae
- Genus: Acronicta
- Species: A. rapidan

Binomial name
- Acronicta rapidan (Dyar, 1912)

Species of moth

Acronicta rapidan is a species of moth in the family Noctuidae (the owlet moths). It is found in North America.

The MONA or Hodges number for Acronicta rapidan is 9220.
