= Acronicta tristis =

Scientific classification
- Domain: Eukaryota
- Kingdom: Animalia
- Phylum: Arthropoda
- Class: Insecta
- Order: Lepidoptera
- Superfamily: Noctuoidea
- Family: Noctuidae
- Genus: Acronicta
- Species: A. tristis

Binomial name
- Acronicta tristis Smith, 1911

Species of moth

Acronicta tristis is a moth of the family Noctuidae. It is found from Ontario, Quebec and New Brunswick, south to Maryland, Pennsylvania and Ohio.

The wingspan is about 34 mm. Adults are on wing from June to July.
