= Acronicta psorallina =

Scientific classification
- Kingdom: Animalia
- Phylum: Arthropoda
- Clade: Pancrustacea
- Class: Insecta
- Order: Lepidoptera
- Superfamily: Noctuoidea
- Family: Noctuidae
- Genus: Acronicta
- Species: A. psorallina

Binomial name
- Acronicta psorallina (Lower, 1903)

Synonyms
- Acronycta psorallina Lower, 1903

Species of moth

Acronicta psorallina is a moth of the family Noctuidae. It is found in Queensland.

The wingspan is about 30 mm.
