= Acronicta raphael =

Scientific classification
- Kingdom: Animalia
- Phylum: Arthropoda
- Clade: Pancrustacea
- Class: Insecta
- Order: Lepidoptera
- Superfamily: Noctuoidea
- Family: Noctuidae
- Genus: Acronicta
- Species: A. raphael

Binomial name
- Acronicta raphael (Oberthur, 1884)

Synonyms
- Acronycta raphael Oberthur, 1884; Acronycta fixseni Graeser, 1888; Acronicta cubitata Warren, 1914

Species of moth

Acronicta raphael is a moth of the family Noctuidae. It is found in the Korean Peninsula and the Russian Far East.
