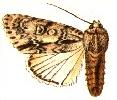

Scientific classification
- Domain: Eukaryota
- Kingdom: Animalia
- Phylum: Arthropoda
- Class: Insecta
- Order: Lepidoptera
- Superfamily: Noctuoidea
- Family: Noctuidae
- Genus: Acronicta
- Species: A. theodora

Binomial name
- Acronicta theodora Schaus, 1894

= Acronicta theodora =

Species of moth

Acronicta theodora is a moth of the family Noctuidae. It is found in North America, including Mexico.
