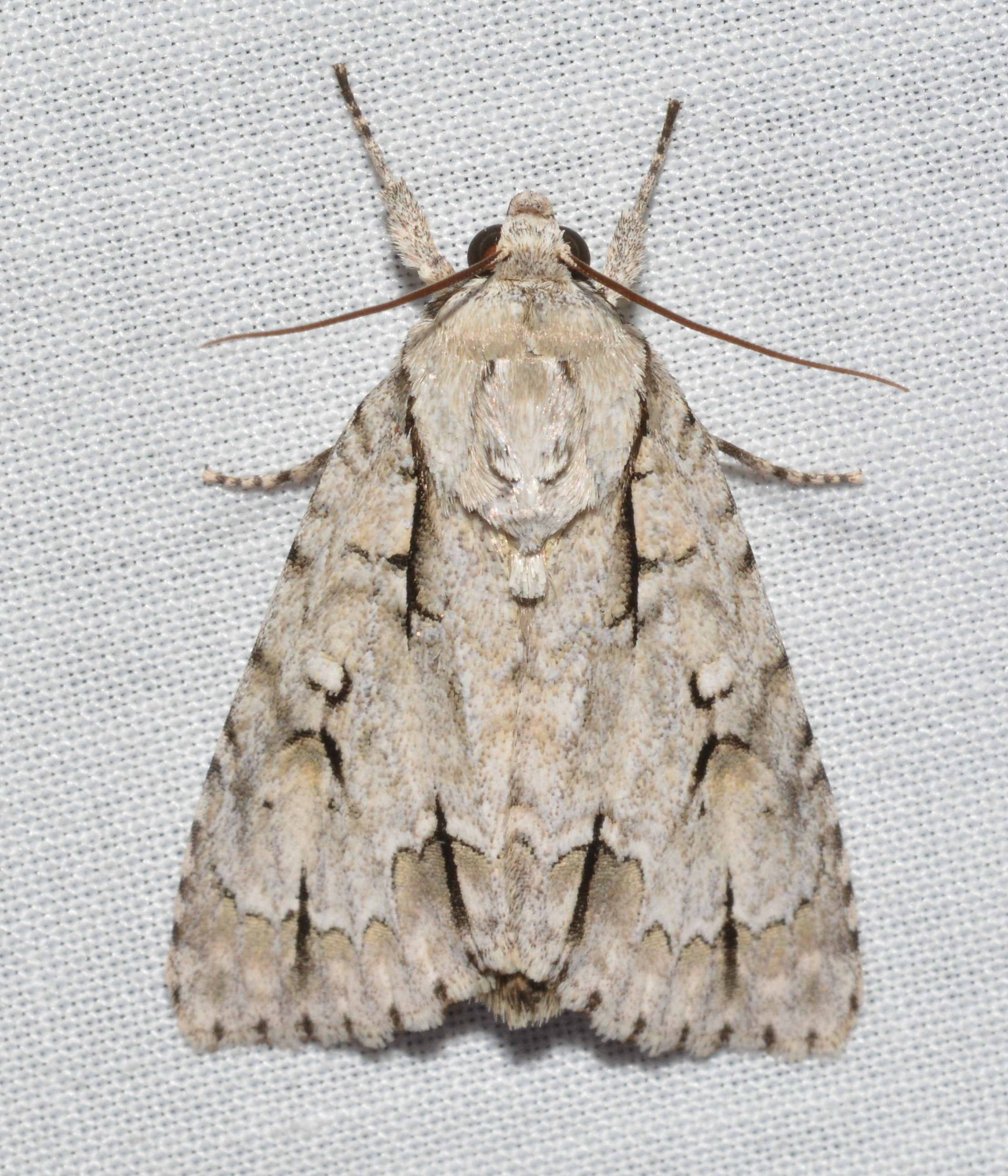

Scientific classification
- Kingdom: Animalia
- Phylum: Arthropoda
- Clade: Pancrustacea
- Class: Insecta
- Order: Lepidoptera
- Superfamily: Noctuoidea
- Family: Noctuidae
- Genus: Acronicta
- Species: A. laetifica

Binomial name
- Acronicta laetifica J. B. Smith, 1897

= Acronicta laetifica =

Species of moth

Acronicta laetifica, the pleasant dagger moth, is a species of moth in the family Noctuidae. The species was first described by John Bernhardt Smith in 1897. It is found in North America from Nova Scotia to Florida, west to Texas, north to Manitoba.

The wingspan is 37–43 mm. Adults are on wing from May to July in Ohio and from April to October in the south. There are two or more generations in the south and one in the north.

The larvae feed on Carya species (hickory).
