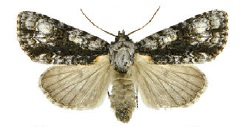

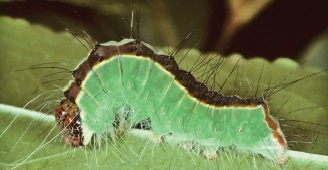
- Adult (top) and larva (bottom)

Scientific classification
- Kingdom: Animalia
- Phylum: Arthropoda
- Clade: Pancrustacea
- Class: Insecta
- Order: Lepidoptera
- Superfamily: Noctuoidea
- Family: Noctuidae
- Genus: Acronicta
- Species: A. superans

Binomial name
- Acronicta superans Guenée, 1852

= Acronicta superans =

Species of moth

Acronicta superans, the splendid dagger moth, is a moth of the family Noctuidae. The species was first described by Achille Guenée in 1852.

The wingspan is 40–45 mm. Adults are on wing from May to August depending on the location.
