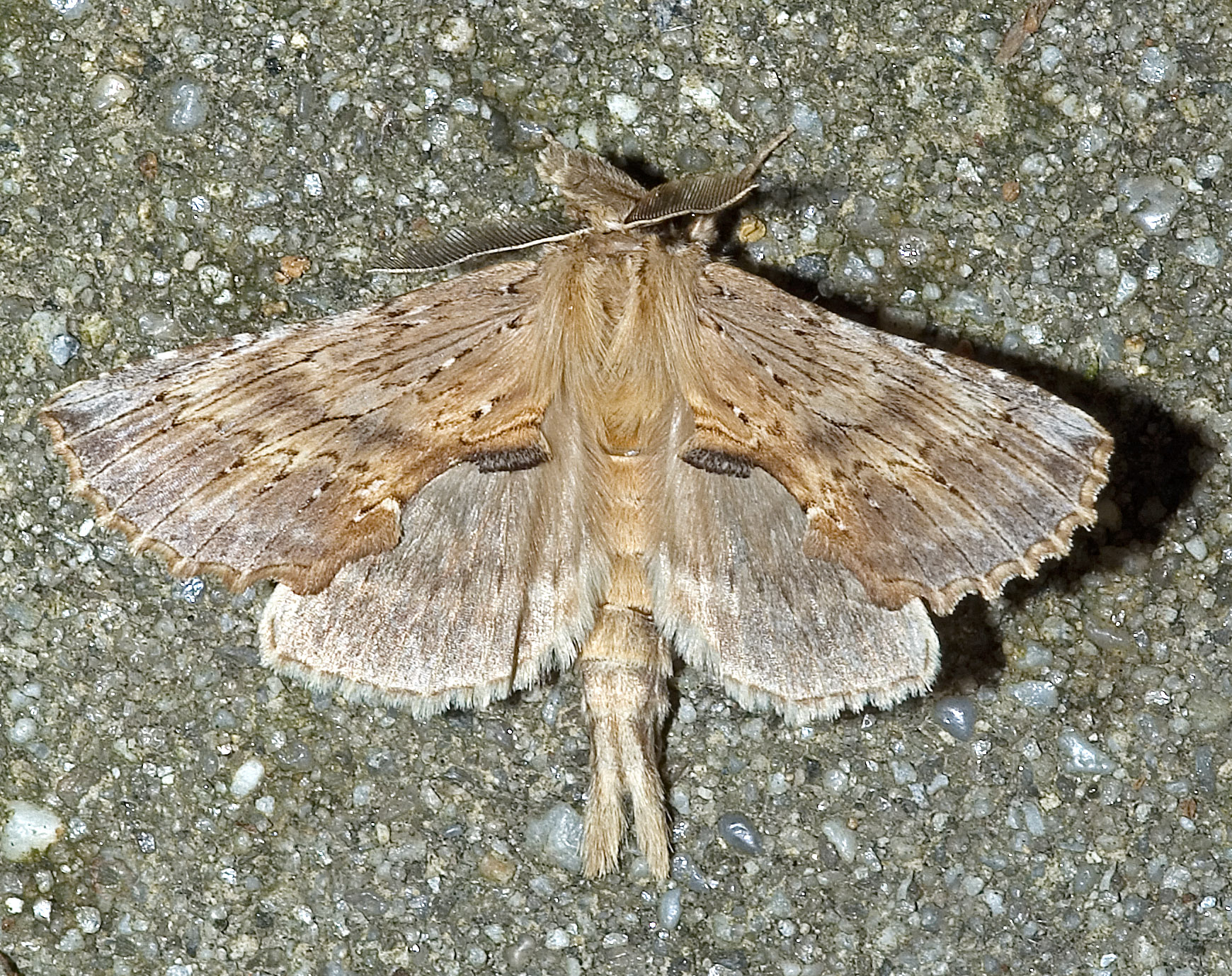
- Pterostoma palpina

Scientific classification
- Kingdom: Animalia
- Phylum: Arthropoda
- Clade: Pancrustacea
- Class: Insecta
- Order: Lepidoptera
- Superfamily: Noctuoidea
- Family: Notodontidae
- Subfamily: Ptilodoninae

Genera
- Over 20, see text

= Ptilodoninae =

Subfamily of moths

Ptilodoninae is a subfamily of the moth family Notodontidae. They are sometimes merged into the Notodontinae. The genus list is preliminary, as not all Notodontidae have been assigned to subfamilies yet.

== Genera ==
- Allodonta
- Allodontoides
- Epinotodonta
- Epodonta
- Hagapteryx
- Hexafrenum
- Higena
- Himeropteryx
- Hiradonta
- Hyperaeschrella
- Jurivalentinia
- Lophontosia
- Megaceramis
- Microphalera
- Odontosia
- Odontosina
- Pterostoma
- Ptilodon
- Ptilodontosia
- Ptilophora
- Spatalina
- Togepteryx
- Media related to Ptilodoninae at Wikimedia Commons
