= Ptilophora =

Ptilophora may refer to:

- Microseris (syn. Ptilophora), a genus of plants in the sunflower family
- Ptilophora (alga), a genus of red alga in the family Gelidiaceae
- Ptilophora (moth), a genus of moth in the family Notodontidae
