= Ptilophora rufula =

Scientific classification
- Kingdom: Animalia
- Phylum: Arthropoda
- Clade: Pancrustacea
- Class: Insecta
- Order: Lepidoptera
- Superfamily: Noctuoidea
- Family: Notodontidae
- Genus: Ptilophora
- Species: P. rufula

Binomial name
- Ptilophora rufula Kobayashi, 1994

Synonyms
- Ptilophora jezoensis rufula

Species of moth

Ptilophora rufula is a moth of the family Notodontidae. It is known from Taiwan.
