= Ptilophora nohirae =

Scientific classification
- Domain: Eukaryota
- Kingdom: Animalia
- Phylum: Arthropoda
- Class: Insecta
- Order: Lepidoptera
- Superfamily: Noctuoidea
- Family: Notodontidae
- Genus: Ptilophora
- Species: P. nohirae

Binomial name
- Ptilophora nohirae Matsumura, 1920

Species of moth

Ptilophora nohirae is a moth of the family Notodontidae. It is known from Japan, Korea and the Russian Far East.

The wingspan is 30–33 mm.

The larvae feed on Carpinus japonica.
