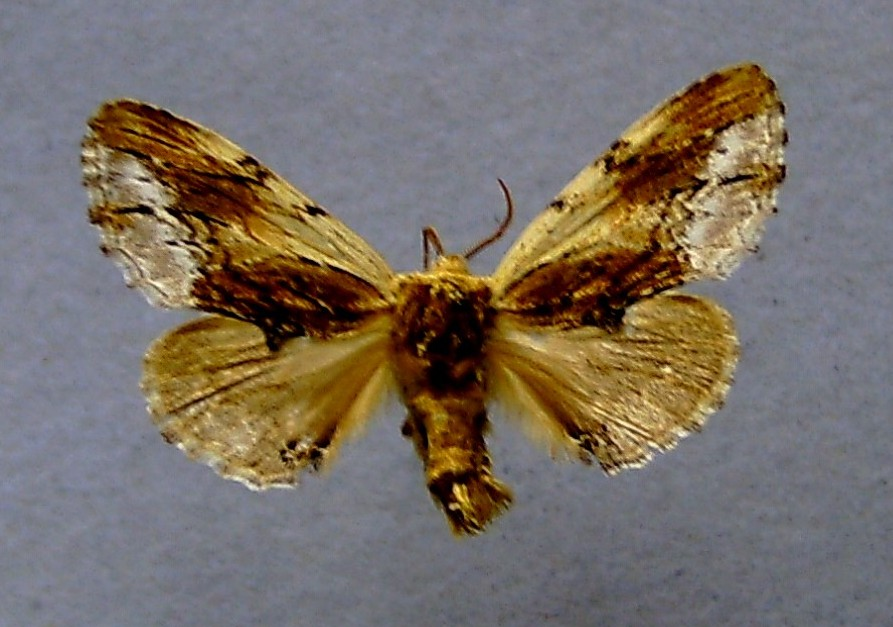

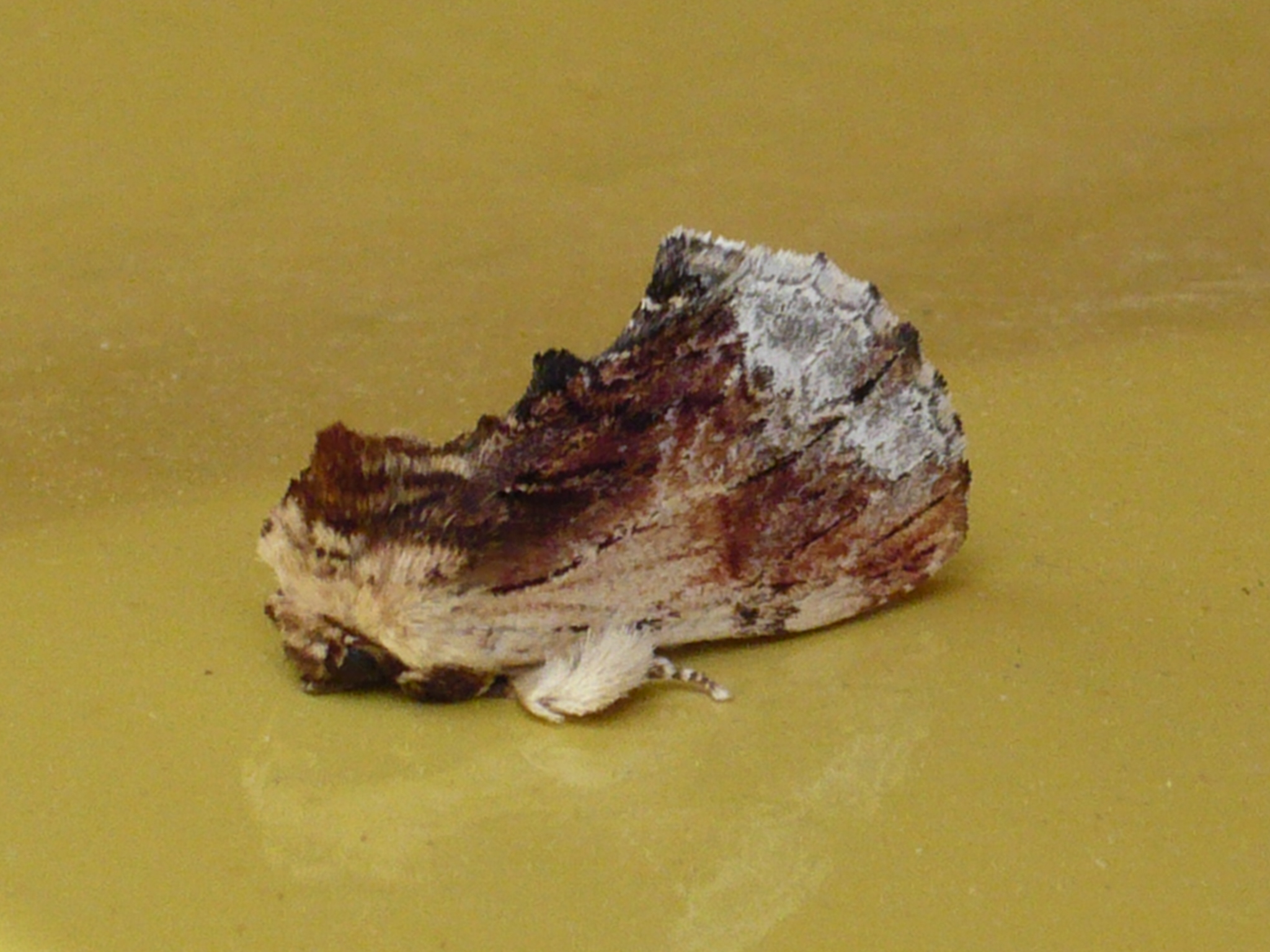

Scientific classification
- Kingdom: Animalia
- Phylum: Arthropoda
- Class: Insecta
- Order: Lepidoptera
- Superfamily: Noctuoidea
- Family: Notodontidae
- Genus: Ptilodon
- Species: P. cucullina

Binomial name
- Ptilodon cucullina (Denis & Schiffermüller, 1775)

= Ptilodon cucullina =

Species of moth

Ptilodon cucullina, the maple prominent, is a moth of the family Notodontidae. The species was first described by Michael Denis and Ignaz Schiffermüller in 1775. It is found in Europe.

The wingspan is 35–40 mm. The moths are on wing from May to July depending on the location.

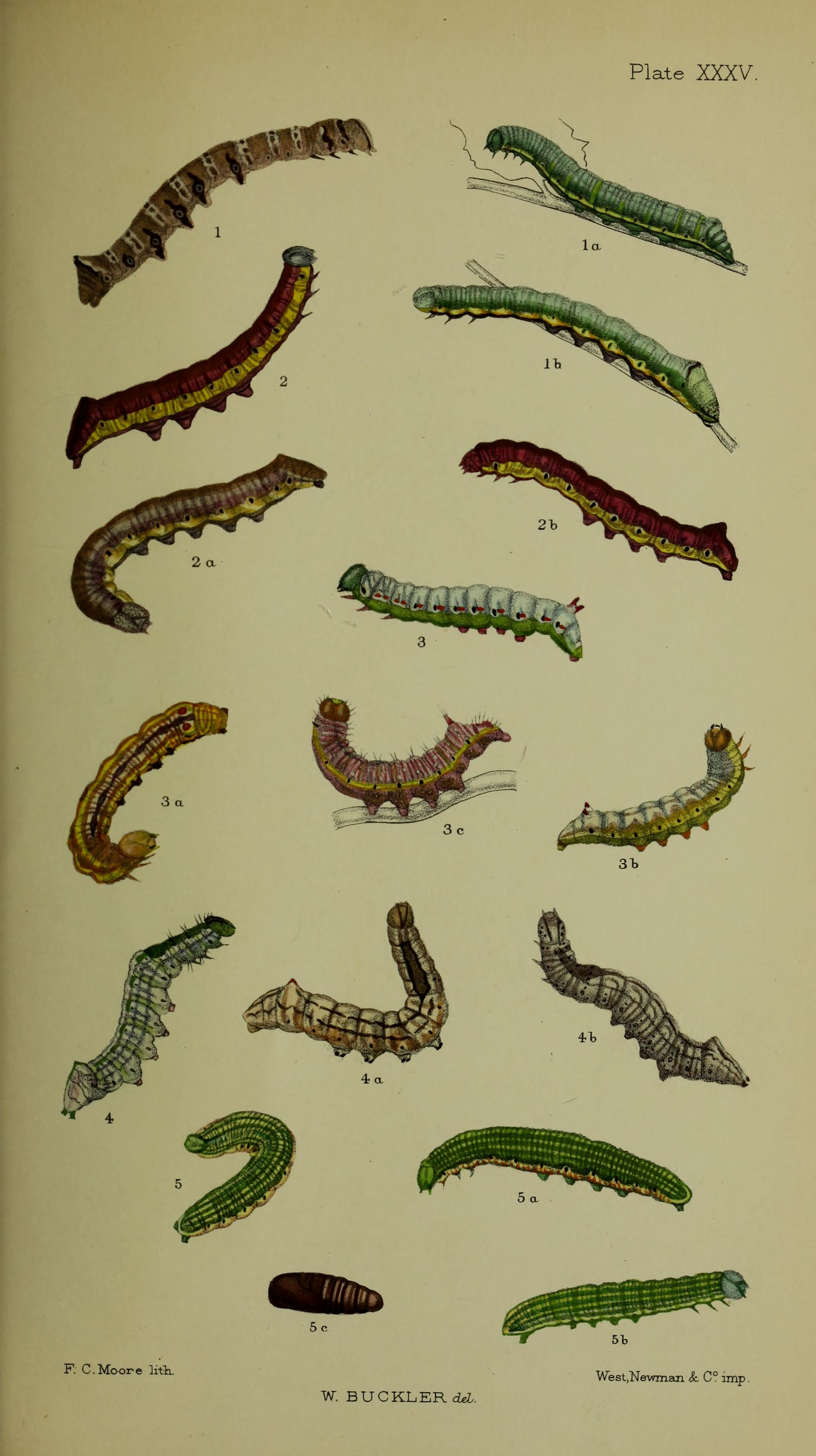
Figs. 4, 4a, 4b larvae after last moult

The larvae feed on Acer campestris and sometimes Acer pseudoplatanus.
