= Ptilophora horieaurea =

Scientific classification
- Kingdom: Animalia
- Phylum: Arthropoda
- Clade: Pancrustacea
- Class: Insecta
- Order: Lepidoptera
- Superfamily: Noctuoidea
- Family: Notodontidae
- Genus: Ptilophora
- Species: P. horieaurea

Binomial name
- Ptilophora horieaurea Kishida & Kobayashi, 2002

Species of moth

Ptilophora horieaurea is a moth of the family Notodontidae. It is known from Sichuan in China.
