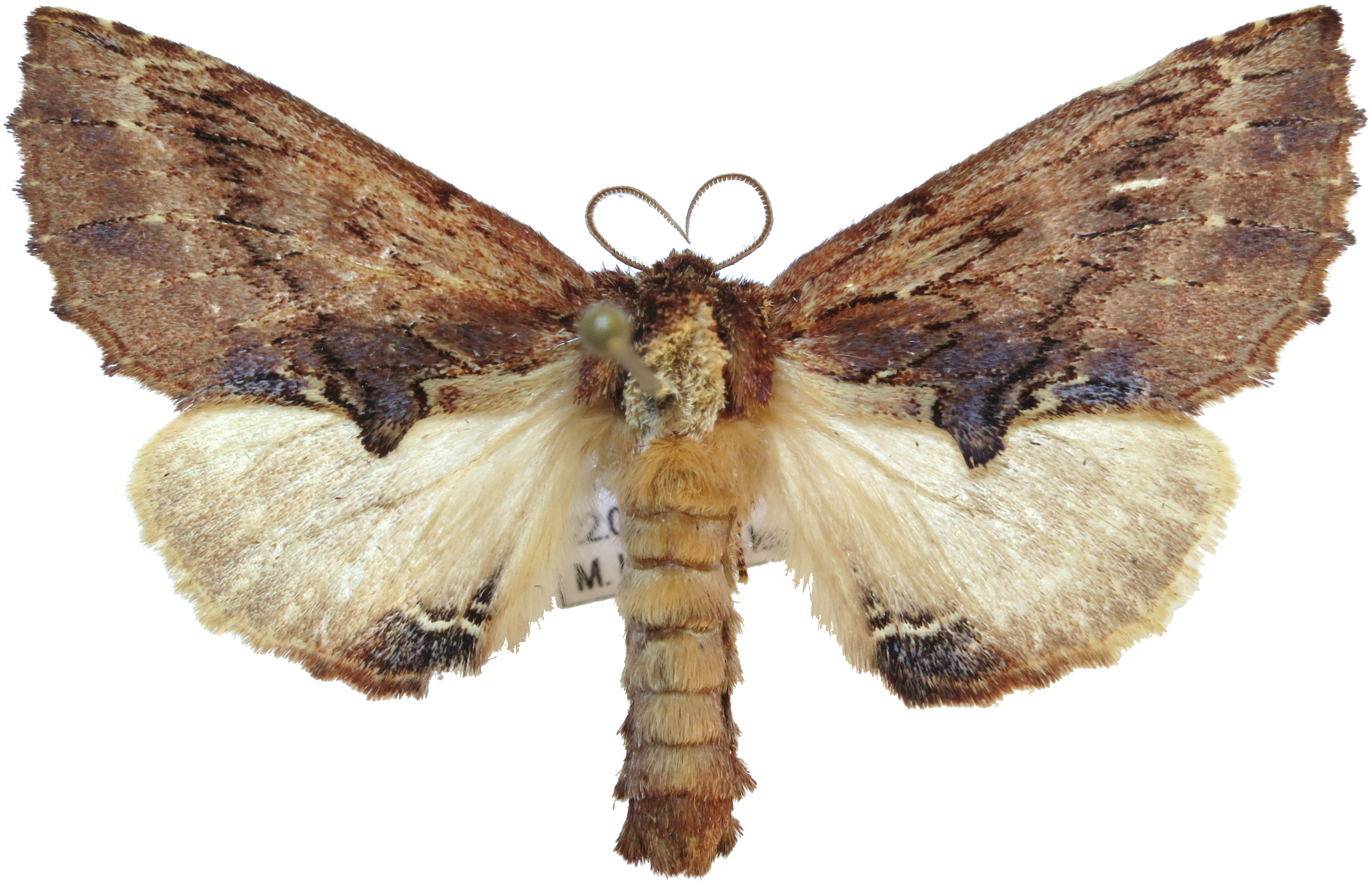
- P. capucina - Malopolskie, Poland
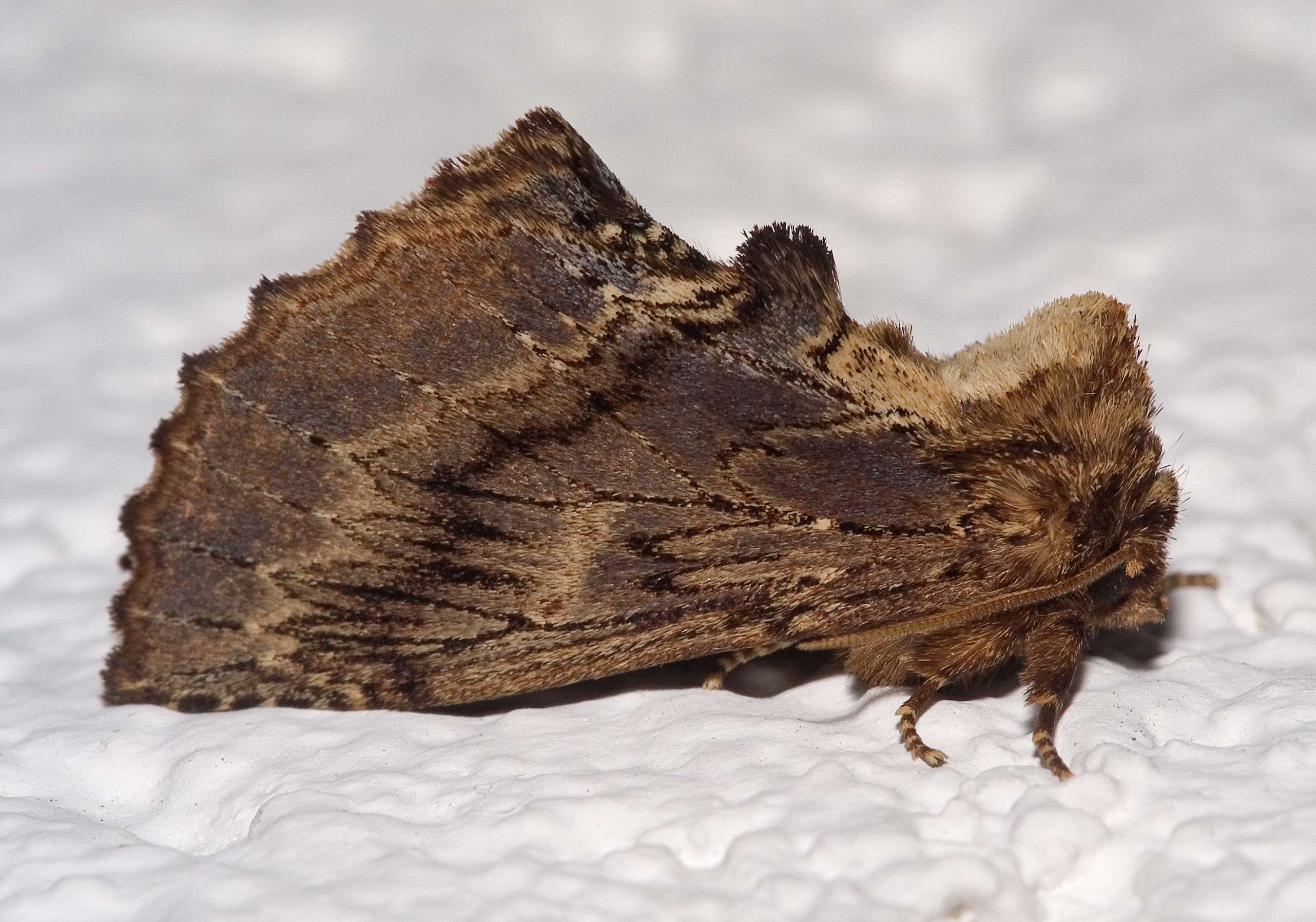

Scientific classification
- Kingdom: Animalia
- Phylum: Arthropoda
- Class: Insecta
- Order: Lepidoptera
- Superfamily: Noctuoidea
- Family: Notodontidae
- Genus: Ptilodon
- Species: P. capucina

Binomial name
- Ptilodon capucina (Linnaeus, 1758)

Synonyms
- Ptilodon americana (Harvey, 1877)

= Coxcomb prominent =

Species of moth

The coxcomb prominent (Ptilodon capucina) is a moth of the family Notodontidae. It is a common species throughout the Palearctic realm from Ireland to Japan. It was first described by Carl Linnaeus in his 1758 10th edition of Systema Naturae.

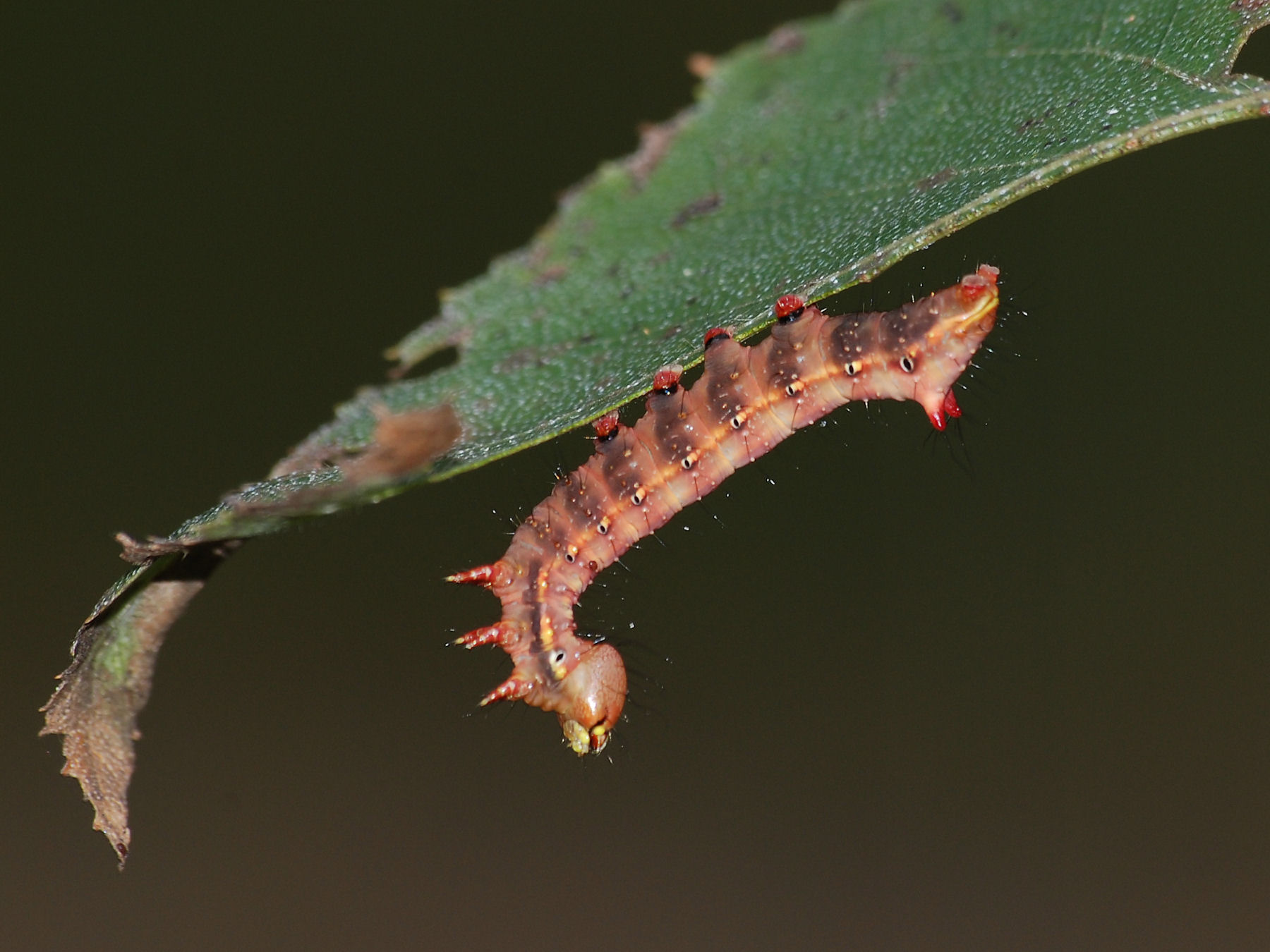
Caterpillar

This species has brown forewings, varying considerably in tone, with indistinct darker markings. The hindwings are buffish with a black spot at the tornus. At rest, the species has a very distinctive profile with tufts of hairs protruding upwards from the thorax and the hind edge of the forewings (this latter feature shared with other prominents). The margins of the forewings are also wavy. This rather "lumpy" appearance has led to the rather fanciful comparison to the comb on a cock's head. Seitz - Thorax and forewing reddish grey, the ground lighter or darker, the two transverse bands narrow, black and very sharply dentate, strongly approximated at the tooth of scales of the hind margin; beyond the postdiscal band a whitish submarginal band, often but feebly indicated.Hindwing paler, yellowish brown or greyish brown, with black anal spot traversed by a transverse whitish line, and with a slightly indicated pale postdiscal band. Distributed from Northern Spain and Central Italy throughout Europe, northward to Scotland and Scandinavia, eastward throughout Siberia to Corea and Japan. —giraffina Hbn.[ aberration] is a dark form with the ground-colour of the forewing red-brown to blackish; it occurs throughout the distribution-area of camelina [ capucina ], being rare in the West, but commoner in Japan. — Egg strongly globose, whitish.Larva at first green with glossy black head and numerous deep black dots which bear long hairs. Fullfed greenish to pale brown-red; on abdominal segment 8 two dark red pointed tubercles. Stigmata black, behind each a red spot. May—September on various deciduous trees, particularly Birch and Lime, at first gregarious.At rest the head is raised in Sphinx-shape. Pupa dark red-brown, the pointed anal end with several thin spines; at the foot of trees in a cell in the ground. Moth in 2 broods in the South, April-—May and July–August; from Central Germany northward one brood only, April to June. One of the commonest Prominents.

== Biology ==
Two broods are produced each year with adults on the wing in May and June and again in August and September. This moth flies at night and is attracted to light.

The larva is green or brown with a yellow stripe down each side and two red humps at the rear end. It is polyphagous and feeds on a wide variety of deciduous trees and shrubs (see list below). The species overwinters as a pupa.

1. The flight season refers to the British Isles. This may vary in other parts of the range.

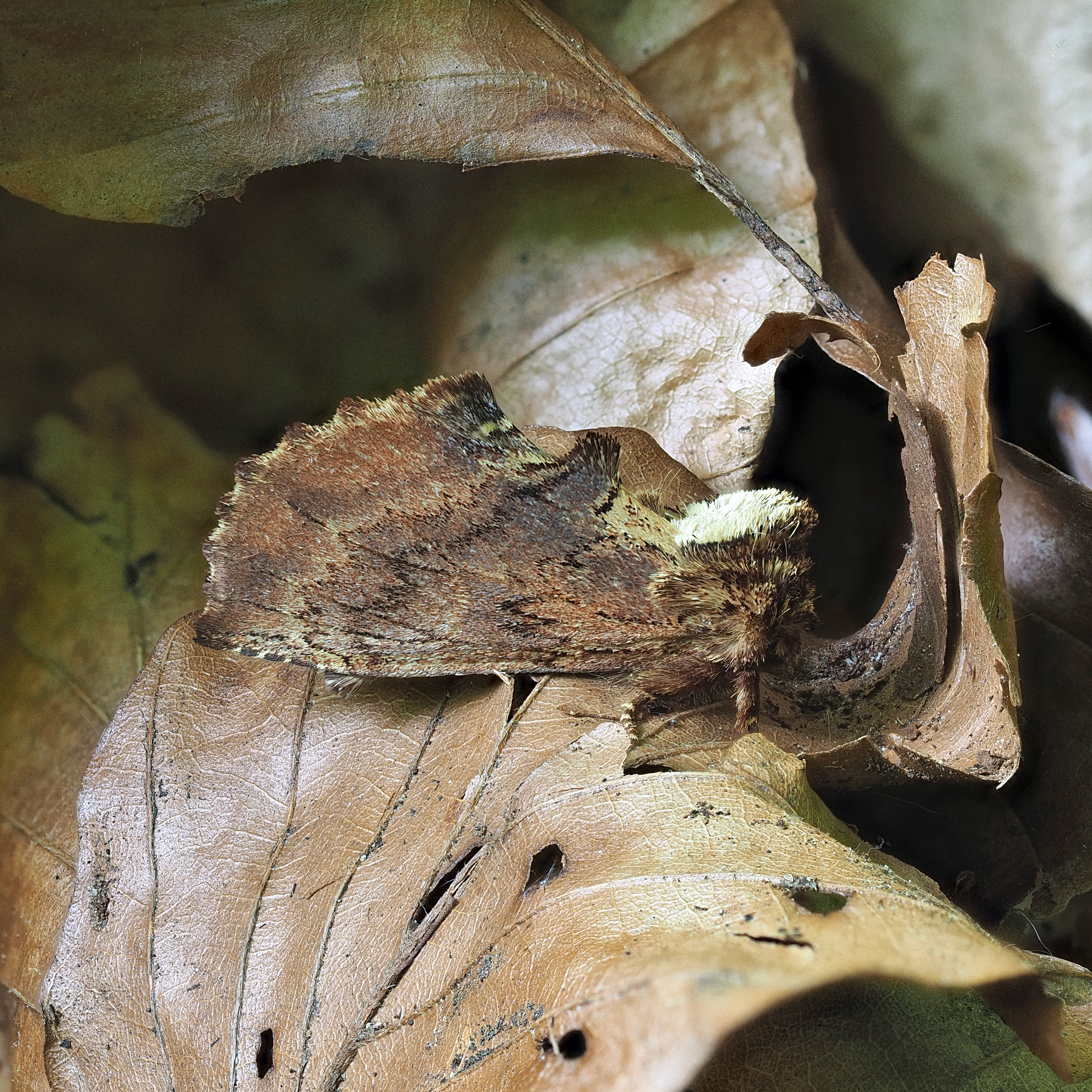
Coxcomb prominent in Wales; 2021

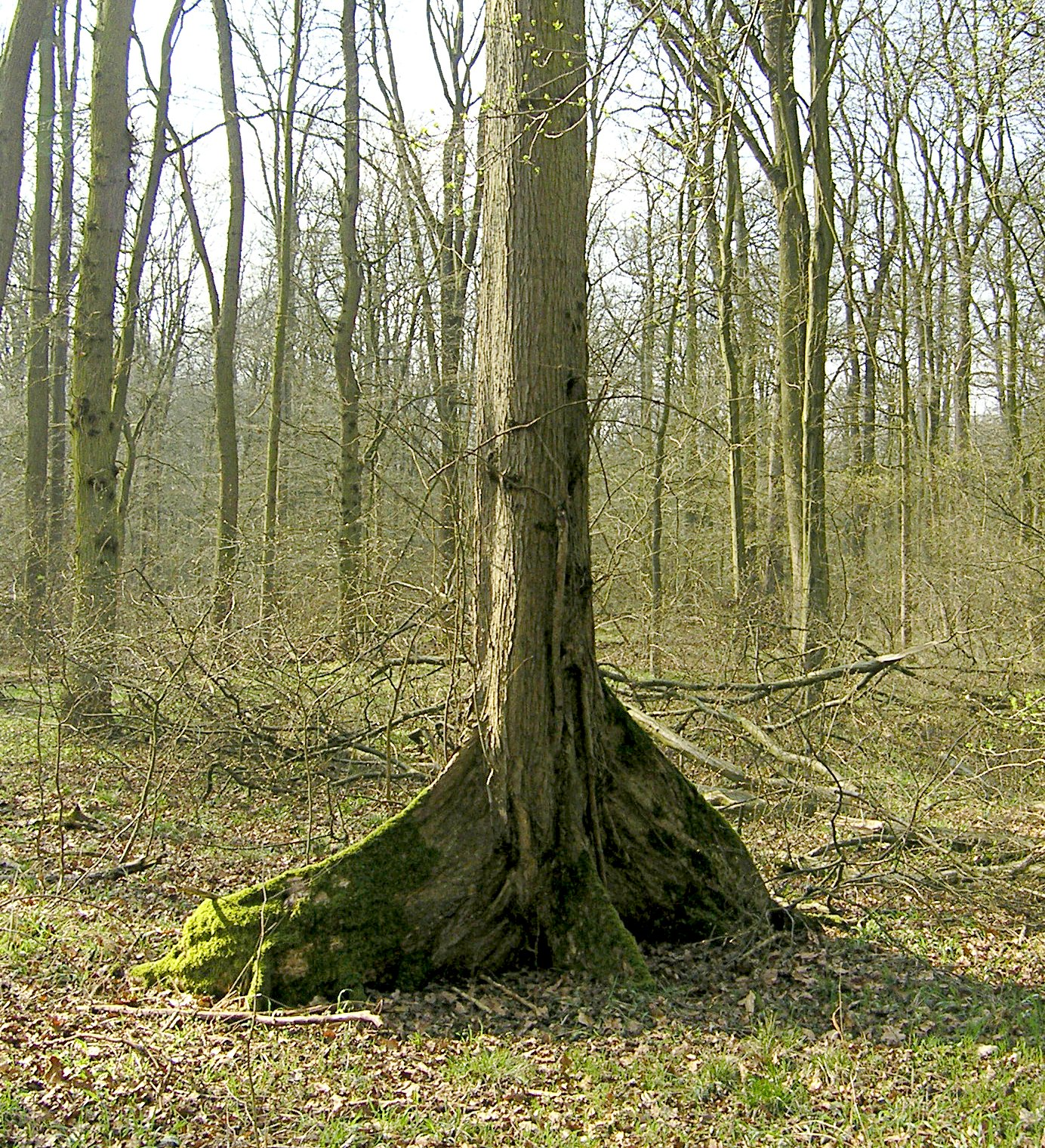
Habitat

== Recorded food plants ==
For detail see Robinson et al., 2010.

- Acer - Norway maple
- Alnus - alder
- Betula - birch
- Crataegus - hawthorn
- Malus - apple
- Populus - poplar
- Prunus - bird cherry
- Quercus - pedunculate oak
- Rosa - rose
- Salix - willow
- Sorbus - rowan
- Tilia - lime
- Ulmus - European white elm
