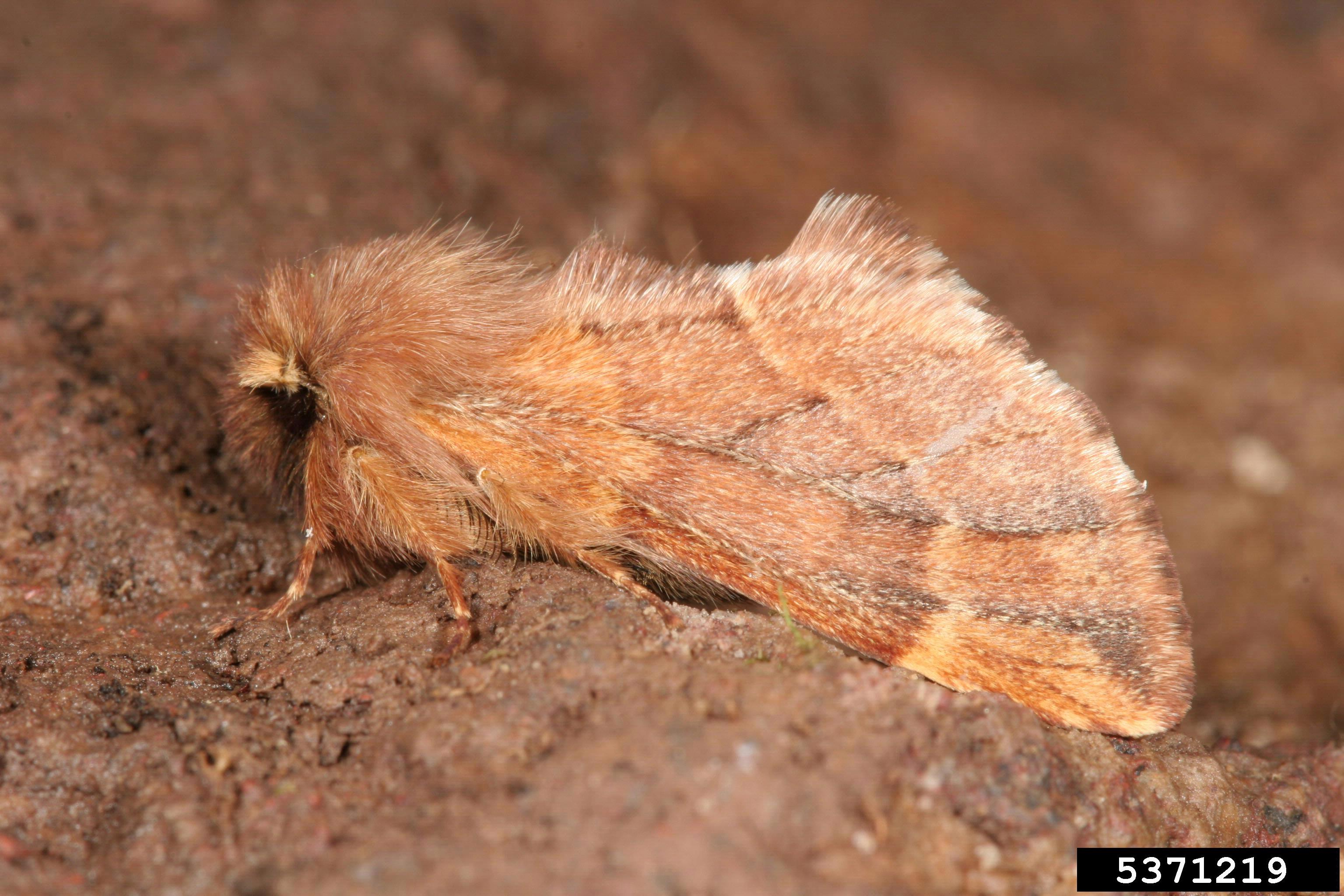

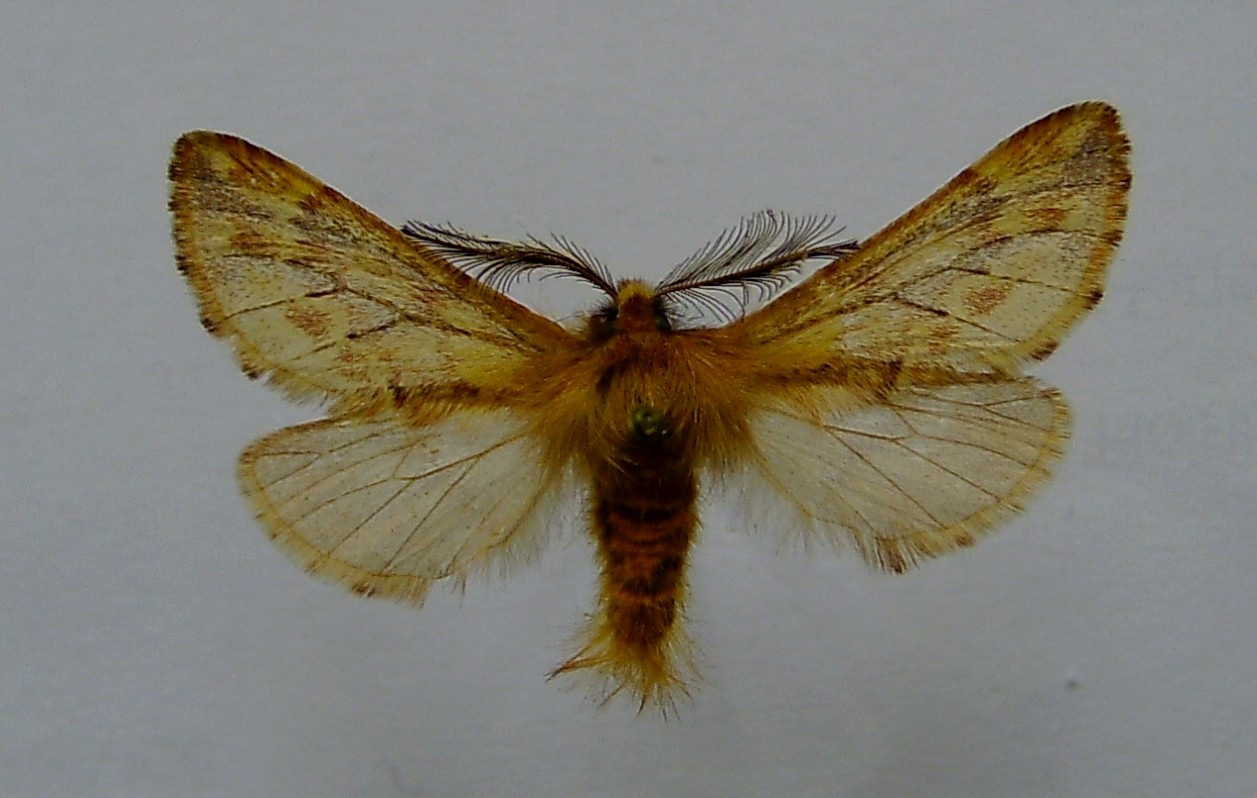

Scientific classification
- Domain: Eukaryota
- Kingdom: Animalia
- Phylum: Arthropoda
- Class: Insecta
- Order: Lepidoptera
- Superfamily: Noctuoidea
- Family: Notodontidae
- Genus: Ptilophora
- Species: P. plumigera

Binomial name
- Ptilophora plumigera (Denis & Schiffermüller, 1775)

= Ptilophora plumigera =

Species of moth

Ptilophora plumigera, the plumed prominent, is a moth of the family Notodontidae. The species was first described by Michael Denis and Ignaz Schiffermüller in 1775. It is found in the southern parts of the Palearctic realm.

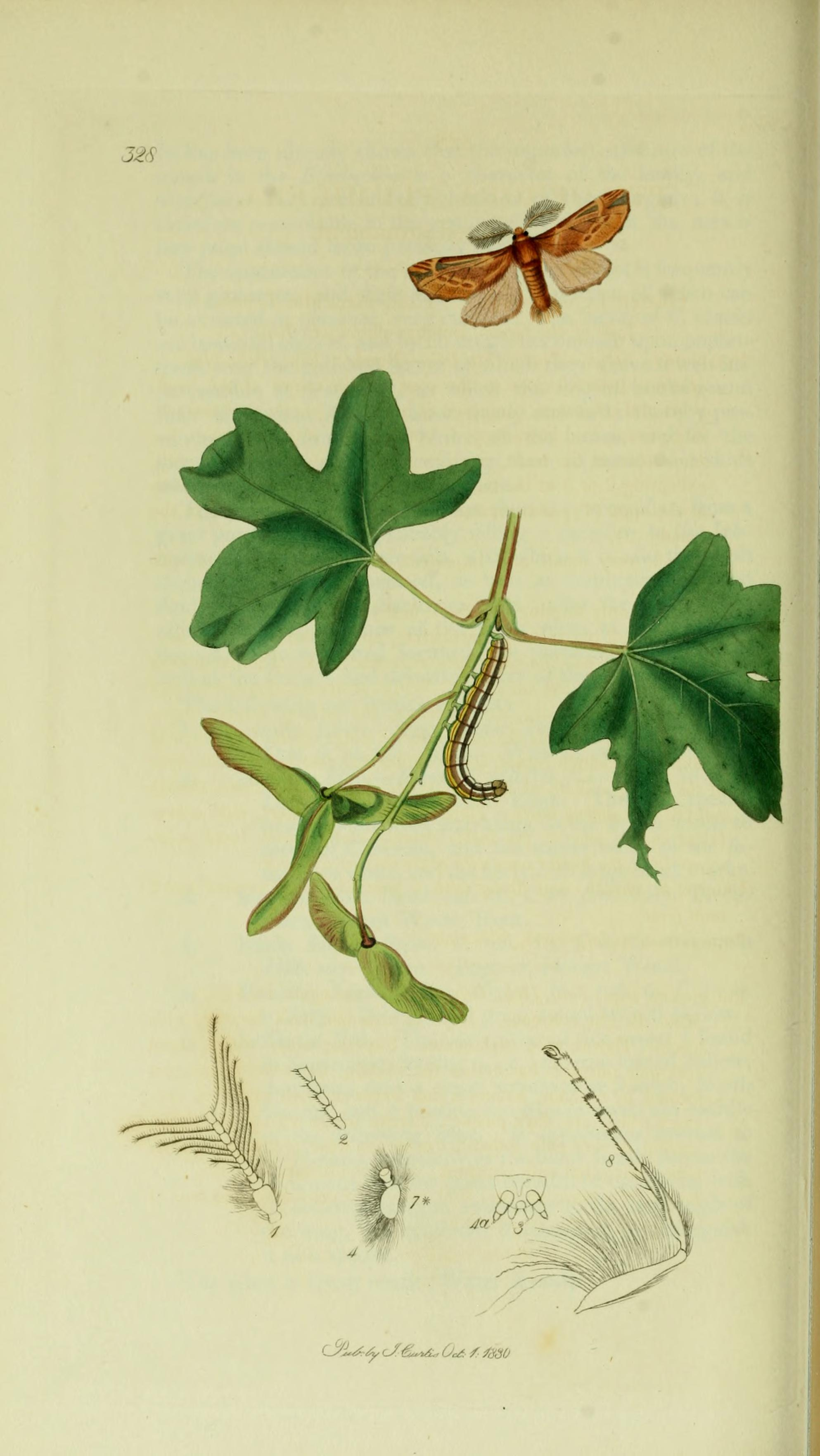
Illustration from John Curtis's British Entomology Volume 5

The wingspan is 33–44 mm. The moth flies from October to November depending on the location.

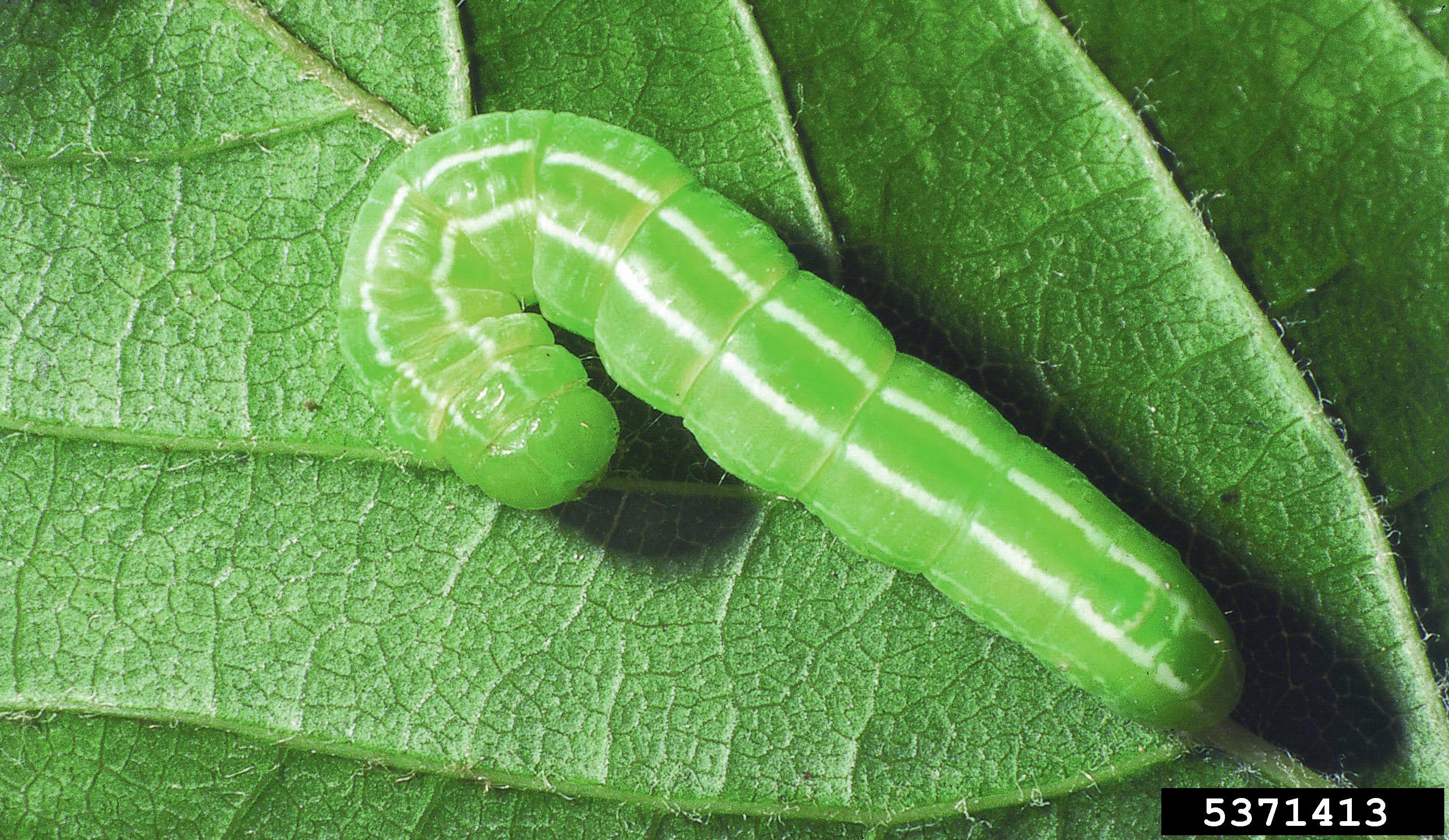
Caterpillar

The larvae feed on maple.
