= Ptilophora ala =

Scientific classification
- Kingdom: Animalia
- Phylum: Arthropoda
- Clade: Pancrustacea
- Class: Insecta
- Order: Lepidoptera
- Superfamily: Noctuoidea
- Family: Notodontidae
- Genus: Ptilophora
- Species: P. ala

Binomial name
- Ptilophora ala Schintlmeister & Fang, 2001

Synonyms
- Ptilophora jezoensis ala Schintlmeister and Fang, 2001; Ptilophora fuscior Kishida and Kobayashi, 2002

Species of moth

Ptilophora ala is a moth of the family Notodontidae. It is known from Shaanxi and Sichuan in China.
