= Hyperaeschrella dentata =

Scientific classification
- Kingdom: Animalia
- Phylum: Arthropoda
- Clade: Pancrustacea
- Class: Insecta
- Order: Lepidoptera
- Superfamily: Noctuoidea
- Family: Notodontidae
- Genus: Hyperaeschrella
- Species: H. dentata

Binomial name
- Hyperaeschrella dentata Hampson, 1892

Species of moth

Hyperaeschrella dentata is a moth of the family Notodontidae first described by George Hampson in 1892. It is found in Sri Lanka.

Host plant includes Nephelium lappaceum.

== Subspecies ==
- Hyperaeschrella dentata kosemponica Strand, 1915
