= Ptilophora jezoensis =

Scientific classification
- Kingdom: Animalia
- Phylum: Arthropoda
- Clade: Pancrustacea
- Class: Insecta
- Order: Lepidoptera
- Superfamily: Noctuoidea
- Family: Notodontidae
- Genus: Ptilophora
- Species: P. jezoensis

Binomial name
- Ptilophora jezoensis (Matsumura, 1920)

Synonyms
- Ptilophoroides jezoensis Matsumura, 1920

Species of moth

Ptilophora jezoensis is a moth of the family Notodontidae. It is known from Japan and the Russian Far East.

The wingspan is 30–35 mm.

== Subspecies ==
- Ptilophora jezoensis jezoensis (Japan)
- Ptilophora jezoensis sutchana O.Bang-Haas, 1927 (Amur, Primorye)
