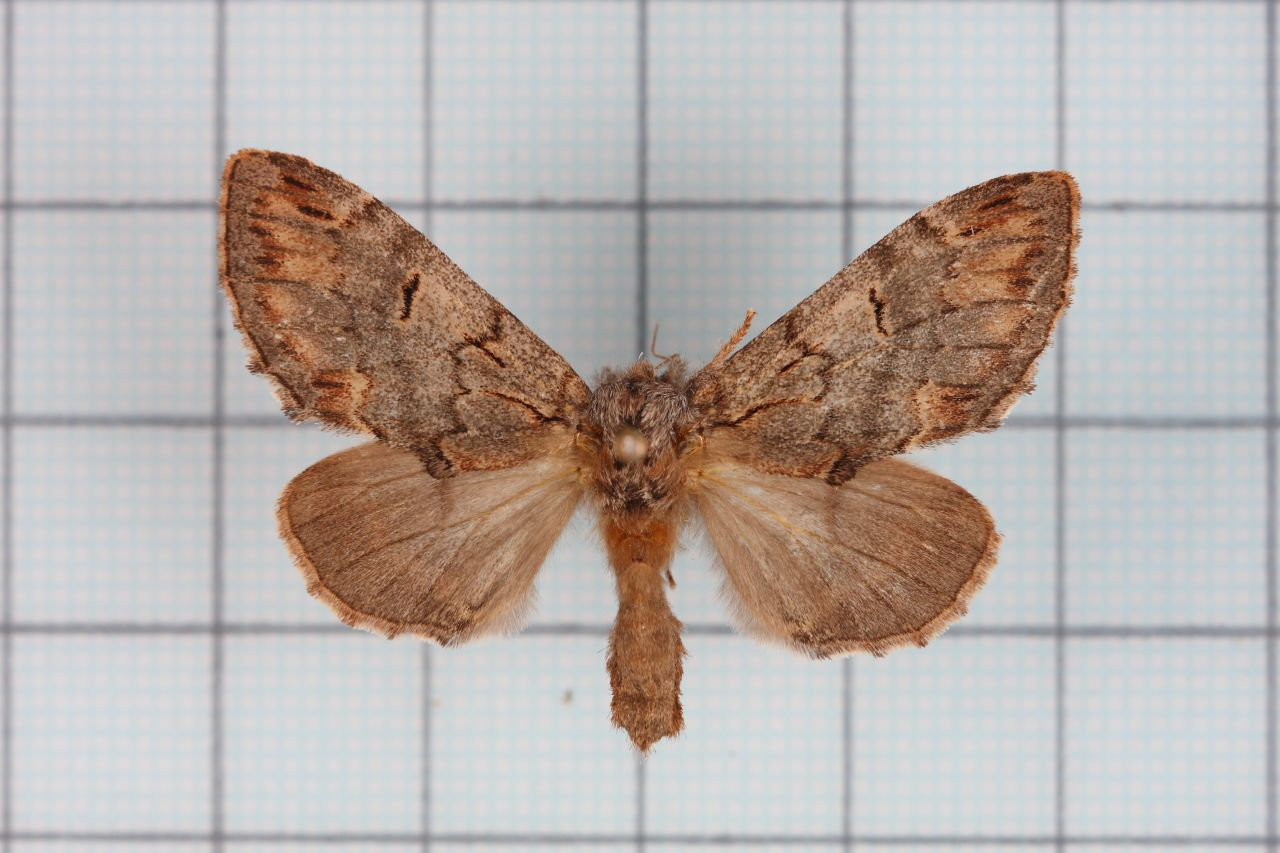

Scientific classification
- Kingdom: Animalia
- Phylum: Arthropoda
- Clade: Pancrustacea
- Class: Insecta
- Order: Lepidoptera
- Superfamily: Noctuoidea
- Family: Notodontidae
- Genus: Hyperaeschrella
- Species: H. nigribasis

Binomial name
- Hyperaeschrella nigribasis (Hampson, 1893)

Synonyms
- Allodontoides costiguttatus Matsumura, 1925; Hyperaeschrella kosemponica Strand, 1916

= Hyperaeschrella nigribasis =

Species of moth

Hyperaeschrella nigribasis is a moth in the family Notodontidae first described by George Hampson in 1893. It is found in Taiwan, southern China, Vietnam, Thailand, Myanmar, Assam, Sikkim, Nepal, Pakistan and Afghanistan. The wingspan is 33–40 mm.
