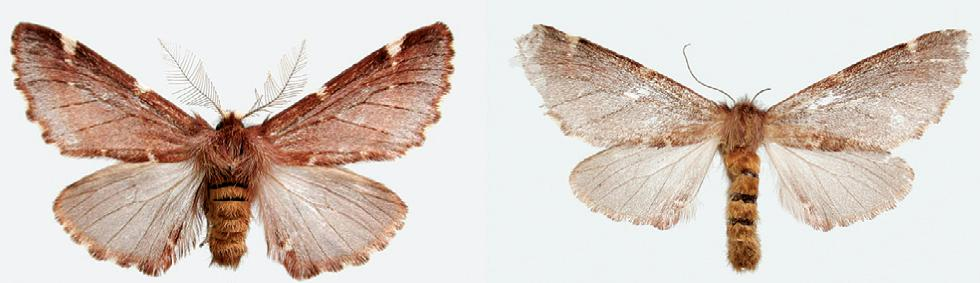
- Ptilophora nanlingensis, male (left), female (right)

Scientific classification
- Domain: Eukaryota
- Kingdom: Animalia
- Phylum: Arthropoda
- Class: Insecta
- Order: Lepidoptera
- Superfamily: Noctuoidea
- Family: Notodontidae
- Genus: Ptilophora
- Species: P. nanlingensis

Binomial name
- Ptilophora nanlingensis Chen L et al, 2010

= Ptilophora nanlingensis =

Species of moth

Ptilophora nanlingensis is a moth of the family Notodontidae. It is known from Guangdong in China.

The length of the forewings is 15–18 mm for males and about 17 mm for females. Adults were collected at light near 10 °C the late autumn.

== Etymology ==
The specific name is derived from the type locality: Nanling Nature Reserve, Shaoguan City, Guangdong Province.
