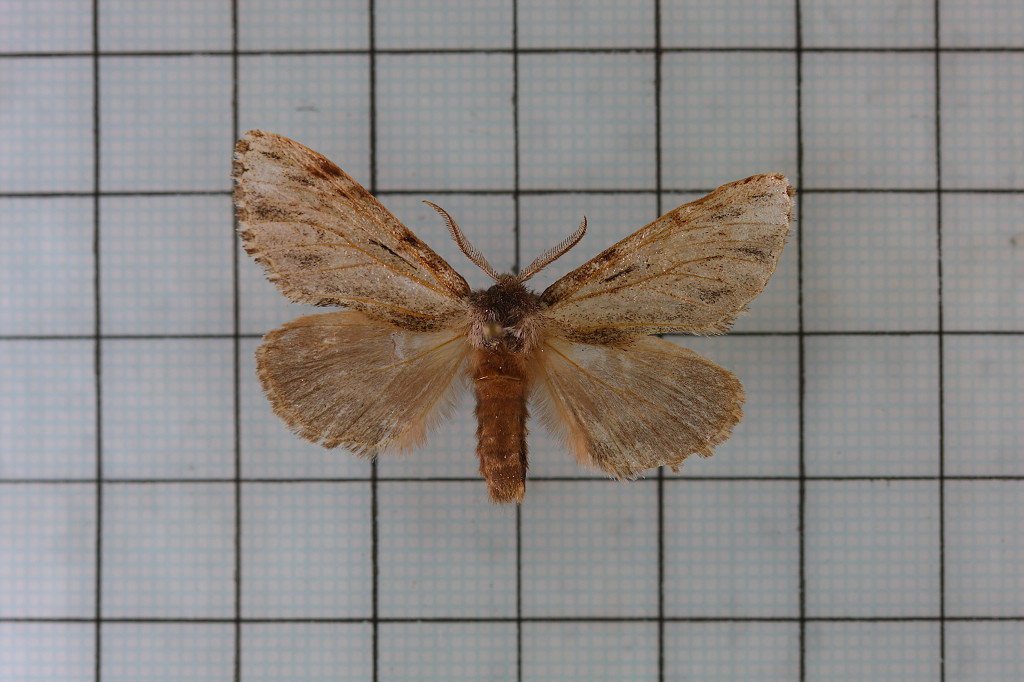
- Microphalera grisea yoshimotoi
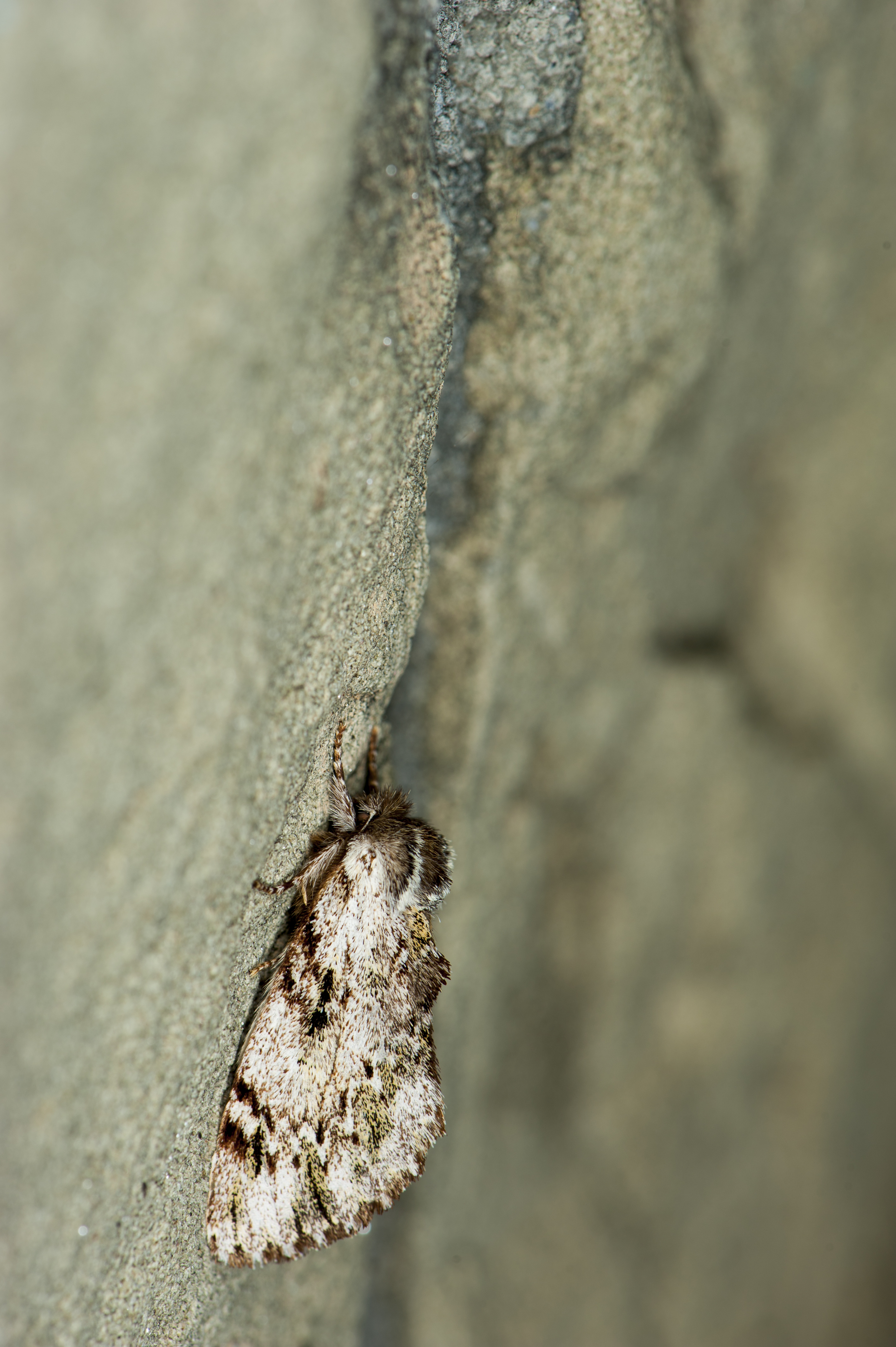

Scientific classification
- Kingdom: Animalia
- Phylum: Arthropoda
- Class: Insecta
- Order: Lepidoptera
- Superfamily: Noctuoidea
- Family: Notodontidae
- Genus: Microphalera; Butler, 1885
- Species: M. grisea

Binomial name
- Microphalera grisea Butler, 1885

= Microphalera =

Genus of moths

Microphalera is a monotypic moth genus of the family Notodontidae. Its only species, Microphalera grisea, is found in Japan and Taiwan. Both the genus and species were first described by Arthur Gardiner Butler in 1885.

The wingspan is 28–43 mm.

== Subspecies ==
- Microphalera grisea grisea (Japan)
- Microphalera grisea yoshimotoi Kishida, 1984 (Taiwan)
