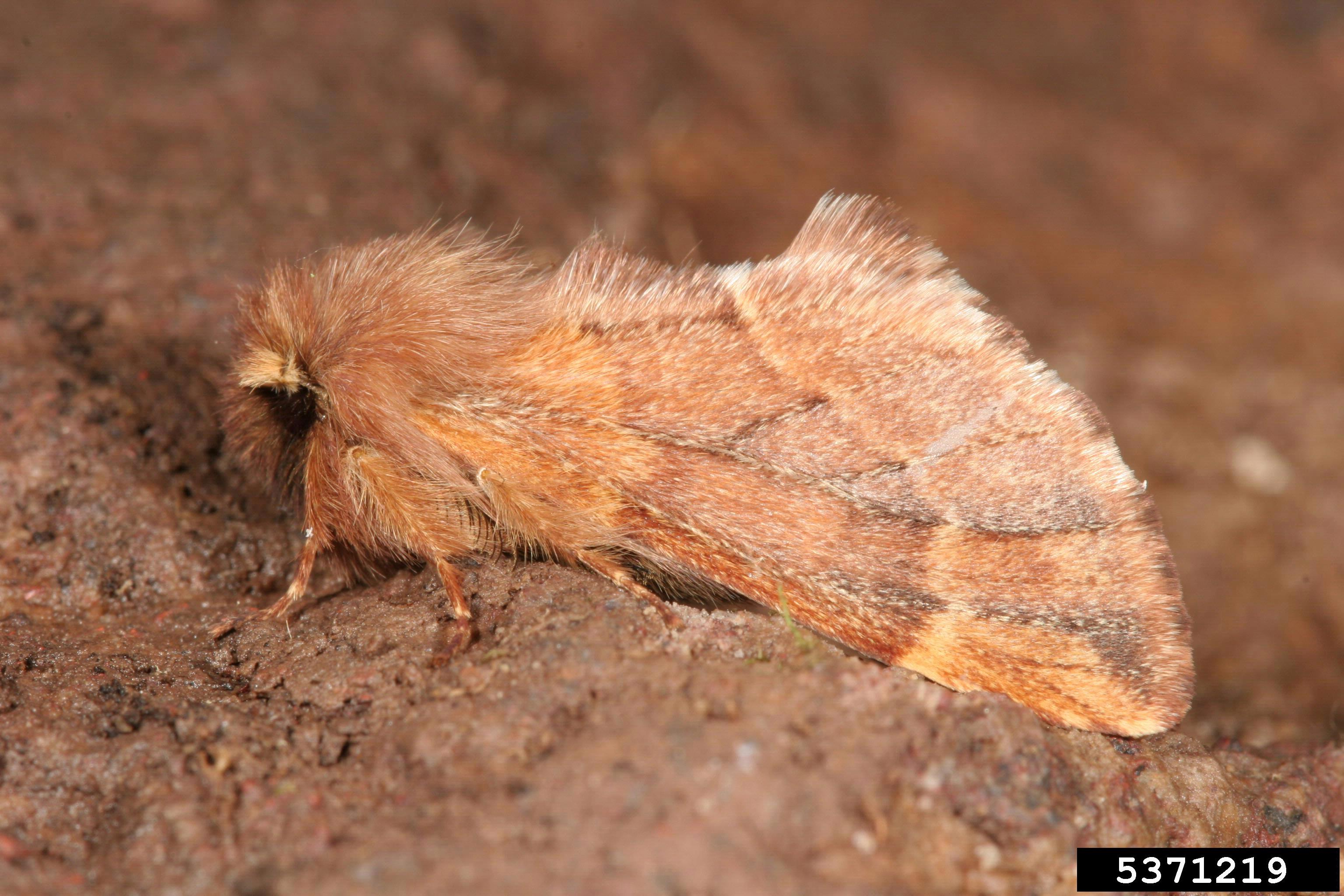
- Ptilophora plumigera

Scientific classification
- Domain: Eukaryota
- Kingdom: Animalia
- Phylum: Arthropoda
- Class: Insecta
- Order: Lepidoptera
- Superfamily: Noctuoidea
- Family: Notodontidae
- Subfamily: Ptilodoninae
- Genus: Ptilophora; Stephens, 1828

Synonyms
- Ptilophoroides Matsumura, 1920

= Ptilophora (moth) =

Genus of moths

Ptilophora is a genus of moths of the family Notodontidae The genus was described by Stephens in 1828.

== Selected species ==
- Ptilophora ala (Schintlmeister and Fang, 2001)
- Ptilophora horieaurea Kishida and Kobayashi, 2002
- Ptilophora jezoensis (Matsumura, 1920)
- Ptilophora nanlingensis Chen L et al., 2010
- Ptilophora nohirae Matsumura, 1920
- Ptilophora plumigera (Denis & Schiffermüller, 1775)
- Ptilophora rufula Kobayashi, 1994
