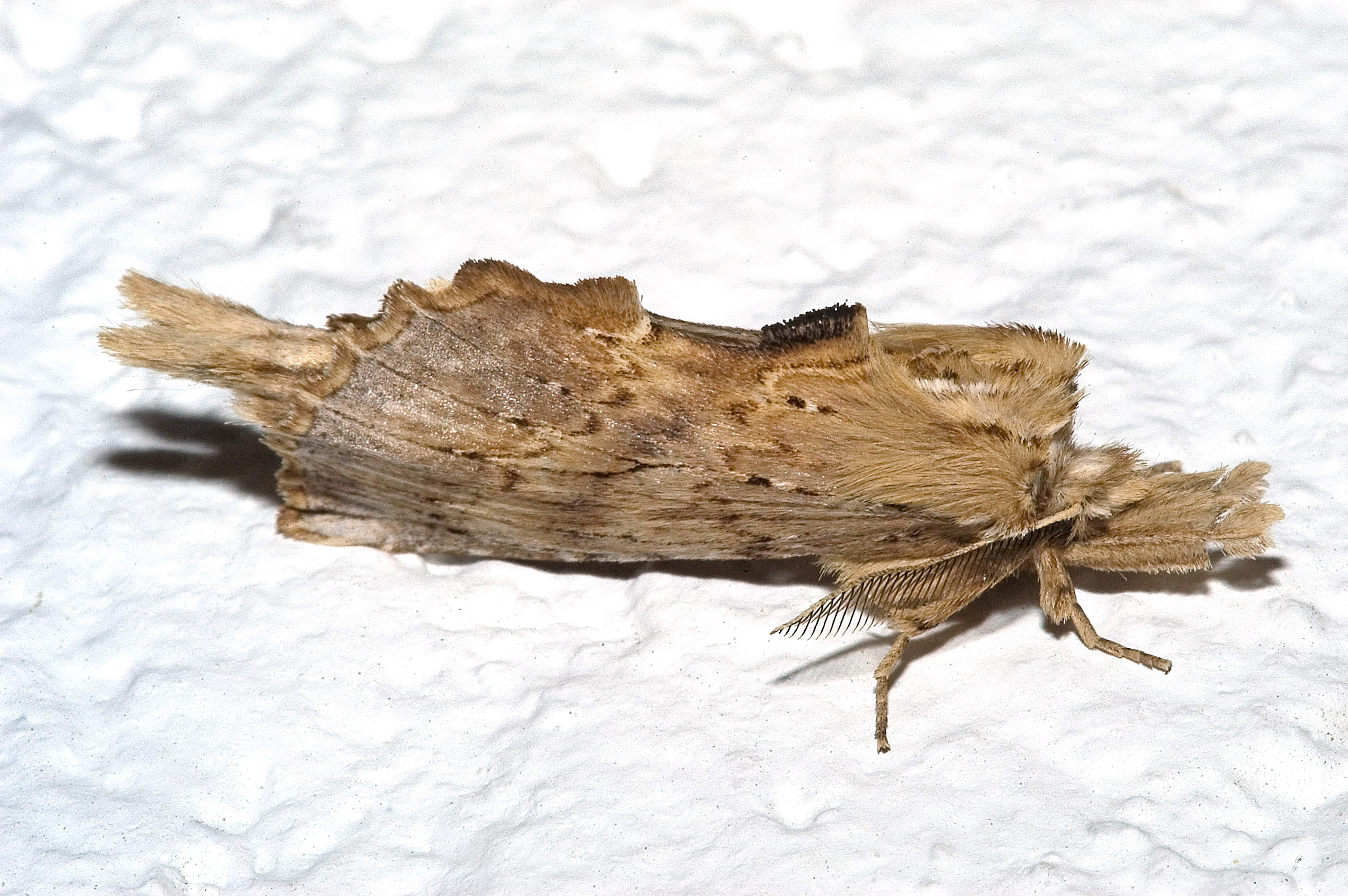

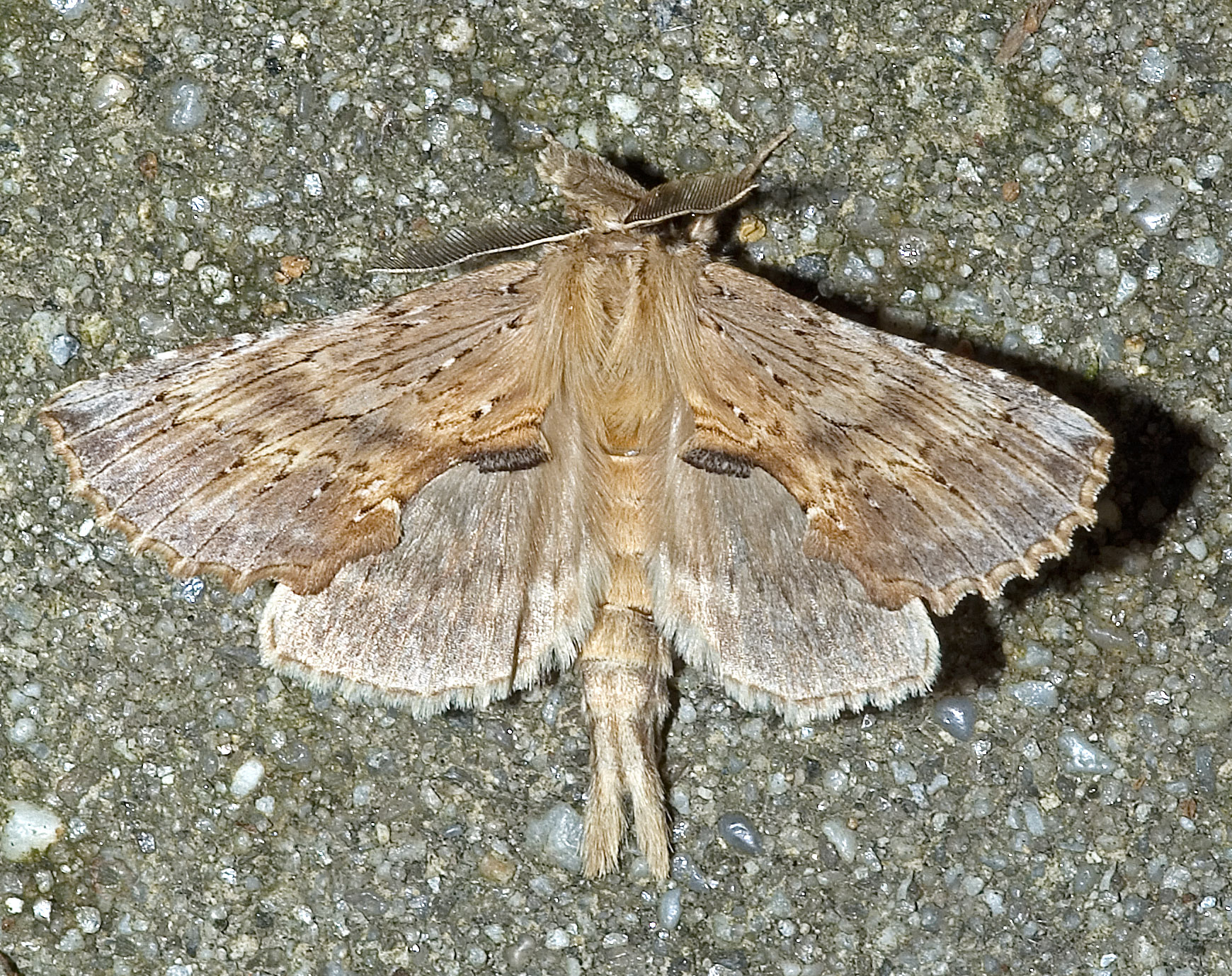

Scientific classification
- Kingdom: Animalia
- Phylum: Arthropoda
- Class: Insecta
- Order: Lepidoptera
- Superfamily: Noctuoidea
- Family: Notodontidae
- Genus: Pterostoma
- Species: P. palpina

Binomial name
- Pterostoma palpina (Clerck, 1759)

= Pterostoma palpina =

Species of moth

Pterostoma palpina, the pale prominent, is a moth from the family Notodontidae. The species was first described by Carl Alexander Clerck in 1759.

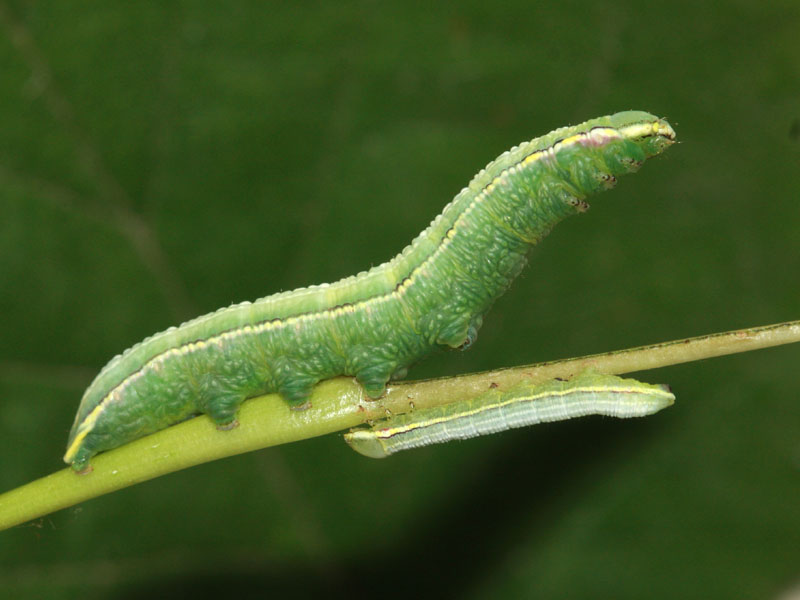
Larva

== Distribution ==
The moth can be found in Europe and Central Asia (Palearctic realm).

== Description ==
Pterostoma palpina has a wingspan of 35 to 52 mm. Beyond the black scaled tooth-like forewing projection the inner margin is notched. Long labial palps and tufts on the tail segment, give an elongated appearance. The antennae of the female are pectinated, but the teeth are shorter than those of the male; and the blackish streak on the wings are usually less defined. Except that some specimens are more strongly marked than others there is little variation. The larva is bluish green, with white dorsal and lateral lines, and a black edged yellow stripe along the spiracles; this stripe is marked with reddish on the three anterior segments. Seitz- The specimens of the first brood larger, predominantly grey-brown, those of the second brood smaller, light straw-colour. The transverse bands of the forewing only indicated by black vein-dots, the postdiscal band more complete than the other, being marked by double dots separated by white and placed in a slightly darkened shadowy band; all the veins more or less extended black; the proximal lobe of scales of the hind margin for the greater part black. Hindwing of the same ground-colour as the forewing, with lighter median band. — Distributed throughout Europe with the exception of Greece; in North-West. Africa, northern Asia Minor, and also in Amurland. Two broods in Central Europe, April—May and July—August, from the Baltic provinces of Russia northward only one brood, May—June. — The form from Lapland, lapponica Teich, is uniformly dark grey-brown, the light median band of the hindwing absent. — A like-wise dark form is known from the Black Sea and Southern Siberia, being presumably more widely distributed in Central Asia; this is pontica Stgr. [now subspecies P. palpina pontica Staudinger, 1901], in which the light band of the hindwing is scarcely indicated. —Egg strongly globose, whitish green with darker spot at the pole. Larva light bluish green, with 6 rows of raised white dots, 4 being dorsal and 2 lateral. Above the spiracles a white longitudinal stripe which is anteriorly thinly edged with fuscous, at the prothoracical stigma a red streak. May to October on Poplar, Oak, Lime and Salix. Pupa dark red-brown. The moth is very common and usually settles on the bark of Poplars or Willows on such spots where the light wood appears through the damaged bark, the moth having the same colour as such light spots. The pencilling of the wings, which are held in steep roof-shape, render the specimen exactly similar to a splinter of wood, of which the palpi represent the split end, the resemblance being especially striking in a pair in copula.

== Biology ==
The moth survives winter as a pupa. The imago looks like a piece of wood and the flying period ranges from the start of April to the start of September.

1. The flight season refers to the British Isles. This may vary in other parts of the range.

== Host plants ==
The host plants are willows and poplar.
