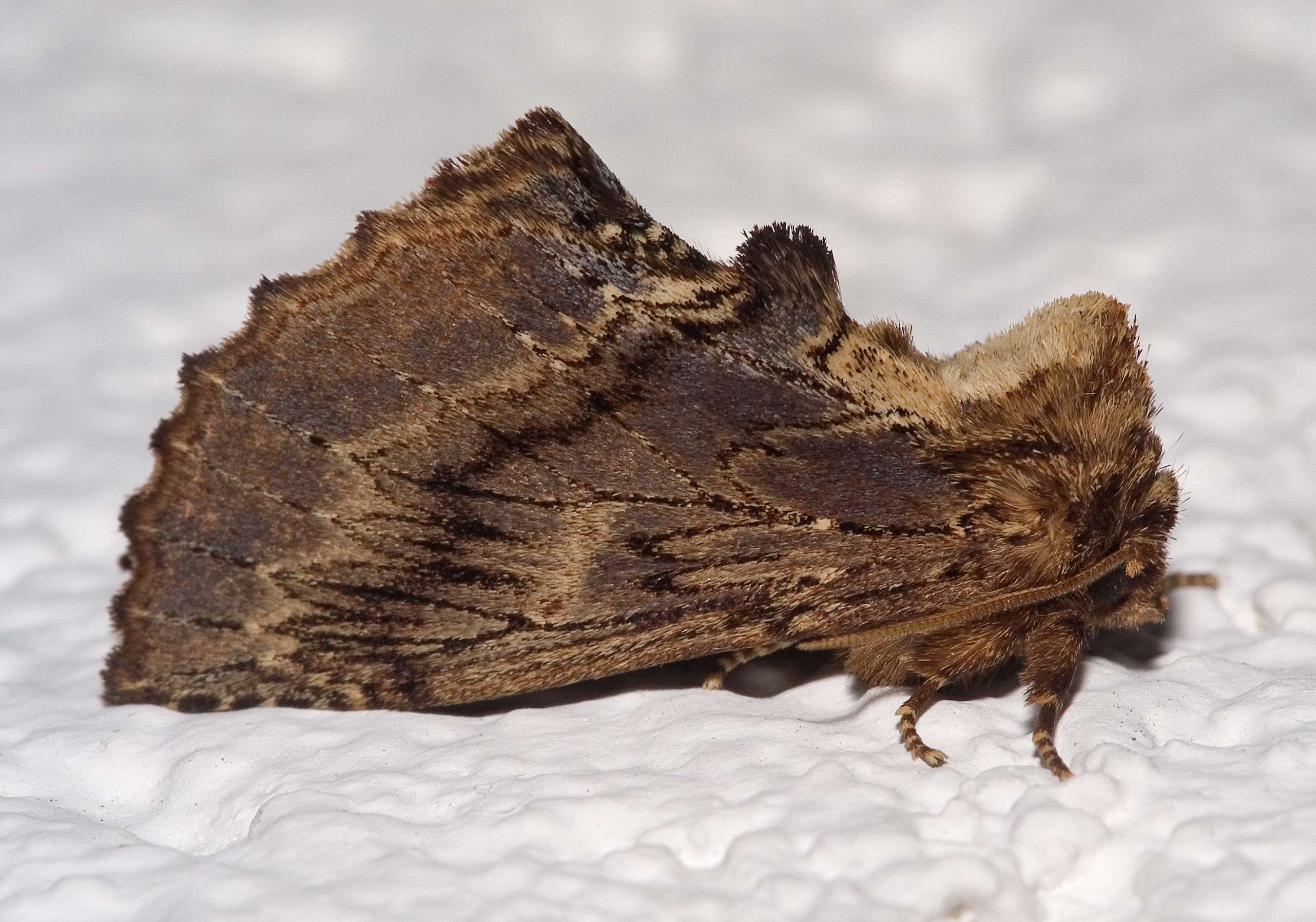
- Ptilodon capucina

Scientific classification
- Kingdom: Animalia
- Phylum: Arthropoda
- Clade: Pancrustacea
- Class: Insecta
- Order: Lepidoptera
- Superfamily: Noctuoidea
- Family: Notodontidae
- Genus: Ptilodon; Hübner, 1822

= Ptilodon =

Genus of moths

Ptilodon is a genus of moths belonging to the family Notodontidae.

The species of this genus are found in Eurasia.

Selected species:

- Ptilodon atrofusa Hampson, 1892
- Ptilodon capucina (Linnaeus, 1758)
- Ptilodon cucullina (Denis & Schiffermüller, 1775)
