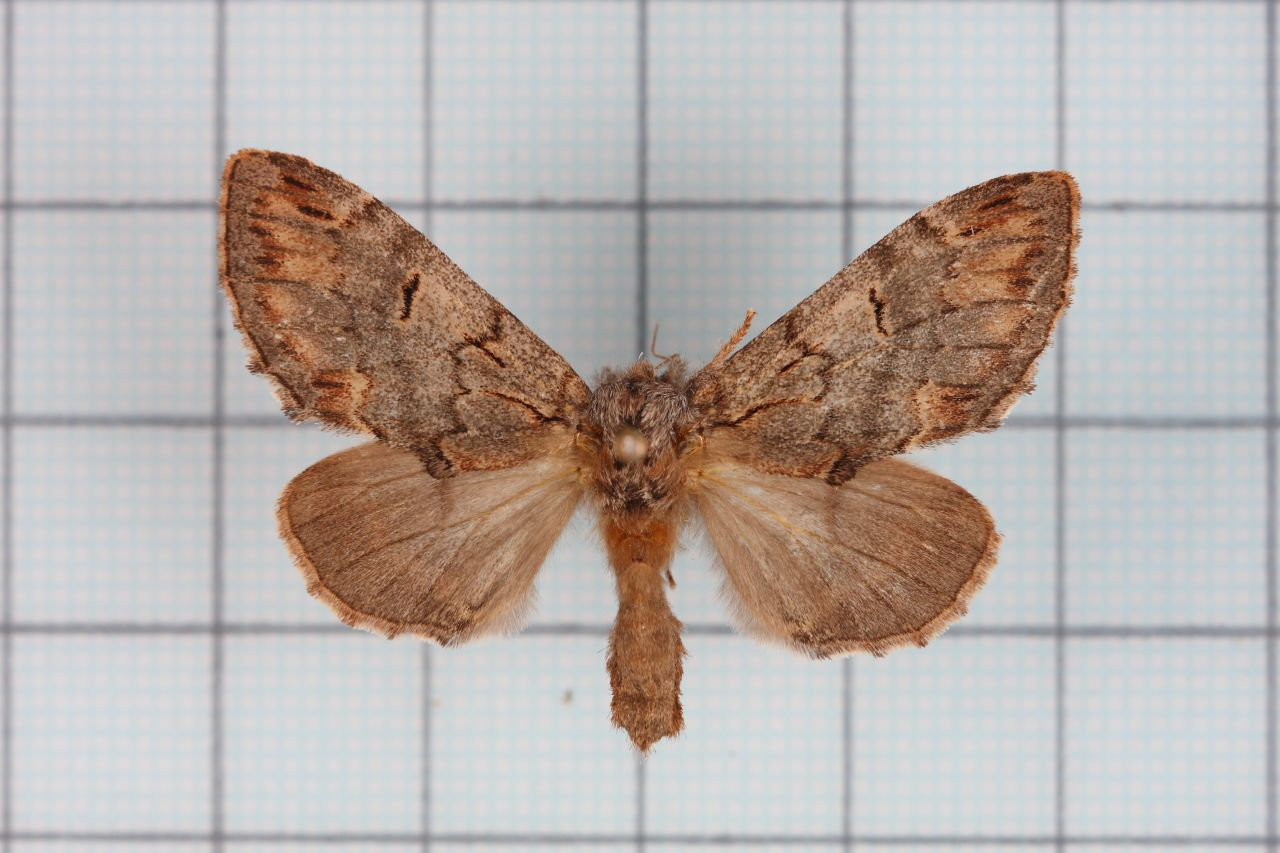
- Hyperaeschrella kosemponica

Scientific classification
- Kingdom: Animalia
- Phylum: Arthropoda
- Clade: Pancrustacea
- Class: Insecta
- Order: Lepidoptera
- Superfamily: Noctuoidea
- Family: Notodontidae
- Subfamily: Notodontinae
- Genus: Hyperaeschrella; Strand, 1916

Synonyms
- Kumataia Kiriakoff, 1967

= Hyperaeschrella =

Genus of moths

Hyperaeschrella is a genus of moths of the family Notodontidae. The genus was erected by Embrik Strand in 1916.

== Selected species ==
- Hyperaeschrella dentata Hampson, 1892
- Hyperaeschrella insulicola Kiriakoff, 1967
- Hyperaeschrella nigribasis (Hampson, [1893])
- Hyperaeschrella producta (Kiriakoff, 1967)
