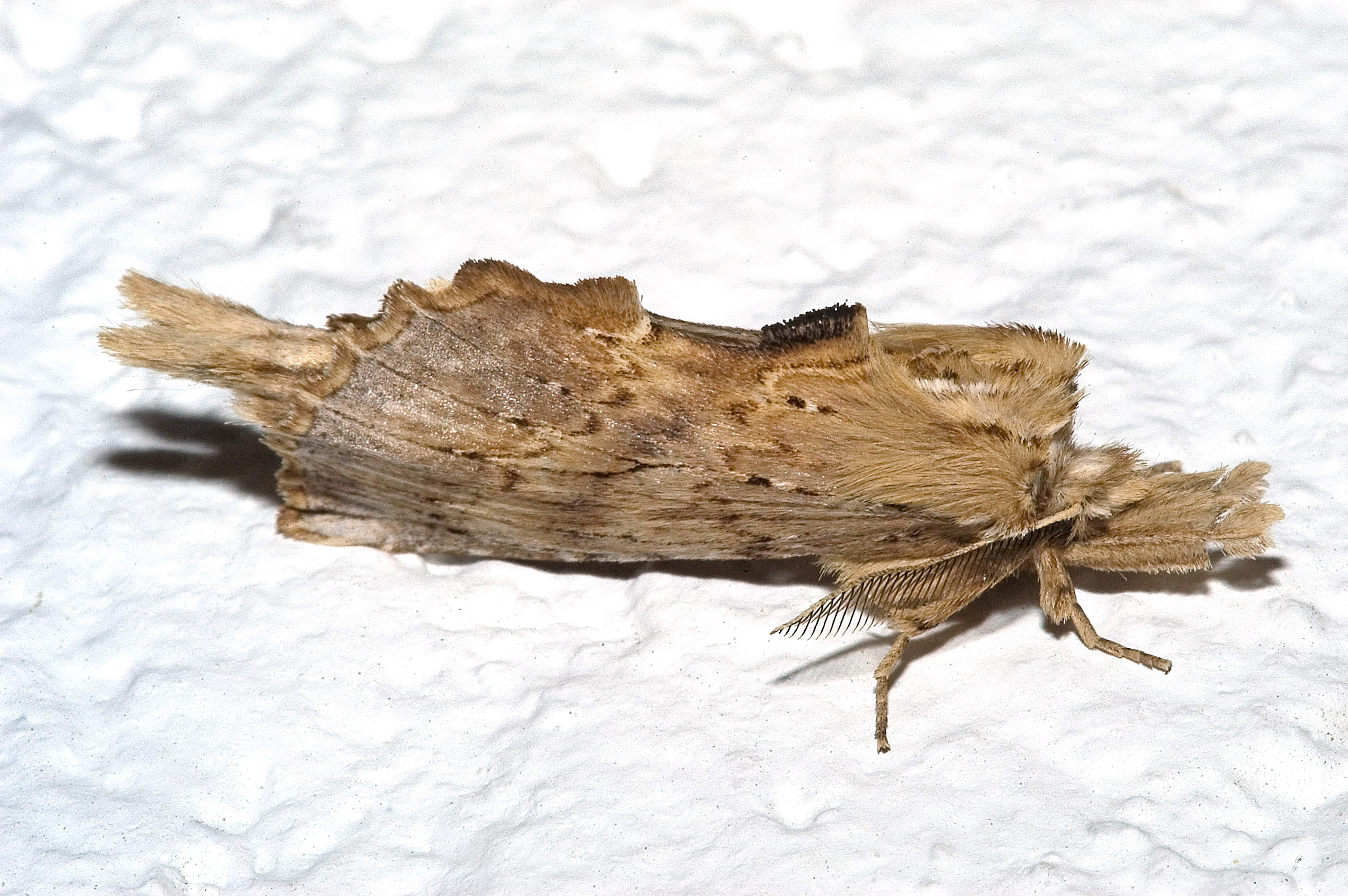
- Pterostoma palpina

Scientific classification
- Domain: Eukaryota
- Kingdom: Animalia
- Phylum: Arthropoda
- Class: Insecta
- Order: Lepidoptera
- Superfamily: Noctuoidea
- Family: Notodontidae
- Genus: Pterostoma; Germar, 1812

= Pterostoma =

Genus of moths

Pterostoma is a genus of moths belonging to the family Notodontidae.

The species of this genus are found in Eurasia.

Species:

- Pterostoma grisea Bremer, 1861
- Pterostoma hoenei Kiriakoff, 1963
- Pterostoma gigantinum Staudinger, 1892 - China, Korea, Japan, East Russia
- Pterostoma palpina (Clerck, 1759) - Europe and Central Asia
- Pterostoma sinica Moore, 1877
