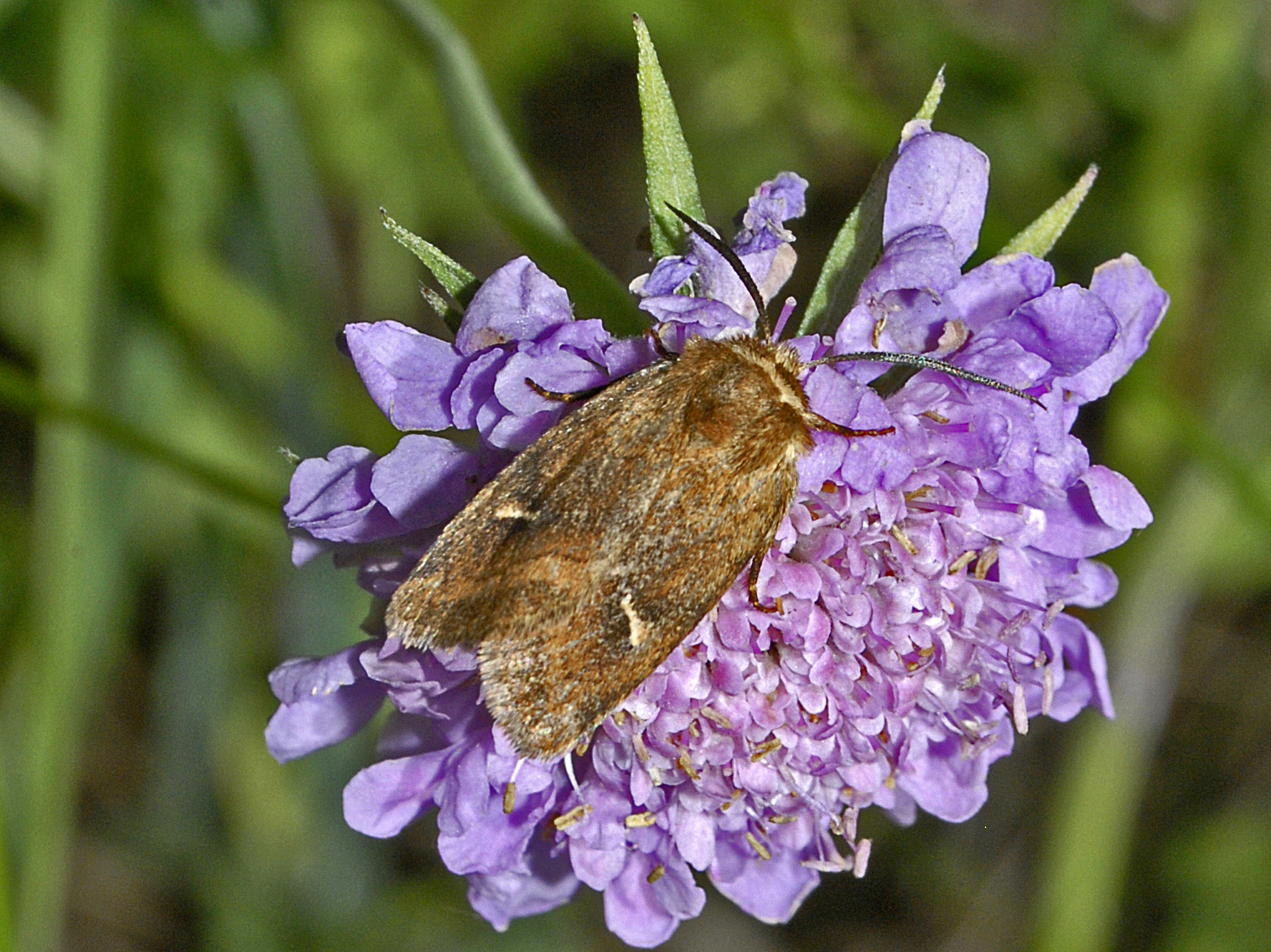
- Eriopygodes imbecilla

Scientific classification
- Kingdom: Animalia
- Phylum: Arthropoda
- Class: Insecta
- Order: Lepidoptera
- Superfamily: Noctuoidea
- Family: Noctuidae
- Genus: Eriopygodes; Hampson, 1905

= Eriopygodes =

Genus of moths

Eriopygodes is a genus of moths of the family Noctuidae. It was considered a synonym of Lasionycta for some time.

== Species ==
- Eriopygodes discalis Brandt, 1938
- Eriopygodes grammadora Dyar, 1910
- Eriopygodes imbecilla (Fabricius, 1794)
