= Lasionycta dolosa =

Scientific classification
- Kingdom: Animalia
- Phylum: Arthropoda
- Clade: Pancrustacea
- Class: Insecta
- Order: Lepidoptera
- Superfamily: Noctuoidea
- Family: Noctuidae
- Genus: Lasionycta
- Species: L. dolosa

Binomial name
- Lasionycta dolosa (Barnes & Benjamin, 1923)

Synonyms
- Anarta dolosa Barnes & Benjamin, 1923; Lasiestra dolosa McDunnough, 1938; Lasionycta staudingeri dolosa Lafontaine et al., 1986

Species of moth

Lasionycta dolosa is a moth of the family Noctuidae first described by William Barnes and Foster Hendrickson Benjamin in 1923. It is found in the Rocky Mountains of Colorado.

It is diurnal and occurs above the timberline.

Adults are on wing from early July to mid-August.
