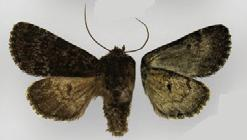

Scientific classification
- Kingdom: Animalia
- Phylum: Arthropoda
- Clade: Pancrustacea
- Class: Insecta
- Order: Lepidoptera
- Superfamily: Noctuoidea
- Family: Noctuidae
- Genus: Lasionycta
- Species: L. anthracina

Binomial name
- Lasionycta anthracina Crabo & Lafontaine, 2009

= Lasionycta anthracina =

Species of moth

Lasionycta anthracina is a moth of the family Noctuidae. It is found from the east coast of Labrador to north-eastern Alberta, southward to northern New Hampshire and Lake Superior in western Ontario.

It is found in boreal forests and bogs.

The wingspan is 22–27 mm for males and 25–29 mm for females. Adults are on wing from mid-June to mid-August.
