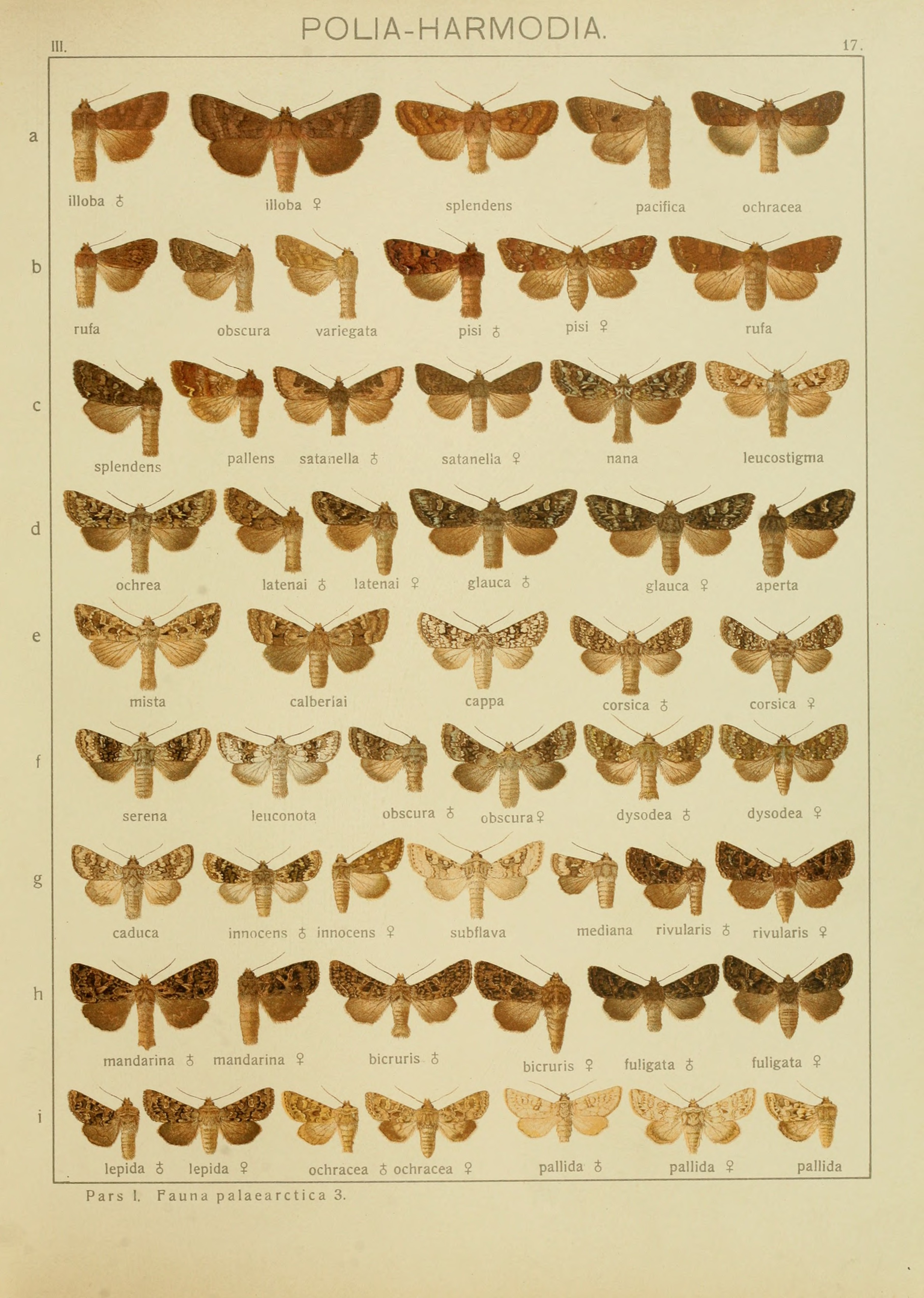
- 17e

Scientific classification
- Kingdom: Animalia
- Phylum: Arthropoda
- Clade: Pancrustacea
- Class: Insecta
- Order: Lepidoptera
- Superfamily: Noctuoidea
- Family: Noctuidae
- Genus: Lasionycta
- Species: L. calberlai

Binomial name
- Lasionycta calberlai (Staudinger, 1883)

Synonyms
- Clemathada calberlai (Staudinger, 1883); Hadena calberlai Staudinger, 1883; Mamestra calberlae var. teriolensis Dannehl, 1925; Mamestra calberlai var. decrepita Dannehl, 1929; Hada calberlai

= Lasionycta calberlai =

Species of moth

Lasionycta calberlai is a moth of the family Noctuidae. It is found in France, Switzerland, Italy and Slovenia.

== Description ==
The wingspan is 21–25 mm. Warren (1914) states calberlai Stgr. (17 e). Forewing dull greyish fuscous, with a faint brown tinge; median area darker; a short black streak from the base below cell; claviform stigma black-edged, continued as a black streak to outer line; upper stigmata of the ground colour, with paler rims; the cell brown black; submarginalline pale grey, not dentate; hindwing greyish fuscous. A small and obscure species confined to the Tyrol and the Campagna, Italy. Larva grey brown, darker on dorsum and between the segments; dorsalline pale, interrupted, with dark margins; lateral line white; spiracles black with white rings; feeds on Clematis vitalba.

== Biology ==
The larvae feed on Clematis vitalba.
