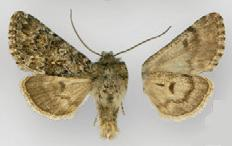

Scientific classification
- Kingdom: Animalia
- Phylum: Arthropoda
- Clade: Pancrustacea
- Class: Insecta
- Order: Lepidoptera
- Superfamily: Noctuoidea
- Family: Noctuidae
- Genus: Lasionycta
- Species: L. coloradensis

Binomial name
- Lasionycta coloradensis (Richards, 1943)

Synonyms
- Lasiestra coloradensis Richards, 1943; Lasionycta leucocycla coloradensis Lafontaine et al, 1986

= Lasionycta coloradensis =

Species of moth

Lasionycta coloradensis is a moth of the family Noctuidae. It is found in the Rocky Mountains from the Montana-Wyoming border to New Mexico.
