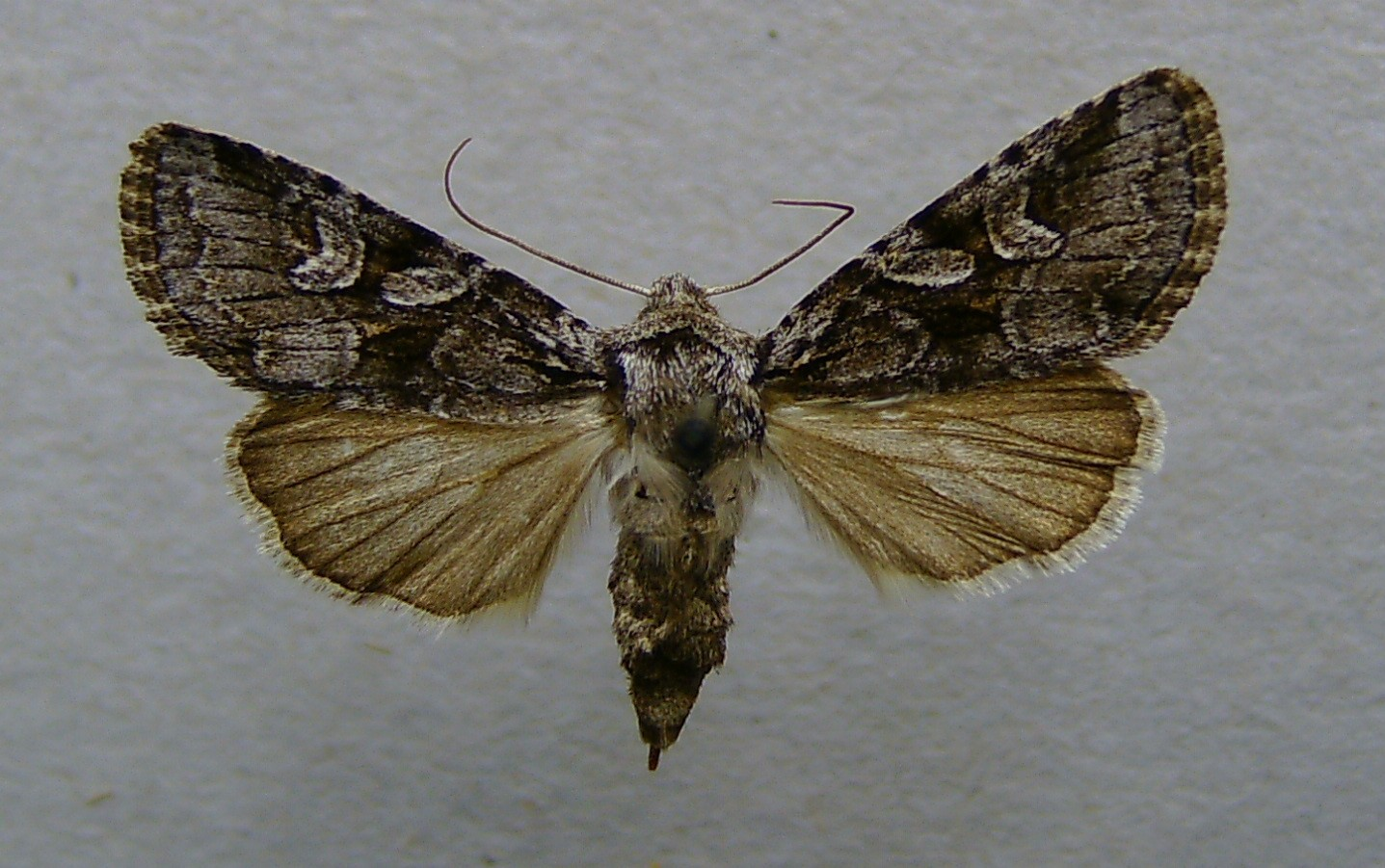

Scientific classification
- Kingdom: Animalia
- Phylum: Arthropoda
- Clade: Pancrustacea
- Class: Insecta
- Order: Lepidoptera
- Superfamily: Noctuoidea
- Family: Noctuidae
- Genus: Lasionycta
- Species: L. proxima

Binomial name
- Lasionycta proxima (Hübner, 1809)

Synonyms
- Noctua proxima Hübner, 1809; Hadena cana Eversmann, 1841; Hadena ochrostigma Eversmann, 1842; Miselia cana var. extensa Eversmann, 1844; Dianthoecia proxima var. nevadensis Reisser, 1926; Hoplodrina noguera Laever, 1976; Hada proxima; Lasionhada proxima

= Lasionycta proxima =

Species of moth

Lasionycta proxima is a moth of the family Noctuidae. It can be found from Spain through Europe, east up to eastern Asia (the Amur area). It is not present in the north-west of the British Isles. In the north, it is found up to Polar Circle. In the south it is found from the Mediterranean Sea up to the Caucasus to Mongolia.

The wingspan is 28–36 mm. The moths fly from June to August. In some locations, there is a second generation in October.

The larvae primarily feed on Alchemilla vulgaris, Taraxacum and Artemisia. But they are also recorded on Rumex crispus and Campanula.
