= Lasionycta decreta =

Scientific classification
- Kingdom: Animalia
- Phylum: Arthropoda
- Clade: Pancrustacea
- Class: Insecta
- Order: Lepidoptera
- Superfamily: Noctuoidea
- Family: Noctuidae
- Genus: Lasionycta
- Species: L. decreta

Binomial name
- Lasionycta decreta (Püngeler, 1900)

Synonyms
- Lasianobia decreta (Püngeler 1900); Mamestra decreta Püngeler 1900

Species of moth

Lasionycta decreta is a moth of the family Noctuidae. It is found in China.
