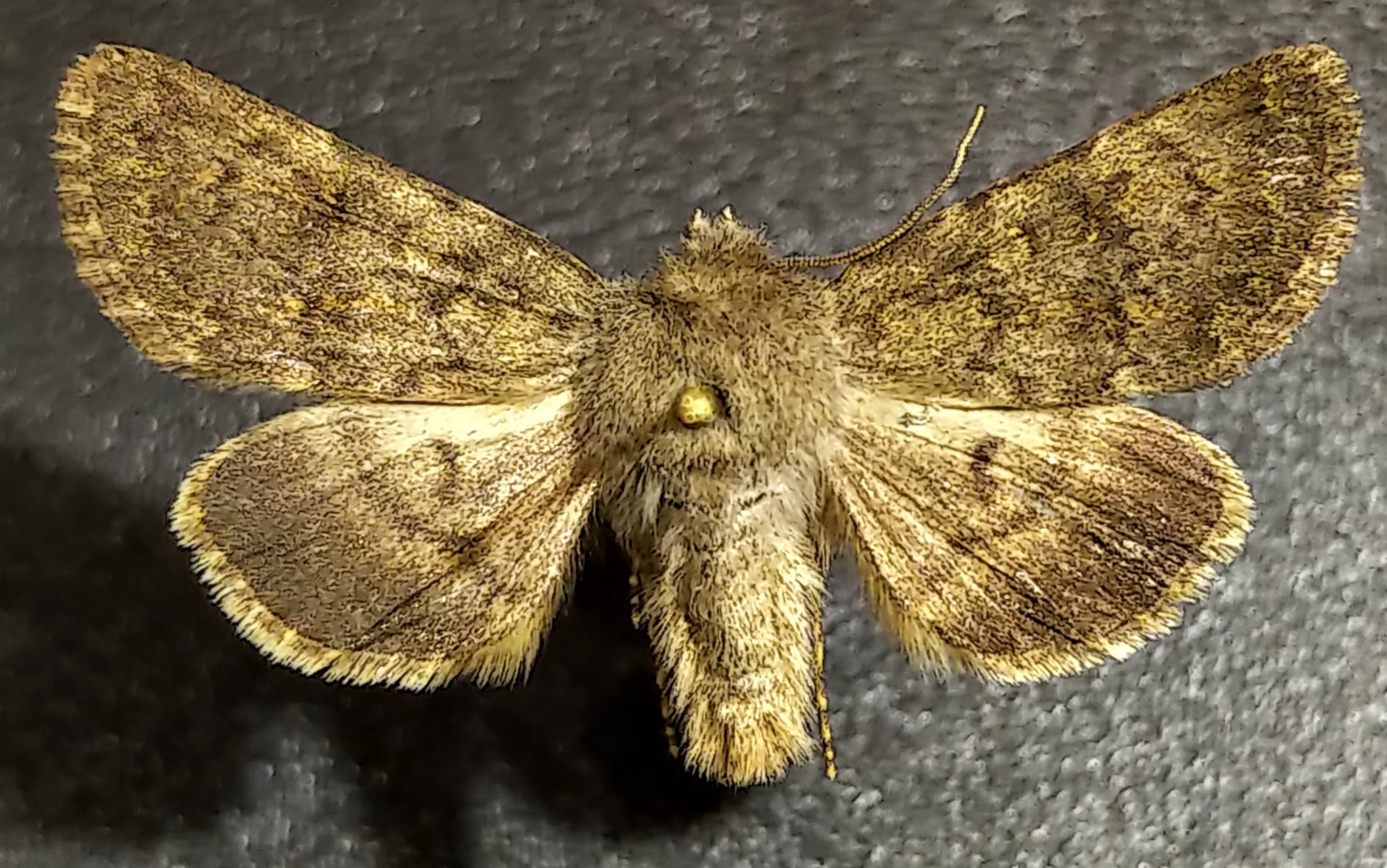

Scientific classification
- Kingdom: Animalia
- Phylum: Arthropoda
- Clade: Pancrustacea
- Class: Insecta
- Order: Lepidoptera
- Superfamily: Noctuoidea
- Family: Noctuidae
- Genus: Lasionycta
- Species: L. brunnea

Binomial name
- Lasionycta brunnea Crabo & Lafontaine, 2009

= Lasionycta brunnea =

Species of moth

Lasionycta brunnea is a species of moth in the family Noctuidae. It occurs in the Rocky Mountains of Alberta north to Pink Mountain in north-eastern British Columbia, and in the Purcell and Selkirk Mountains in south-western British Columbia and north-eastern Washington.

It flies in alpine tundra and is most common near timberline.

The wingspan is 30–35 mm for males and 34–36 mm for females. Adults are on wing from mid-July through August.
