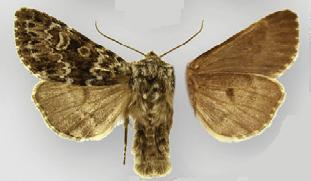

Scientific classification
- Kingdom: Animalia
- Phylum: Arthropoda
- Clade: Pancrustacea
- Class: Insecta
- Order: Lepidoptera
- Superfamily: Noctuoidea
- Family: Noctuidae
- Genus: Lasionycta
- Species: L. haida

Binomial name
- Lasionycta haida Crabo & Lafontaine, 2009

= Lasionycta haida =

Species of moth

Lasionycta haida is a moth of the family Noctuidae. It is endemic to Haida Gwaii in British Columbia.

The wingspan is 32–33 mm.
