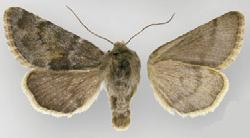

Scientific classification
- Kingdom: Animalia
- Phylum: Arthropoda
- Clade: Pancrustacea
- Class: Insecta
- Order: Lepidoptera
- Superfamily: Noctuoidea
- Family: Noctuidae
- Genus: Lasionycta
- Species: L. luteola

Binomial name
- Lasionycta luteola (Smith, 1893)

Synonyms
- Scotogramma luteola Smith, 1893b; Lasiestra luteola McDunnough 1938

= Lasionycta luteola =

Species of moth

Lasionycta luteola is a moth of the family Noctuidae. It is found from northern Washington and south-western Alberta northward to south-western Yukon.

It is found in the alpine tundra. Adults are predominantly nocturnal but also fly during the day and feed on nectar of Silene acaulis.

The wingspan is about 27 mm. Adults are on wing from mid-July to mid-August.
