= Lasionycta levicula =

Scientific classification
- Kingdom: Animalia
- Phylum: Arthropoda
- Clade: Pancrustacea
- Class: Insecta
- Order: Lepidoptera
- Superfamily: Noctuoidea
- Family: Noctuidae
- Genus: Lasionycta
- Species: L. levicula

Binomial name
- Lasionycta levicula (Püngeler, 1909)

Synonyms
- Mamestra levicula Püngeler, 1909

Species of moth

Lasionycta levicula is an Asian moth of the family Noctuidae.
