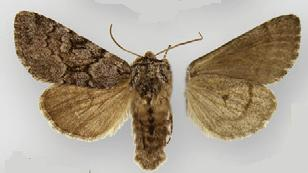

Scientific classification
- Kingdom: Animalia
- Phylum: Arthropoda
- Clade: Pancrustacea
- Class: Insecta
- Order: Lepidoptera
- Superfamily: Noctuoidea
- Family: Noctuidae
- Genus: Lasionycta
- Species: L. fergusoni

Binomial name
- Lasionycta fergusoni Crabo & Lafontaine, 2009

= Lasionycta fergusoni =

Species of moth

Lasionycta fergusoni is a species of moth in the family Noctuidae. It is found from the southern Washington Cascades through British Columbia and Alberta to southern Yukon.

It is found in subalpine forests and is nocturnal.

The wingspan is 32–36 mm for males and 32–37 mm for females. Adults are on wing from late June to mid-August.
