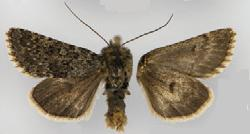
- Male
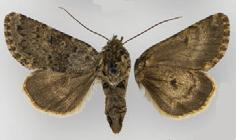
- Female

Scientific classification
- Kingdom: Animalia
- Phylum: Arthropoda
- Clade: Pancrustacea
- Class: Insecta
- Order: Lepidoptera
- Superfamily: Noctuoidea
- Family: Noctuidae
- Genus: Lasionycta
- Species: L. coracina

Binomial name
- Lasionycta coracina Crabo & Lafontaine, 2009

= Lasionycta coracina =

Species of moth

Lasionycta coracina is a moth of the family Noctuidae. It is found in the Richardson and British Mountains in northern Yukon, adjacent Northwest Territories, and Cape Thompson in north-western Alaska.

The habitat in the Richardson Mountains is sparsely vegetated gravel tundra slopes with Dryas stripes. The moths are diurnal, most active in the late afternoon and when cloudy.

The wingspan is 23–30 mm for males and 24–31 mm for females. Adults are on wing from late June to early August.

The adults feed on Saxifraga species.
