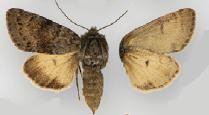
- Lasionycta impingens impingens female

Scientific classification
- Kingdom: Animalia
- Phylum: Arthropoda
- Clade: Pancrustacea
- Class: Insecta
- Order: Lepidoptera
- Superfamily: Noctuoidea
- Family: Noctuidae
- Genus: Lasionycta
- Species: L. impingens

Binomial name
- Lasionycta impingens (Walker, 1857)

Synonyms
- Anarta impingens Walker, 1857; Lasiestra impingens McDunnough, 1938; Lasionycta impingens Lafontaine et al., 1986; Mamestra curta Morrison, 1875a; Anarta curta Dyar, 1903; Lasiestra impingens curta McDunnough, 1938; Orthosia perpura Morrison, 1875b; Anarta perpura Dyar, 1903; Lasiestra perpura McDunnough, 1938; Anarta nivaria Grote, 1876; Lasiestra nivaria McDunnough, 1938

= Lasionycta impingens =

- Lasionycta impingens impingens male

Species of moth

Lasionycta impingens is a moth of the family Noctuidae. It occurs from southern Yukon to Colorado.

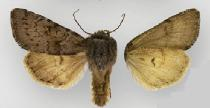
Lasionycta impingens curta

It is diurnal. Adults are common in alpine tundra. It feeds on nectar of a Penstemon species on the Beartooth Plateau, Montana, as well as on Mertensia paniculata and a Senecio, likely Senecio lugens at Pink Mountain, British Columbia.

Adults are on wing in July and August.

== Subspecies ==
- Lasionycta impingens impingens (from southern Yukon southward in the Rocky Mountains to southern British Columbia and Alberta, and in southwestern British Columbia at Pavilion north of Lillooet)
- Lasionycta impingens curta (in the Rocky Mountains from southern Montana to Colorado)
