= Lasionycta impar =

Scientific classification
- Kingdom: Animalia
- Phylum: Arthropoda
- Clade: Pancrustacea
- Class: Insecta
- Order: Lepidoptera
- Superfamily: Noctuoidea
- Family: Noctuidae
- Genus: Lasionycta
- Species: L. impar

Binomial name
- Lasionycta impar (Staudinger, 1870)

Synonyms
- Mythimna impar Staudinger, 1870; Eriopygodes impar

Species of moth

Lasionycta impar is a moth of the family Noctuidae. It is found in southern Russia.
