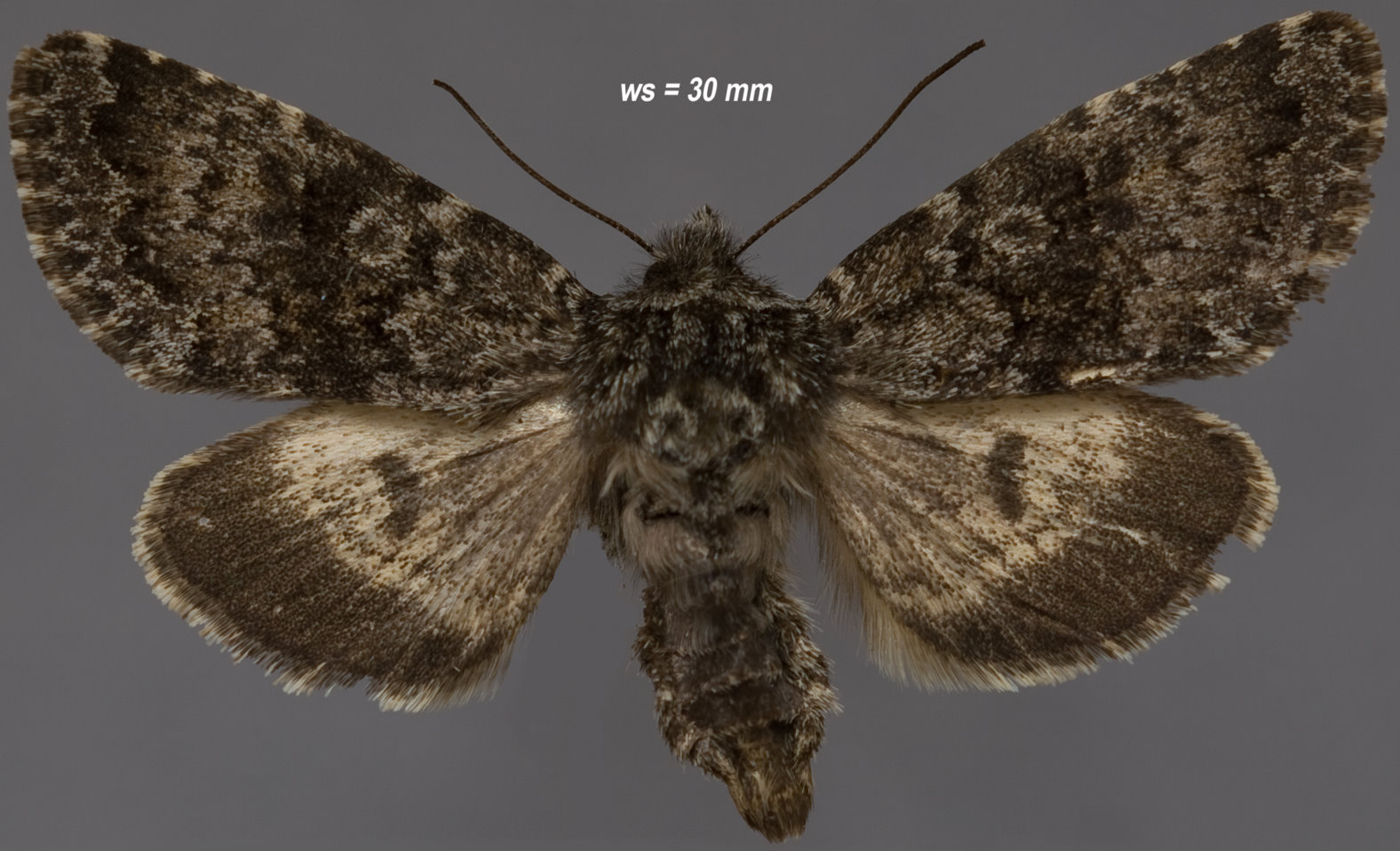

Scientific classification
- Kingdom: Animalia
- Phylum: Arthropoda
- Clade: Pancrustacea
- Class: Insecta
- Order: Lepidoptera
- Superfamily: Noctuoidea
- Family: Noctuidae
- Genus: Lasionycta
- Species: L. poca

Binomial name
- Lasionycta poca (Barnes & Benjamin, 1923)

Synonyms
- Anarta poca Barnes & Benjamin, 1923; Lasiestra leucocycla poca McDunnough, 1938; Lasiestra poca Franclemont and Todd, 1983; Lasionycta leucocycla poca Lafontaine et al., 1986

= Lasionycta poca =

Species of moth

Lasionycta poca is a species of moth in the family Noctuidae first described by William Barnes and Foster Hendrickson Benjamin in 1923. It is found throughout the Rocky Mountains of Alberta, westward to the Coast Range in western British Columbia and southward in the Cascades to Okanogan County, Washington.

It is predominantly alpine and is most common near timberline, but occasional specimens are collected in nearby forest.

The wingspan is about 27 mm. Adults are on wing from mid-June through August.
