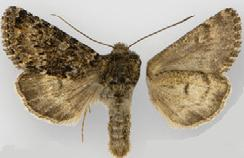
- Male
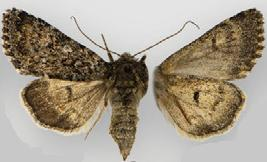
- Female

Scientific classification
- Kingdom: Animalia
- Phylum: Arthropoda
- Clade: Pancrustacea
- Class: Insecta
- Order: Lepidoptera
- Superfamily: Noctuoidea
- Family: Noctuidae
- Genus: Lasionycta
- Species: L. sasquatch

Binomial name
- Lasionycta sasquatch Crabo & Lafontaine, 2009

= Lasionycta sasquatch =

Species of moth

Lasionycta sasquatch is a moth of the family Noctuidae. It is found in the Washington Cascades south of Snoqualmie Pass, Saddle Mountain in the Oregon Coast Range, and the Siskiyou Mountains in south-western Oregon.

The habitat is subalpine parkland at two locations in the Washington Cascades. The largest series examined was collected in old growth mid-elevation forest with Tsuga heterophylla, Pseudotsuga menziesii, Abies species and Thuja plicata

The wingspan is 30–36 mm for males and 30–33 mm for females. Adults are on wing in early and mid-July.
