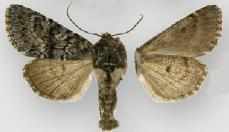
- Male
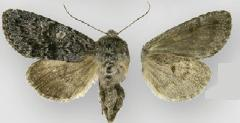
- Female

Scientific classification
- Kingdom: Animalia
- Phylum: Arthropoda
- Clade: Pancrustacea
- Class: Insecta
- Order: Lepidoptera
- Superfamily: Noctuoidea
- Family: Noctuidae
- Genus: Lasionycta
- Species: L. perplexa

Binomial name
- Lasionycta perplexa (Smith, 1888)

Synonyms
- Scotogramma perplexa Smith, 1888; Lasionycta perplexa McDunnough, 1938; Anytus marloffi Dyar, 1922; Lasionycta marloffi McDunnough, 1938; Lasionycta alberta Barnes & Benjamin, 1923

= Lasionycta perplexa =

Species of moth

Lasionycta perplexa is a moth of the family Noctuidae. It is widely distributed from southern Alaska and Yukon in the north to California, Utah, and Colorado in the South. A disjunct population is found on the east coast of Hudson Bay at Kuujjuaraapik.

The habitat is conifer forest.

The wingspan is 33–35 mm. Adults are on wing from mid-June through August.

The larvae feed on Alnus species.
