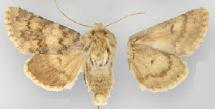

Scientific classification
- Kingdom: Animalia
- Phylum: Arthropoda
- Clade: Pancrustacea
- Class: Insecta
- Order: Lepidoptera
- Superfamily: Noctuoidea
- Family: Noctuidae
- Genus: Lasionycta
- Species: L. sierra

Binomial name
- Lasionycta sierra Crabo & Lafontaine, 2009

= Lasionycta sierra =

Species of moth

Lasionycta sierra is a moth of the family Noctuidae. It occurs in the Sierra Nevada of California.

It is found in subalpine forests and alpine tundra and is nocturnal.

The wingspan is 32–34 mm for males and 35–36 mm for females. Adults are on wing from late July through August.
