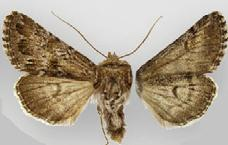
- Lasionycta benjamini benjamini
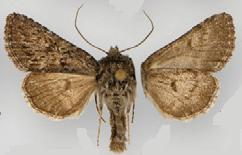
- Lasionycta benjamini medaminosa

Scientific classification
- Kingdom: Animalia
- Phylum: Arthropoda
- Clade: Pancrustacea
- Class: Insecta
- Order: Lepidoptera
- Superfamily: Noctuoidea
- Family: Noctuidae
- Genus: Lasionycta
- Species: L. benjamini

Binomial name
- Lasionycta benjamini (Hill, 1927)

Synonyms
- Lascionycta benjamini Hill, 1927

= Lasionycta benjamini =

Species of moth

Lasionycta benjamini is a moth of the family Noctuidae. It is found in the Sierra Nevada of California and in the mountains of Nevada and Colorado.

The habitat is montane conifer forest.

Adults are on wing from late June to mid-August.

== Subspecies ==
- Lasionycta benjamini benjamini (California and Nevada)
- Lasionycta benjamini medaminosa (Colorado)
