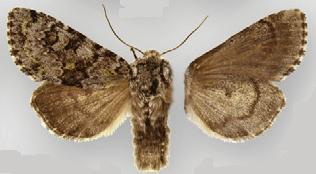

Scientific classification
- Kingdom: Animalia
- Phylum: Arthropoda
- Clade: Pancrustacea
- Class: Insecta
- Order: Lepidoptera
- Superfamily: Noctuoidea
- Family: Noctuidae
- Genus: Lasionycta
- Species: L. mutilata

Binomial name
- Lasionycta mutilata (Smith, 1898)

Synonyms
- Mamestra mutilata Smith, 1898; Lasionycta mutilata McDunnough, 1938; Mamestra rainieri Smith, 1900; Mamestra rainierii Dyar, 1903; Lasionycta rainieri McDunnough, 1938; Lasionycta rainierii

= Lasionycta mutilata =

Species of moth

Lasionycta mutilata is a moth of the family Noctuidae. It is found from Oregon and Yellowstone National Park, Montana and Wyoming, northward to the Alaskan Panhandle and the Rocky Mountains of Alberta. It is absent from the Queen Charlotte Islands.

It is found in the high transition zone and subalpine conifer forests and is nocturnal.

Adults are on wing from late June through August.
