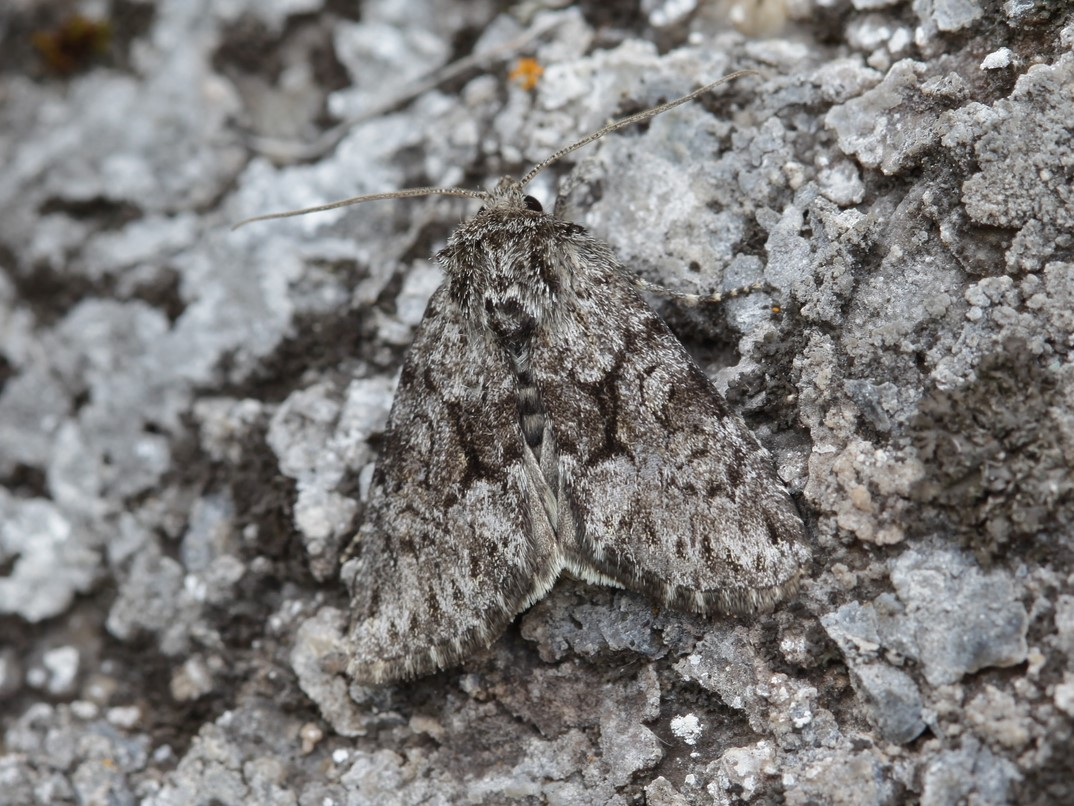

Scientific classification
- Kingdom: Animalia
- Phylum: Arthropoda
- Clade: Pancrustacea
- Class: Insecta
- Order: Lepidoptera
- Superfamily: Noctuoidea
- Family: Noctuidae
- Genus: Lasionycta
- Species: L. hospita

Binomial name
- Lasionycta hospita Bang-Haas, 1912

Synonyms
- Lasionycta ardua Filipjev, 1925

= Lasionycta hospita =

Species of moth

Lasionycta hospita is a species of moth in the family Noctuidae. It is found in the South Siberian Mountains and the Amur and Primorye regions
