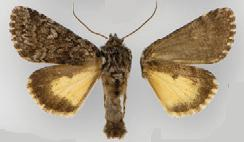
- Lasionycta secedens secedens
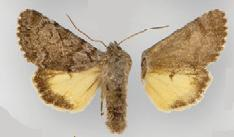
- Lasionycta secedens bohemani

Scientific classification
- Kingdom: Animalia
- Phylum: Arthropoda
- Clade: Pancrustacea
- Class: Insecta
- Order: Lepidoptera
- Superfamily: Noctuoidea
- Family: Noctuidae
- Genus: Lasionycta
- Species: L. secedens

Binomial name
- Lasionycta secedens (Walker, [1858])

Synonyms
- Plusia secedens Walker, [1858]; Anarta secedens Smith 1893a; Polia secedens McDunnough 1938; Anartomima secedens Franclemont and Todd 1982; Anarta bohemani Staudinger, 1861; Anartomima bohemani Boursin 1952; Anartomima secedens bohemani Kononenko et al. 1989; Lasionycta secedens syn. bohemani Hacker et al. 2002

= Lasionycta secedens =

Species of moth

Lasionycta secedens is a species of moth in the family Noctuidae. It has a Holarctic distribution. North American populations are distributed from Labrador, northern Manitoba, and Alaska, southward to northern Maine, northern Minnesota, and south-central British Columbia. Subspecies bohemani occurs in northern Eurasia, Alaska and Yukon.

== Subspecies ==
- Lasionycta secedens secedens (from eastern Canada to northern British Columbia)
- Lasionycta secedens bohemani (northern Eurasia, Alaska and Yukon)
