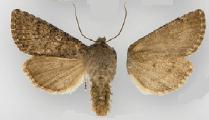
- Male
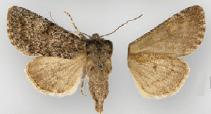
- Female

Scientific classification
- Kingdom: Animalia
- Phylum: Arthropoda
- Clade: Pancrustacea
- Class: Insecta
- Order: Lepidoptera
- Superfamily: Noctuoidea
- Family: Noctuidae
- Genus: Lasionycta
- Species: L. subalpina

Binomial name
- Lasionycta subalpina Crabo & Lafontaine, 2009

= Lasionycta subalpina =

Species of moth

Lasionycta subalpina is a moth of the family Noctuidae. It is found from southern Idaho and the Beartooth Plateau on the Montana-Wyoming border to Colorado and central Utah as well as in the Sierra Nevada of California.

The habitat is subalpine forests and mid-elevation pine forests.

The wingspan is 29–33 mm for males and 30–35 mm for females. Adults are on wing from mid-July through August.
