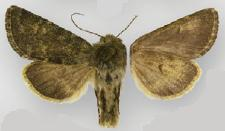
- Male
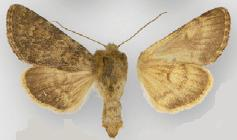
- Female

Scientific classification
- Kingdom: Animalia
- Phylum: Arthropoda
- Clade: Pancrustacea
- Class: Insecta
- Order: Lepidoptera
- Superfamily: Noctuoidea
- Family: Noctuidae
- Genus: Lasionycta
- Species: L. silacea

Binomial name
- Lasionycta silacea Crabo & Lafontaine, 2009

= Lasionycta silacea =

Species of moth

Lasionycta silacea is a moth of the family Noctuidae. It occurs from the British Columbia Coast Range and the Washington Cascades to extreme south-western Alberta.

It is found near the treeline and is nocturnal.

The wingspan is 32–37 mm for males and 36–38 mm for females. Adults are on wing from early July through August.
