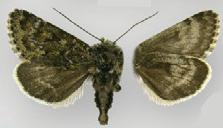
- Lasionycta staudingeri preblei female
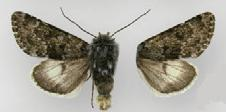
- Lasionycta staudingeri preblei male

Scientific classification
- Kingdom: Animalia
- Phylum: Arthropoda
- Clade: Pancrustacea
- Class: Insecta
- Order: Lepidoptera
- Superfamily: Noctuoidea
- Family: Noctuidae
- Genus: Lasionycta
- Species: L. staudingeri

Binomial name
- Lasionycta staudingeri (Aurivillius, 1891)

Synonyms
- Anarta staudingeri Aurivillius, 1891; Lasionycta sajanensis Kononenko, 1988; Anarta schoenherri Staudinger, 1861; Lasiestra staudingeri McDunnough, 1938; Hada staudingeri Hartig and Heinicke, 1973; Lasionycta staudingeri Lafontaine et al., 1986; Anarta zemblica Hampson, 1905; Anarta preblei Benjamin, 1933; Lasiestra leucocycla preblei McDunnough, 1938; Lasiestra preblei Franclemont and Todd, 1983; Lasionycta staudingeri preblei Lafontaine et al., 1986; Lasionycta staudingeri sajanensis Kononenko, 1986; Lasionycta preblei (Benjamin, 1933)

= Lasionycta staudingeri =

Species of moth

Lasionycta staudingeri is a moth of the family Noctuidae. It can be found from Oppland to Finland and Norway in Europe, as well as Siberia and North America.

The species is diurnal and flies over dry scree tundra.

The wingspan is 21–27 mm. The moths fly from June to July.

The larvae feed on Taraxacum and Empetrum species.

== Subspecies ==
- Lasionycta staudingeri staudingeri (Eurasia)
- Lasionycta staudingeri preblei (across northern North America from Baffi n Island to western Alaska and southward to 60° North. Its range extends into northeastern Siberia at least as far as the Kolyma River)
