= Lasionycta montanoides =

Scientific classification
- Kingdom: Animalia
- Phylum: Arthropoda
- Clade: Pancrustacea
- Class: Insecta
- Order: Lepidoptera
- Superfamily: Noctuoidea
- Family: Noctuidae
- Genus: Lasionycta
- Species: L. montanoides

Binomial name
- Lasionycta montanoides (Poole, 1989)

Synonyms
- Lasiestra montanoides Poole, 1989; Polia montana Leech, 1900 (preocc.)

Species of moth

Lasionycta montanoides is a moth of the family Noctuidae. It is found in Asia.
