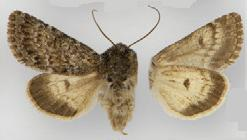

Scientific classification
- Kingdom: Animalia
- Phylum: Arthropoda
- Clade: Pancrustacea
- Class: Insecta
- Order: Lepidoptera
- Superfamily: Noctuoidea
- Family: Noctuidae
- Genus: Lasionycta
- Species: L. frigida

Binomial name
- Lasionycta frigida Crabo & Lafontaine, 2009

= Lasionycta frigida =

Species of moth

Lasionycta frigida is a moth of the family Noctuidae. It has a restricted range in the Alberta Rocky Mountains. It is possibly also present in Yukon and Alaska.

The habitat is mixed forest in cold microclimates.

The wingspan is 26 mm for males and 27 mm for females. Adults are on wing in mid-July.
