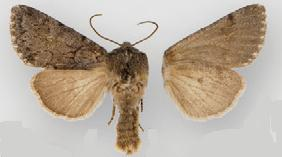
- male
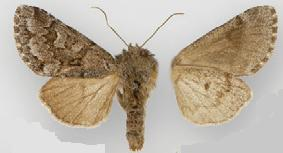
- female

Scientific classification
- Kingdom: Animalia
- Phylum: Arthropoda
- Clade: Pancrustacea
- Class: Insecta
- Order: Lepidoptera
- Superfamily: Noctuoidea
- Family: Noctuidae
- Genus: Lasionycta
- Species: L. skraelingia

Binomial name
- Lasionycta skraelingia (Herrich-Schäffer, 1852)
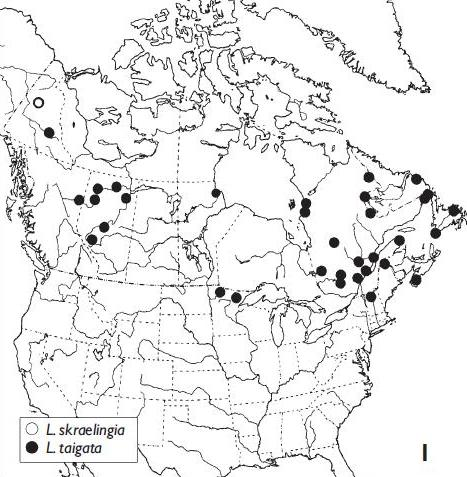
- Range

Synonyms
- Phlogophora skraelingia Herrich-Schäffer, 1852; Lasionycta skraelingia Aurivillius, 1892b; Mamestra skraelingia Staudinger and Rebel, 1901; Lasionycta scraelingia Hampson, 1905 (Invalid emendation); Lasionycta skroelingia Warren 1910 (Misspelling); Hada skraelingia Hartig and Heinicke, 1973

= Lasionycta skraelingia =

Species of moth

Lasionycta skraelingia is a moth of the family Noctuidae. It has a Holarctic distribution, occurring from Scandinavia to north-western North America. In North America this species is known from three specimens from Windy Pass, Ogilvie Mountains, Yukon.

The wingspan is about 31 mm. Adults are on wing from late June to early July. In Eurasia, the species is biennial. This is likely also the case in North America. The Yukon specimens were collected in two odd-numbered years.

In Scandinavia the species is polyphagous when reared and has been fed on Betula nana, Polygonum aviculare and Vaccinium uligonosum.
