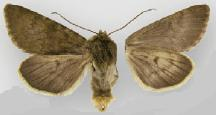
- Lasionycta uniformis uniformis

Scientific classification
- Kingdom: Animalia
- Phylum: Arthropoda
- Clade: Pancrustacea
- Class: Insecta
- Order: Lepidoptera
- Superfamily: Noctuoidea
- Family: Noctuidae
- Genus: Lasionycta
- Species: L. uniformis

Binomial name
- Lasionycta uniformis (Smith, 1893)

Synonyms
- Scotogramma uniformis Smith, 1893b; Lasiestra uniformis McDunnough, 1938; Lasionycta uniformis Lafontaine et al., 1986

= Lasionycta uniformis =

Species of moth

Lasionycta uniformis is a species of moth in the family Noctuidae. It is widely distributed in the mountains of western North America. It occurs from southern Yukon to northern California and Colorado, with an isolated population in eastern Quebec.

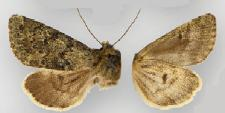
Lasionycta uniformis handfieldi

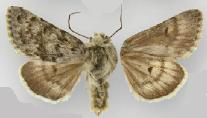
Lasionycta uniformis shasta

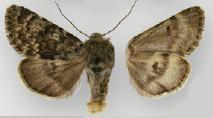
Lasionycta uniformis fusca

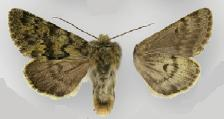
Lasionycta uniformis multicolor

Adults are on wing from early July to late August.

== Subspecies ==
- Lasionycta uniformis uniformis (Rocky Mountains and Purcell Mountains of southwestern British Columbia north to northeastern British Columbia)
- Lasionycta uniformis multicolor (from Montana Mountain in southwestern Yukon, south in the British Columbia Coast Range to the Cascades in southern Washington)
- Lasionycta uniformis fusca (from central Colorado and northern Utah to the Beartooth Plateau on the Wyoming-Montana border)
- Lasionycta uniformis shasta (on Mount Shasta in the Cascade Range of northern California. It might be more widely distributed in northern California and Oregon in the southern Cascades or Klamath Mountains)
- Lasionycta uniformis handfieldi (on Mount Albert in the Gaspé Peninsula of Quebec)
