= Lasionycta buraetica =

Scientific classification
- Kingdom: Animalia
- Phylum: Arthropoda
- Clade: Pancrustacea
- Class: Insecta
- Order: Lepidoptera
- Superfamily: Noctuoidea
- Family: Noctuidae
- Genus: Lasionycta
- Species: L. buraetica

Binomial name
- Lasionycta buraetica Kononenko, 1988

Species of moth

Lasionycta buraetica is a moth of the family Noctuidae. It is found in the Sayan Mountains in Russia.
