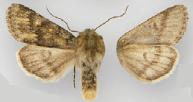

Scientific classification
- Kingdom: Animalia
- Phylum: Arthropoda
- Clade: Pancrustacea
- Class: Insecta
- Order: Lepidoptera
- Superfamily: Noctuoidea
- Family: Noctuidae
- Genus: Lasionycta
- Species: L. discolor

Binomial name
- Lasionycta discolor (Smith, 1899)

Synonyms
- Scotogramma discolor Smith, 1899; Lasiestra discolor McDunnough, 1938; Lasionycta discolor Lafontaine et al., 1986; Lasiestra klotsi Richards, 1943; Lasionycta klotsi Lafontaine et al., 1986

= Lasionycta discolor =

Species of moth

Lasionycta discolor is a moth of the family Noctuidae. It occurs in the Rocky Mountains of Colorado and on the Beartooth Plateau in Wyoming.

It flies over alpine tundra and is both diurnal and nocturnal.

Adults are on wing in late July.
