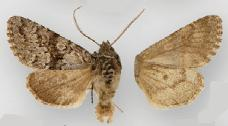
- Lasionycta subfuscula subfuscula male
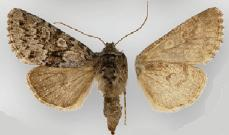
- Lasionycta subfuscula subfuscula female

Scientific classification
- Kingdom: Animalia
- Phylum: Arthropoda
- Clade: Pancrustacea
- Class: Insecta
- Order: Lepidoptera
- Superfamily: Noctuoidea
- Family: Noctuidae
- Genus: Lasionycta
- Species: L. subfuscula

Binomial name
- Lasionycta subfuscula (Grote, 1874)

Synonyms
- Anarta subfuscula Grote, 1874; Lasionycta subfuscula McDunnough, 1938; Scotogramma sedilis Smith, 1899; Lasionycta sedilis McDunnough, 1938

= Lasionycta subfuscula =

Species of moth

Lasionycta subfuscula is a moth of the family Noctuidae. It is found from south-western British Columbia and south-western Alberta south to southern Oregon in the west and to southern Colorado and Utah in the Rocky Mountains.

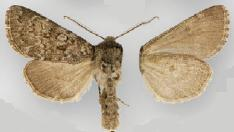
Lasionycta subfuscula livida male

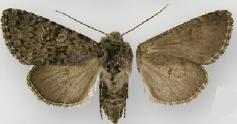
Lasionycta subfuscula livida female

It is found in the transition zone and subalpine forests.

Adults are on wing from mid-June to early September.

== Subspecies ==
- Lasionycta subfuscula subfuscula (from the Wind River Mountains of Wyoming and southeastern Idaho to southern Colorado and Utah)
- Lasionycta subfuscula livida (from southwestern British Columbia and extreme southwestern Alberta to southern Oregon)
