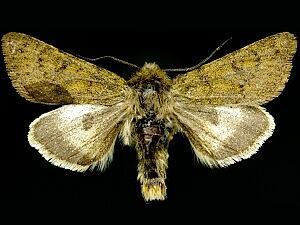

Scientific classification
- Kingdom: Animalia
- Phylum: Arthropoda
- Clade: Pancrustacea
- Class: Insecta
- Order: Lepidoptera
- Superfamily: Noctuoidea
- Family: Noctuidae
- Genus: Lasionycta
- Species: L. quadrilunata

Binomial name
- Lasionycta quadrilunata (Grote, 1874)

Synonyms
- Anarta quadrilunata Grote, 1874b; Lasiestra quadrilunata McDunnough 1938; Lasionycta quadrilunata Lafontaine et al. 1986; Lasionycta quadrilunata yukona Lafontaine, 1986

= Lasionycta quadrilunata =

Species of moth

Lasionycta quadrilunata is a species of moth in the family Noctuidae. It is found from south-central Alaska down the spine of the Rocky Mountains to Colorado.

It flies over scree tundra and is diurnal.

Adults are on wing from mid-July to early August.

== Subspecies ==
- Lasionycta quadrilunata quadrilunata (mountains of Colorado)
- Lasionycta quadrilunata yukona (Alaska Range, southwestern Yukon, the Alberta Rocky Mountains, and the Beartooth Plateau in Montana)
