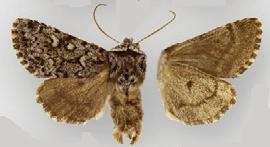

Scientific classification
- Kingdom: Animalia
- Phylum: Arthropoda
- Clade: Pancrustacea
- Class: Insecta
- Order: Lepidoptera
- Superfamily: Noctuoidea
- Family: Noctuidae
- Genus: Lasionycta
- Species: L. subdita

Binomial name
- Lasionycta subdita (Möschler, 1860)

Synonyms
- Dianthoecia subdita Möschler, 1860; Mamestra subdita Smith 1893a; Lasionycta subdita McDunnough, 1938; Anarta membrosa Morrison, 1875a; Anarta membranosa Smith, 1893a (misspelling); Lasionycta membrosa McDunnough, 1938

= Lasionycta subdita =

Species of moth

Lasionycta subdita is a moth species of the family Noctuidae, first described in 1860 by Heinrich Benno Möschler (as Dianthoecia subdita). Its MONA number is 10356.

== Distribution ==
The species occurs in north-eastern North America, where it has a mostly subarctic distribution across two disconnected ranges: one from Labrador, Quebec and Ontario to the western shore of Hudson Bay in Manitoba, and another limited to New Hampshire's White Mountains.

== Behavior ==
Adult specimens attracted to light and recorded in July.
