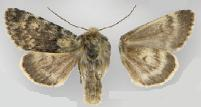
- Male
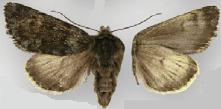
- Female

Scientific classification
- Kingdom: Animalia
- Phylum: Arthropoda
- Clade: Pancrustacea
- Class: Insecta
- Order: Lepidoptera
- Superfamily: Noctuoidea
- Family: Noctuidae
- Genus: Lasionycta
- Species: L. gelida

Binomial name
- Lasionycta gelida Crabo & Lafontaine, 2009

= Lasionycta gelida =

Species of moth

Lasionycta gelida is a moth of the family Noctuidae. It is known from three specimens from the British Columbia Coast Range.

It occurs in rocky tundra slightly above timberline.

The wingspan is 31 mm for males and 36 mm for females. Adults are on wing from late July to mid-August.
