= Lasionycta corax =

Scientific classification
- Kingdom: Animalia
- Phylum: Arthropoda
- Clade: Pancrustacea
- Class: Insecta
- Order: Lepidoptera
- Superfamily: Noctuoidea
- Family: Noctuidae
- Genus: Lasionycta
- Species: L. corax

Binomial name
- Lasionycta corax Kononenko, 1988

Species of moth

Lasionycta corax is a moth of the family Noctuidae. It is found in the Upper Kolyma River area in Russia.
