= Lasionycta orientalis =

Scientific classification
- Kingdom: Animalia
- Phylum: Arthropoda
- Clade: Pancrustacea
- Class: Insecta
- Order: Lepidoptera
- Superfamily: Noctuoidea
- Family: Noctuidae
- Genus: Lasionycta
- Species: L. orientalis

Binomial name
- Lasionycta orientalis (Alphéraky, 1882)

Synonyms
- Dianthoecia orientalis Alphéraky, 1882

Species of moth

Lasionycta orientalis is a moth of the family Noctuidae. It is found in Tajikistan and Kyrgyzstan.
