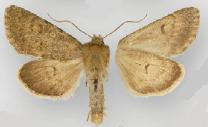

Scientific classification
- Kingdom: Animalia
- Phylum: Arthropoda
- Clade: Pancrustacea
- Class: Insecta
- Order: Lepidoptera
- Superfamily: Noctuoidea
- Family: Noctuidae
- Genus: Lasionycta
- Species: L. pulverea

Binomial name
- Lasionycta pulverea Crabo & Lafontaine, 2009

= Lasionycta pulverea =

Species of moth

Lasionycta pulverea is a moth of the family Noctuidae. It has a restricted range in the Rocky Mountain foothills of Alberta from Nordegg to Blairmore, with a single specimen from Lethbridge.

It is found in subalpine parkland and is nocturnal.

The wingspan is 29–34 mm for males and 32 mm for females. Adults are on wing in early and mid-July
