= Lasionycta draudti =

Scientific classification
- Kingdom: Animalia
- Phylum: Arthropoda
- Clade: Pancrustacea
- Class: Insecta
- Order: Lepidoptera
- Superfamily: Noctuoidea
- Family: Noctuidae
- Genus: Lasionycta
- Species: L. draudti

Binomial name
- Lasionycta draudti (Wagner, 1936)

Synonyms
- Polia draudti Wagner, 1936

Species of moth

Lasionycta draudti is a moth of the family Noctuidae. It is found in northern Iran.
