= Lasionycta macleani =

Scientific classification
- Kingdom: Animalia
- Phylum: Arthropoda
- Clade: Pancrustacea
- Class: Insecta
- Order: Lepidoptera
- Superfamily: Noctuoidea
- Family: Noctuidae
- Genus: Lasionycta
- Species: L. macleani

Binomial name
- Lasionycta macleani (McDunnough, 1927)

Synonyms
- Anarta macleani McDunnough, 1927; Lasiestra macleani McDunnough, 1938; Lasionycta macleani Lafontaine et al., 1986

Species of moth

Lasionycta macleani is a moth of the family Noctuidae. It is known only from the east or southeast slope Mount McLean.

It is found at or above timberline.
