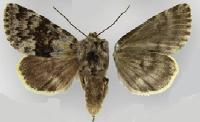
- Lasionycta caesia

Scientific classification
- Domain: Eukaryota
- Kingdom: Animalia
- Phylum: Arthropoda
- Class: Insecta
- Order: Lepidoptera
- Superfamily: Noctuoidea
- Family: Noctuidae
- Tribe: Eriopygini
- Genus: Lasionycta; Aurivillius, 1892

= Lasionycta =

Genus of moths

Lasionycta is a genus of moths of the family Noctuidae.

== Species ==
- Lasionycta alpicola Lafontaine & Kononenko, 1988
- Lasionycta anthracina Crabo & Lafontaine, 2009
- Lasionycta benjamini Hill, 1927
- Lasionycta brunnea Crabo & Lafontaine, 2009
- Lasionycta buraetica Kononenko, 1988
- Lasionycta caesia Crabo & Lafontaine, 2009
- Lasionycta calberlai (Staudinger, 1883)
- Lasionycta carolynae Crabo, 2009
- Lasionycta coloradensis (Richards, 1943)
- Lasionycta conjugata (Smith, 1899)
- Lasionycta coracina Crabo & Lafontaine, 2009
- Lasionycta corax Kononenko, 1988
- Lasionycta decreta (Püngeler, 1900)
- Lasionycta discolor (Smith, 1899)
- Lasionycta dolosa (Barnes & Benjamin, 1923)
- Lasionycta draudti (Wagner, 1936)
- Lasionycta fergusoni Crabo & Lafontaine, 2009
- Lasionycta flanda (Smith, 1908)
- Lasionycta frigida Crabo & Lafontaine, 2009
- Lasionycta gelida Crabo & Lafontaine, 2009
- Lasionycta haida Crabo & Lafontaine, 2009
- Lasionycta hampsoni Varga, 1974
- Lasionycta hospita Bang-Haas, 1912
- Lasionycta illima Crabo & Lafontaine, 2009
- Lasionycta imbecilla (Fabricius, 1794)
- Lasionycta impar (Staudinger, 1870)
- Lasionycta impingens (Walker, 1857)
- Lasionycta lagganata (Barnes & Benjamin, 1924)
- Lasionycta leucocycla (Staudinger, 1857)
- Lasionycta levicula (Püngeler, 1909)
- Lasionycta luteola (Smith, 1893)
- Lasionycta macleani (McDunnough, 1927)
- Lasionycta melanographa Varga, 1973
- Lasionycta mono Crabo & Lafontaine, 2009
- Lasionycta montanoides (Poole, 1989)
- Lasionycta mutilata (Smith, 1898)
- Lasionycta orientalis (Alphéraky, 1882)
- Lasionycta perplexa (Smith, 1888)
- Lasionycta perplexella Crabo & Lafontaine, 2009
- Lasionycta phaea (Hampson, 1905)
- Lasionycta phoca (Möschler, 1864)
- Lasionycta poca (Barnes & Benjamin, 1923)
- ?Lasionycta poliades (Draudt, 1950)
- Lasionycta promulsa (Morrison, 1875)
- Lasionycta proxima (Hübner, [1809])
- Lasionycta pulverea Crabo & Lafontaine, 2009
- Lasionycta quadrilunata (Grote, 1874)
- Lasionycta sasquatch Crabo & Lafontaine, 2009
- Lasionycta secedens (Walker, [1858])
- Lasionycta silacea Crabo & Lafontaine, 2009
- Lasionycta sierra Crabo & Lafontaine, 2009
- Lasionycta skraelingia (Herrich-Schäffer, [1852])
- Lasionycta staudingeri (Aurivillius, 1891)
- Lasionycta subalpina Crabo & Lafontaine, 2009
- Lasionycta subdita (Möschler, 1860)
- Lasionycta subfumosa (Gibson, 1920)
- Lasionycta subfuscula (Grote, 1874)
- Lasionycta taigata Lafontaine, 1988
- Lasionycta uniformis (Smith, 1893)

Lasionycta arietis, Lasionycta insolens, Lasionycta ochracea, Lasionycta sala, Lasionycta wyatti have been transferred to the genus Psammopolia.
