= Lasionycta melanographa =

Scientific classification
- Kingdom: Animalia
- Phylum: Arthropoda
- Clade: Pancrustacea
- Class: Insecta
- Order: Lepidoptera
- Superfamily: Noctuoidea
- Family: Noctuidae
- Genus: Lasionycta
- Species: L. melanographa

Binomial name
- Lasionycta melanographa Varga, 1973

Species of moth

Lasionycta melanographa is a moth of the family Noctuidae. It is found in Afghanistan.
