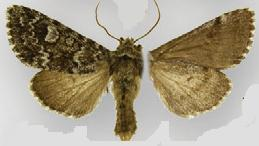

Scientific classification
- Kingdom: Animalia
- Phylum: Arthropoda
- Clade: Pancrustacea
- Class: Insecta
- Order: Lepidoptera
- Superfamily: Noctuoidea
- Family: Noctuidae
- Genus: Lasionycta
- Species: L. taigata

Binomial name
- Lasionycta taigata Lafontaine, 1988
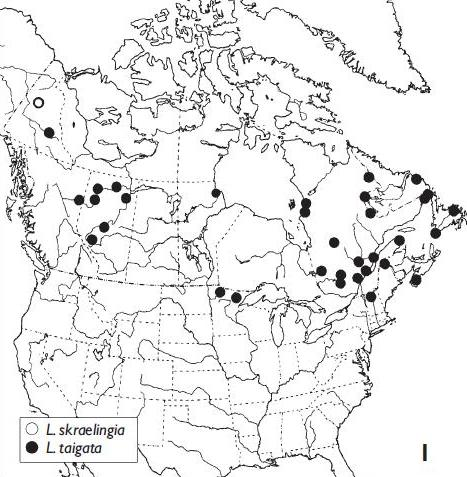
- Range

= Lasionycta taigata =

Species of moth

Lasionycta taigata is a moth of the family Noctuidae. It occurs in open peatlands and fens in the taiga zone from Labrador, Churchill, Manitoba, and central Yukon, southward to northern Maine, northern Minnesota, and south-western Alberta.

Adults are on wing from late June through July.
