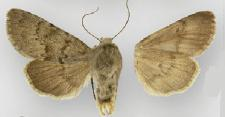
- Male
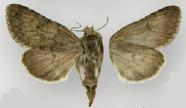
- Female

Scientific classification
- Kingdom: Animalia
- Phylum: Arthropoda
- Clade: Pancrustacea
- Class: Insecta
- Order: Lepidoptera
- Superfamily: Noctuoidea
- Family: Noctuidae
- Genus: Lasionycta
- Species: L. promulsa

Binomial name
- Lasionycta promulsa (Morrison, 1875)

Synonyms
- Mamestra promulsa Morrison, 1875a; Scotogramma promulsa Dyar, 1903; Lasiestra promulsa McDunnough, 1938; Lasionycta promulsa Lafontaine et al., 1986; Scotogramma infuscata Smith, 1899; Lasiestra infuscata McDunnough, 1938; Lasionycta infuscata Lafontaine et al., 1986

= Lasionycta promulsa =

Species of moth

Lasionycta promulsa is a moth of the family Noctuidae. It occurs from Rampart House in northern Yukon to south-western British Columbia in the west and southern New Mexico in the Rocky Mountains.

Adults are on wing from mid-July through August.
