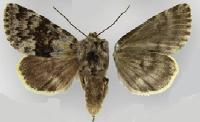

Scientific classification
- Kingdom: Animalia
- Phylum: Arthropoda
- Clade: Pancrustacea
- Class: Insecta
- Order: Lepidoptera
- Superfamily: Noctuoidea
- Family: Noctuidae
- Genus: Lasionycta
- Species: L. caesia

Binomial name
- Lasionycta caesia Crabo & Lafontaine, 2009

= Lasionycta caesia =

Species of moth

Lasionycta caesia is a moth of the family Noctuidae. It occurs in the Cascade Mountains of northern Washington and the British Columbia Coast Range to 58 degrees north latitude.

It occurs in rocky alpine tundra near tree line and is nocturnal.

The wingspan is 30–34 mm for males and 32–35 mm for females. Adults are on wing from mid-July to mid-August.
