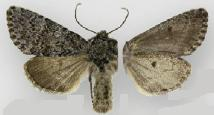
- Male
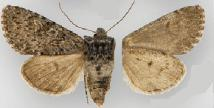
- Female

Scientific classification
- Kingdom: Animalia
- Phylum: Arthropoda
- Clade: Pancrustacea
- Class: Insecta
- Order: Lepidoptera
- Superfamily: Noctuoidea
- Family: Noctuidae
- Genus: Lasionycta
- Species: L. perplexella

Binomial name
- Lasionycta perplexella Crabo & Lafontaine, 2009

= Lasionycta perplexella =

Species of moth

Lasionycta perplexella is a species of moth in the family Noctuidae. It is found from southern Yukon to southern Alberta and southern Washington.

The habitat is subalpine spruce and fir forest.

The wingspan is 30–36 mm for males and 33–36 mm for females. Adults are on wing from mid-July through August.
