= Lasionycta lagganata =

Scientific classification
- Kingdom: Animalia
- Phylum: Arthropoda
- Clade: Pancrustacea
- Class: Insecta
- Order: Lepidoptera
- Superfamily: Noctuoidea
- Family: Noctuidae
- Genus: Lasionycta
- Species: L. lagganata

Binomial name
- Lasionycta lagganata (Barnes & Benjamin, 1924)

Synonyms
- Anarta lagganata Barnes & Benjamin, 1924; Lasiestra lagganata McDunnough, 1938; Lasionycta lagganata Lafontaine et al., 1986

Species of moth

Lasionycta lagganata is a moth of the family Noctuidae first described by William Barnes and Foster Hendrickson Benjamin in 1924. It is only known from three localities in south-western Canada: Banff and Waterton national parks in Alberta and the Purcell Mountains in south-eastern British Columbia.

It is diurnal and flies on fine shale scree slopes with sparse vegetation.

Adults are on wing from mid-July to mid-August.
