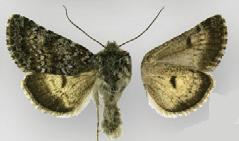

Scientific classification
- Kingdom: Animalia
- Phylum: Arthropoda
- Clade: Pancrustacea
- Class: Insecta
- Order: Lepidoptera
- Superfamily: Noctuoidea
- Family: Noctuidae
- Genus: Lasionycta
- Species: L. illima

Binomial name
- Lasionycta illima Crabo & Lafontaine, 2009

= Lasionycta illima =

Species of moth

Lasionycta illima is a moth of the family Noctuidae. It is found from Pink Mountain in north-eastern British Columbia through southern Yukon to eastern Alaska.

The wingspan is 27 mm for males and 26–28 mm for females.
