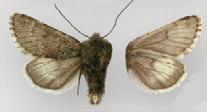

Scientific classification
- Kingdom: Animalia
- Phylum: Arthropoda
- Clade: Pancrustacea
- Class: Insecta
- Order: Lepidoptera
- Superfamily: Noctuoidea
- Family: Noctuidae
- Genus: Lasionycta
- Species: L. subfumosa

Binomial name
- Lasionycta subfumosa (Gibson, 1920)

Synonyms
- Anarta subfumosa Gibson, 1920; Lasiestra leucocycla subfumosa McDunnough 1938; Lasionycta staudingeri subfumosa Lafontaine et al. 1986

= Lasionycta subfumosa =

Species of moth

Lasionycta subfumosa is a moth of the family Noctuidae. It is found from Victoria Island and Banks Island in the Northwest Territories and the Darby Mountains on the Seward Peninsula of Alaska.

It is a diurnal species.

Adults are on wing from late June through July.
