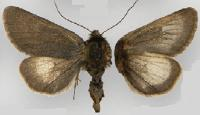

Scientific classification
- Kingdom: Animalia
- Phylum: Arthropoda
- Clade: Pancrustacea
- Class: Insecta
- Order: Lepidoptera
- Superfamily: Noctuoidea
- Family: Noctuidae
- Genus: Lasionycta
- Species: L. carolynae

Binomial name
- Lasionycta carolynae Crabo, 2009

= Lasionycta carolynae =

Species of moth

Lasionycta carolynae is a moth of the family Noctuidae. It is found in the Ogilvie and Richardson Mountains in Yukon.

It is diurnal and flies over shale scree slopes. Adults feed on Dryas octopetala and Silene acaulis in the Ogilvie Mountains and a Saxifraga species in the Richardson Mountains.

The wingspan is 30–32 mm for males and 33 mm for females. Adults are on wing from late June and early July.
