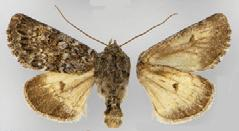

Scientific classification
- Kingdom: Animalia
- Phylum: Arthropoda
- Clade: Pancrustacea
- Class: Insecta
- Order: Lepidoptera
- Superfamily: Noctuoidea
- Family: Noctuidae
- Genus: Lasionycta
- Species: L. flanda

Binomial name
- Lasionycta flanda (Smith, 1908)

Synonyms
- Anarta flanda Smith, 1908; Lasiestra leucocycla flanda McDunnough, 1938; Lasionycta leucocycla flanda Lafontaine et al., 1986

= Lasionycta flanda =

Species of moth

Lasionycta flanda is a moth of the family Noctuidae. It is found on the island of Newfoundland and at Goose Bay in eastern Labrador.

It was formerly considered to be a subspecies of Lasionycta leucocycla.

It is found on tundra.

Adults are on wing from mid-July to early August.
