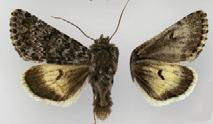
- Lasionycta leucocycla leucocycla male
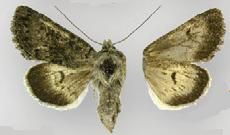
- Lasionycta leucocycla leucocycla female

Scientific classification
- Kingdom: Animalia
- Phylum: Arthropoda
- Clade: Pancrustacea
- Class: Insecta
- Order: Lepidoptera
- Superfamily: Noctuoidea
- Family: Noctuidae
- Genus: Lasionycta
- Species: L. leucocycla

Binomial name
- Lasionycta leucocycla (Staudinger, 1857)

Synonyms
- Anarta leucocycla Staudinger, 1857; Lasiestra leucocycla McDunnough 1938; Anarta leucocycla var. moeschleri Staudinger, 1901; Anarta staudingeri ab. moeschleri Hampson 1905; Anarta staudingeri moeschleri Warren, 1912; Anarta leucocycla moeschleri McDunnough, 1925; Lasiestra leucocycla moeschleri McDunnough, 1938; Lasionycta leucocycla moeschleri Lafontaine et al., 1986; Anarta hampa Smith, 1908; Lasiestra leucocycla hampa McDunnough, 1938; Lasionycta leucocycla hampa Lafontaine et al., 1986; Anarta leucocycla albertensis McDunnough, 1925; Lasiestra leucocycla albertensis McDunnough, 1938; Lasionycta leucocycla albertensis Lafontaine et al., 1986; Lasionycta leucocycla magadanensis Kononenko and Lafontaine, 1986

= Lasionycta leucocycla =

Species of moth

Lasionycta leucocycla is a species of moth of the family Noctuidae. It can be found in Scandinavia, Siberia and northern North America.

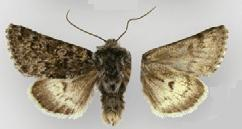
Lasionycta leucocycla hampa

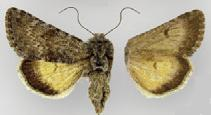
Lasionycta leucocycla hampa female

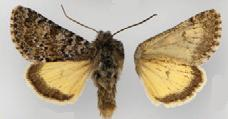
Lasionycta leucocycla hampa male

The wingspan is 22–28 mm. The moths fly from June to July.

Adults feed on the nectar of Silene acaulis, Mertensia paniculata and Senecio species, probably Senecio lugens.

The larvae feed on Dryas octopetala and Astragalus species.

== Subspecies ==
- Lasionycta leucocycla dovrensis (northern Europe)
- Lasionycta leucocycla altaica (Altai)
- Lasionycta leucocycla leucocycla (arctic North America from Greenland and Ellesmere Island west to northern Yukon)
- Lasionycta leucocycla moeschleri (eastern Canada from the east coast of Hudson Bay and southern Labrador north to the arctic islands near the Ungava Peninsula, Quebec)
- Lasionycta leucocycla hampa (White Mountains of New Hampshire)
- Lasionycta leucocycla albertensis (west-central Alaska and central Yukon southward in the Rocky Mountains to the Beartooth Plateau on the Montana-Wyoming border and the Russian Far East)
- Lasionycta leucocycla magadanensis (Eurasia)

Lasionycta leucocycla dovrensis is formally treated as a subspecies of Lasionycta leucocycla, but might be a valid species, in which case Lasionycta leucocycla altaica would probably be a subspecies of Lasionycta dovrensis.

== Former subspecies ==
- Lasionycta leucocycla kenteana (Kentei)
- Lasionycta leucocycla mongolica (Uliassutai)
- Lasionycta leucocycla subfumosa (Northwest Territories)

Lasionycta leucocycla flanda was raised to species level as Lasionycta flanda.
