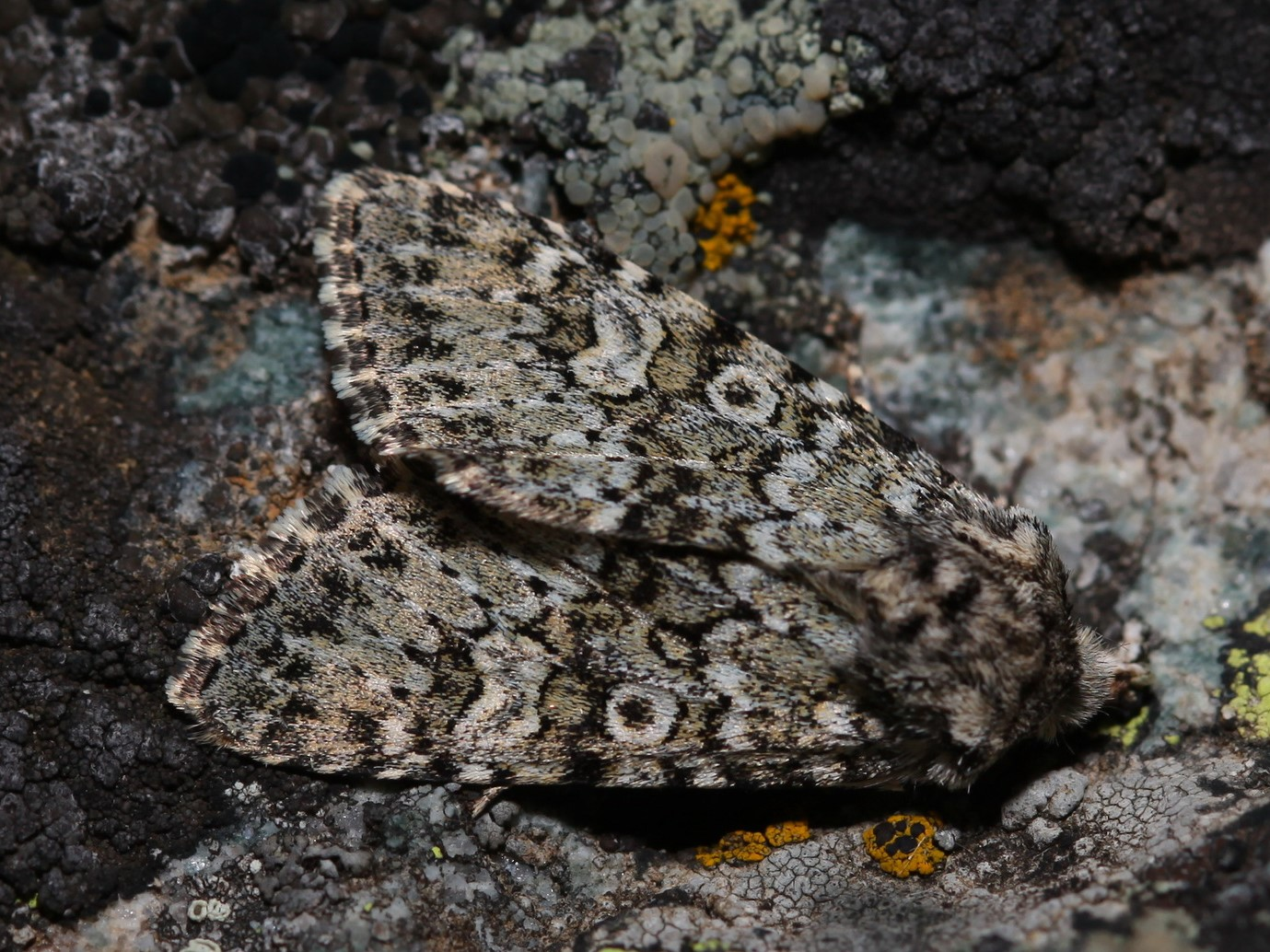

Scientific classification
- Kingdom: Animalia
- Phylum: Arthropoda
- Clade: Pancrustacea
- Class: Insecta
- Order: Lepidoptera
- Superfamily: Noctuoidea
- Family: Noctuidae
- Genus: Lasionycta
- Species: L. hampsoni

Binomial name
- Lasionycta hampsoni Varga, 1974

= Lasionycta hampsoni =

Species of moth

Lasionycta hampsoni is a species of moth in the family Noctuidae. It is found in the South Siberian Mountains.
