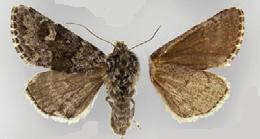

Scientific classification
- Kingdom: Animalia
- Phylum: Arthropoda
- Clade: Pancrustacea
- Class: Insecta
- Order: Lepidoptera
- Superfamily: Noctuoidea
- Family: Noctuidae
- Genus: Lasionycta
- Species: L. phaea

Binomial name
- Lasionycta phaea (Hampson, 1905)

Synonyms
- Anarta phaea Hampson, 1905; Lasiestra impingens phaea McDunnough 1938

= Lasionycta phaea =

Species of moth

Lasionycta phaea is a moth of the family Noctuidae. It is an arctic species and has been collected from Baffin Island in north-eastern Canada to the central Brooks Range in northern Alaska and southward along the west coast of Hudson Bay to Arviat, Nunavut.

Adults are diurnal and occur on wet tundra. Adults are on wing from late June to mid-July.
