= Lasionycta mono =

Scientific classification
- Kingdom: Animalia
- Phylum: Arthropoda
- Clade: Pancrustacea
- Class: Insecta
- Order: Lepidoptera
- Superfamily: Noctuoidea
- Family: Noctuidae
- Genus: Lasionycta
- Species: L. mono

Binomial name
- Lasionycta mono Crabo & Lafontaine, 2009

Species of moth

Lasionycta mono is a moth of the family Noctuidae. This species is known only from the type locality in the Sierra Nevada.

The habitat is most likely rocky tundra.

The wingspan is about 26 mm.
