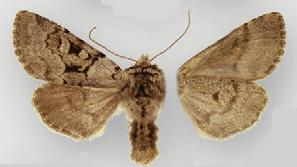

Scientific classification
- Kingdom: Animalia
- Phylum: Arthropoda
- Clade: Pancrustacea
- Class: Insecta
- Order: Lepidoptera
- Superfamily: Noctuoidea
- Family: Noctuidae
- Genus: Lasionycta
- Species: L. conjugata

Binomial name
- Lasionycta conjugata (Smith, 1899)

Synonyms
- Scotogramma conjugata Smith, 1899

= Lasionycta conjugata =

Species of moth

Lasionycta conjugata is a moth of the family Noctuidae. It is found in the Rocky Mountains from central Utah and Colorado north to the Beartooth Plateau on the Montana-Wyoming border.

It is found in subalpine forests and is nocturnal.

Adults are on wing from early July to late August.
