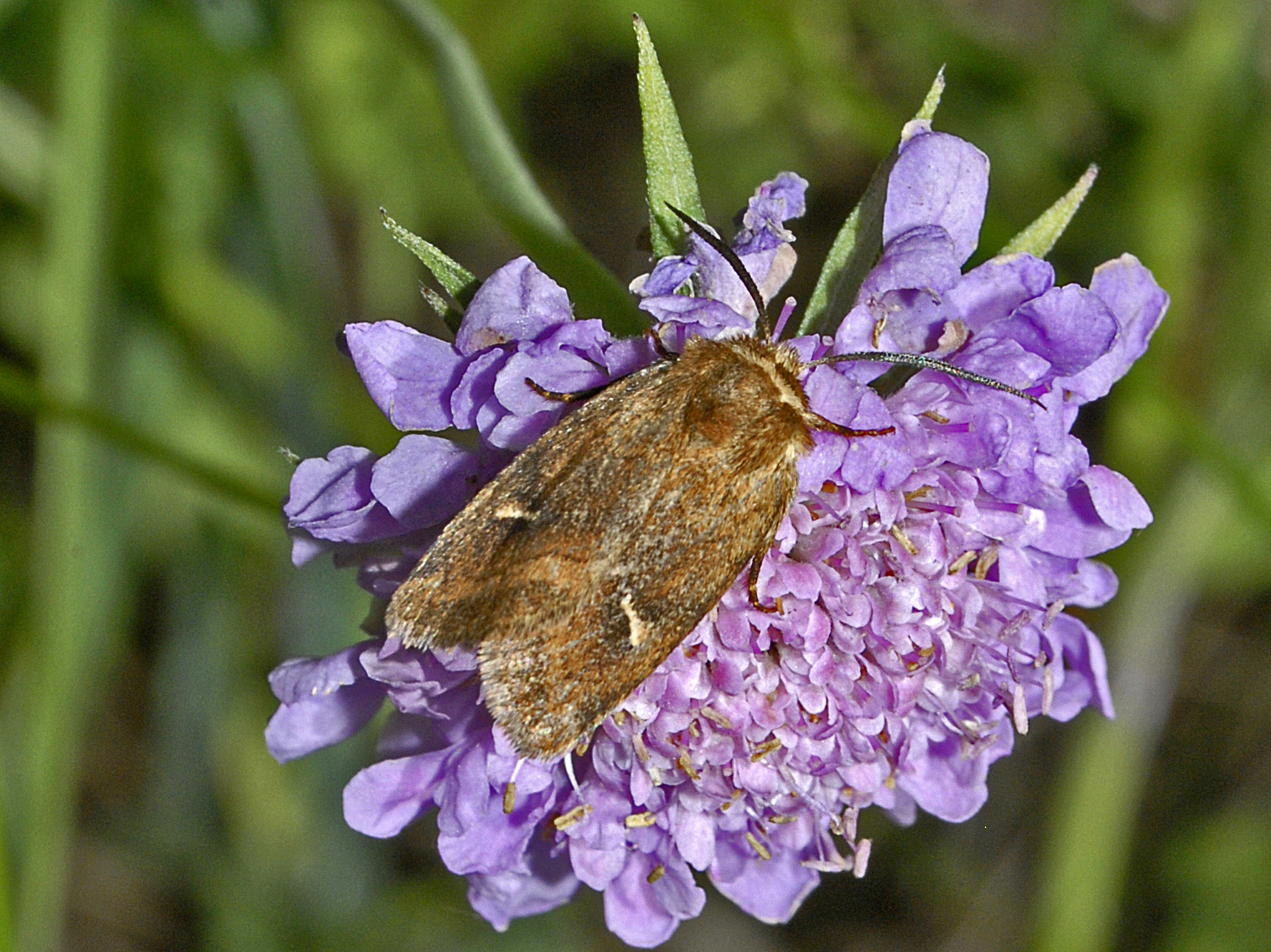

Scientific classification
- Kingdom: Animalia
- Phylum: Arthropoda
- Class: Insecta
- Order: Lepidoptera
- Superfamily: Noctuoidea
- Family: Noctuidae
- Genus: Eriopygodes
- Species: E. imbecilla

Binomial name
- Eriopygodes imbecilla (Fabricius, 1794)

Synonyms
- Eriopygodes imbecillus (Fabricius, 1794); Lasionycta imbecilla (Fabricius, 1794); Noctua imbecilla Fabricius, 1794

= Eriopygodes imbecilla =

Species of moth

Eriopygodes imbecilla, the Silurian, is a moth of the family Noctuidae first described by Johan Christian Fabricius in 1794.

== Distribution ==
This species is present in most of Europe.

== Habitat ==
This species commonly lives on gullies and hollows in high moorland areas with host plants.

== Description ==
The wingspan is 24–27 mm. The colour of these small moths may vary from tawny to reddish brown. Forewings usually show a pale kidney mark and two wavy cross lines, but often these markings are quite indistinct. Usually females are darker or chocolate brown and smaller than the males. The rear wings are often pale greyish. Seitz describes it E. imbecilla F. (= aliena male Hbn., alpina female Hbn., disparilis O., nexa Dup.) Forewing rufous ochreous, sometimes grey-tinged, in the male, rufous brown in the female; veins finely brownish; inner and outer lines brown; submarginal obscure, the marginal area beyond it generally darker; reniform stigma externally whitish, preceded by a brownish median shade; hindwing greyish fuscous : fringe rufous. — Larva dirty grey, with a few yellowish grey hairs; dorsal line fine, whitish, traversing a series of black or brown oval blotches : lateral stripes dark grey, with a pale line at middle; spiracles black, each with a shining black point above it; head blackish, with 3 white lines.

== Biology ==
Adults fly from June to July. Larvae are polyphagous on low plants, mainly feeding on bilberry (Vaccinium myrtillus), heath bedstraw (Galium saxatile), Knautia and Lamium.
