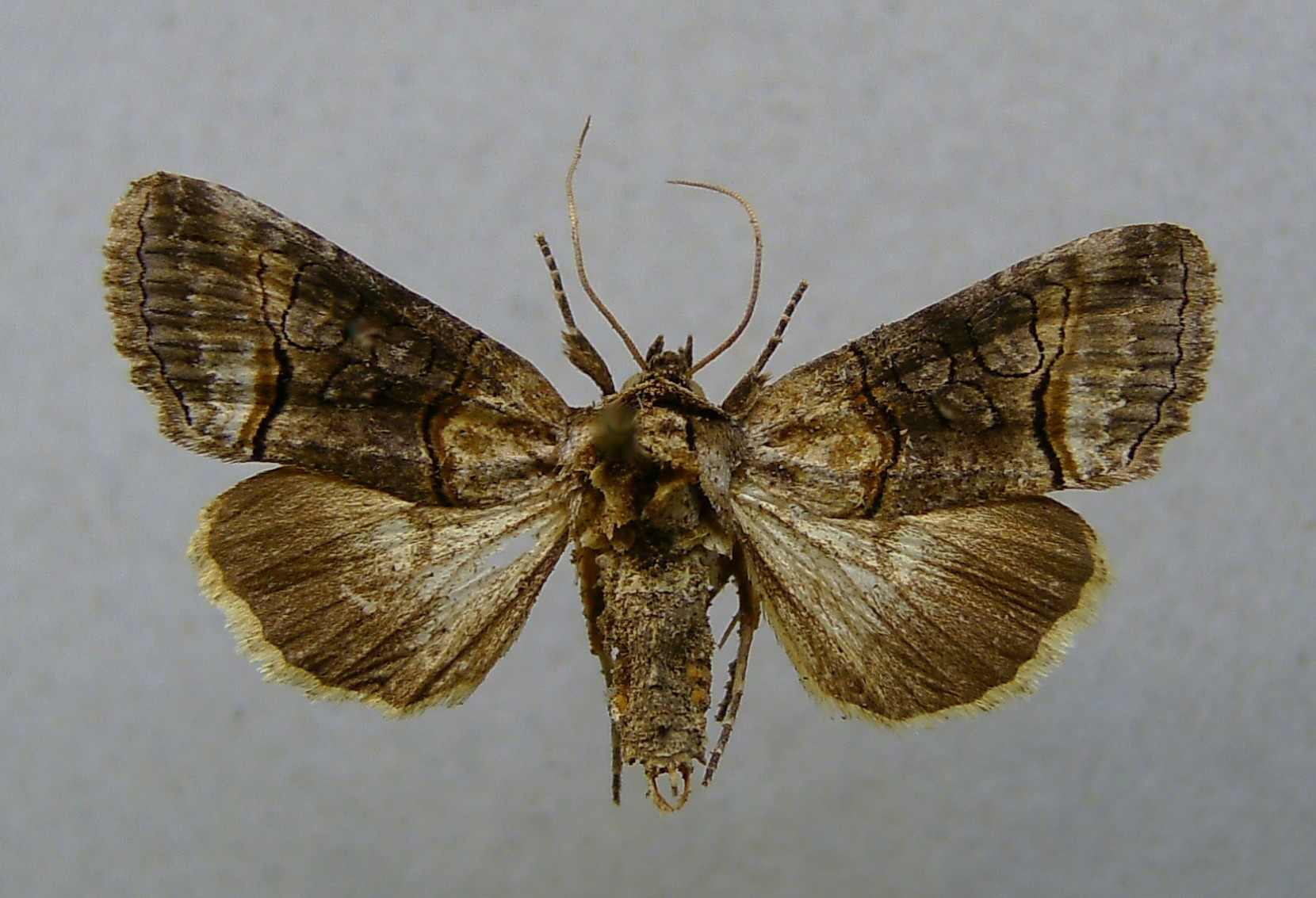

Scientific classification
- Kingdom: Animalia
- Phylum: Arthropoda
- Clade: Pancrustacea
- Class: Insecta
- Order: Lepidoptera
- Superfamily: Noctuoidea
- Family: Noctuidae
- Genus: Abrostola
- Species: A. asclepiadis

Binomial name
- Abrostola asclepiadis (Denis & Schiffermüller, 1775)

Synonyms
- Noctua asclepiadis; Abrostola asclepiadis var. jagowi; Abrostola asclepiades[sic] pardoi

= Abrostola asclepiadis =

Species of moth

Abrostola asclepiadis is a moth of the family Noctuidae. It is found in South and Central Europe as far north as Finland and Sweden, Asia Minor and the Caucasus.

== Technical description and variation ==
A. asclepiadis Schiff. Scarcely distinguishable in the imago state from triplasia L., but differing altogether in the larva; this is bluish white, tinged with green on the thoracic segments, dotted with black; the dorsal tubercles large; lateral stripe broadly yellow; on each segment above it a large black dot, beneath it two large black dots and several smaller ones; head greenish yellow, with black dots: in the ab. jagowi Bartel from the Engadine, the basal area is not tinged with pink and is without dark markings. The wingspan is 30–40 mm.

== Biology ==
Adults are on wing from June to August depending on the location.

The larvae feed on Vincetoxicum hirundinaria, which contains toxic alkaloids and is unpalatable to most generalist herbivores.
