= Abrostola agnorista =

Scientific classification
- Kingdom: Animalia
- Phylum: Arthropoda
- Class: Insecta
- Order: Lepidoptera
- Superfamily: Noctuoidea
- Family: Noctuidae
- Genus: Abrostola
- Species: A. agnorista

Binomial name
- Abrostola agnorista Dufay, 1956

Species of moth

Abrostola agnorista is a moth of the family Noctuidae. It is found in Romania, ex-Yugoslavia, Albania, Bulgaria, Greece, Italy, France and Hungary.

The wingspan is 24–32 mm. It is very similar to Abrostola triplasia and the two species can only be distinguished by a genital examination . Adults are on wing from May to September in two generations depending on the location.

The larvae feed on Parietaria officinalis and Urtica species.
