= Abrostola microvalis =

Scientific classification
- Domain: Eukaryota
- Kingdom: Animalia
- Phylum: Arthropoda
- Class: Insecta
- Order: Lepidoptera
- Superfamily: Noctuoidea
- Family: Noctuidae
- Tribe: Abrostolini
- Genus: Abrostola
- Species: A. microvalis

Binomial name
- Abrostola microvalis Ottolengui, 1919

Species of moth

Abrostola microvalis, the minute oval abrostola, is a species of looper moth in the family Noctuidae. It is found in North America.

The MONA or Hodges number for Abrostola microvalis is 8883.
