= Abrostola violacea =

Scientific classification
- Domain: Eukaryota
- Kingdom: Animalia
- Phylum: Arthropoda
- Class: Insecta
- Order: Lepidoptera
- Superfamily: Noctuoidea
- Family: Noctuidae
- Genus: Abrostola
- Species: A. violacea

Binomial name
- Abrostola violacea Dufay, 1958

Species of moth

Abrostola violacea is a moth of the family Noctuidae. It is found in Africa. The type location is the Ngorongoro Crater (Tanganyka, Arusha).
