= Abrostola canariensis =

Conservation status
- Least Concern (IUCN 3.1)

Scientific classification
- Kingdom: Animalia
- Phylum: Arthropoda
- Clade: Pancrustacea
- Class: Insecta
- Order: Lepidoptera
- Superfamily: Noctuoidea
- Family: Noctuidae
- Genus: Abrostola
- Species: A. canariensis

Binomial name
- Abrostola canariensis Hampson, 1913

Species of moth

Abrostola canariensis is a moth of the family Noctuidae. It is endemic to the Canary Islands.
