= Abrostola bettoni =

Scientific classification
- Domain: Eukaryota
- Kingdom: Animalia
- Phylum: Arthropoda
- Class: Insecta
- Order: Lepidoptera
- Superfamily: Noctuoidea
- Family: Noctuidae
- Genus: Abrostola
- Species: A. bettoni

Binomial name
- Abrostola bettoni Dufay, 1958

Species of moth

Abrostola bettoni is a moth of the family Noctuidae. It is found in Kenya.
