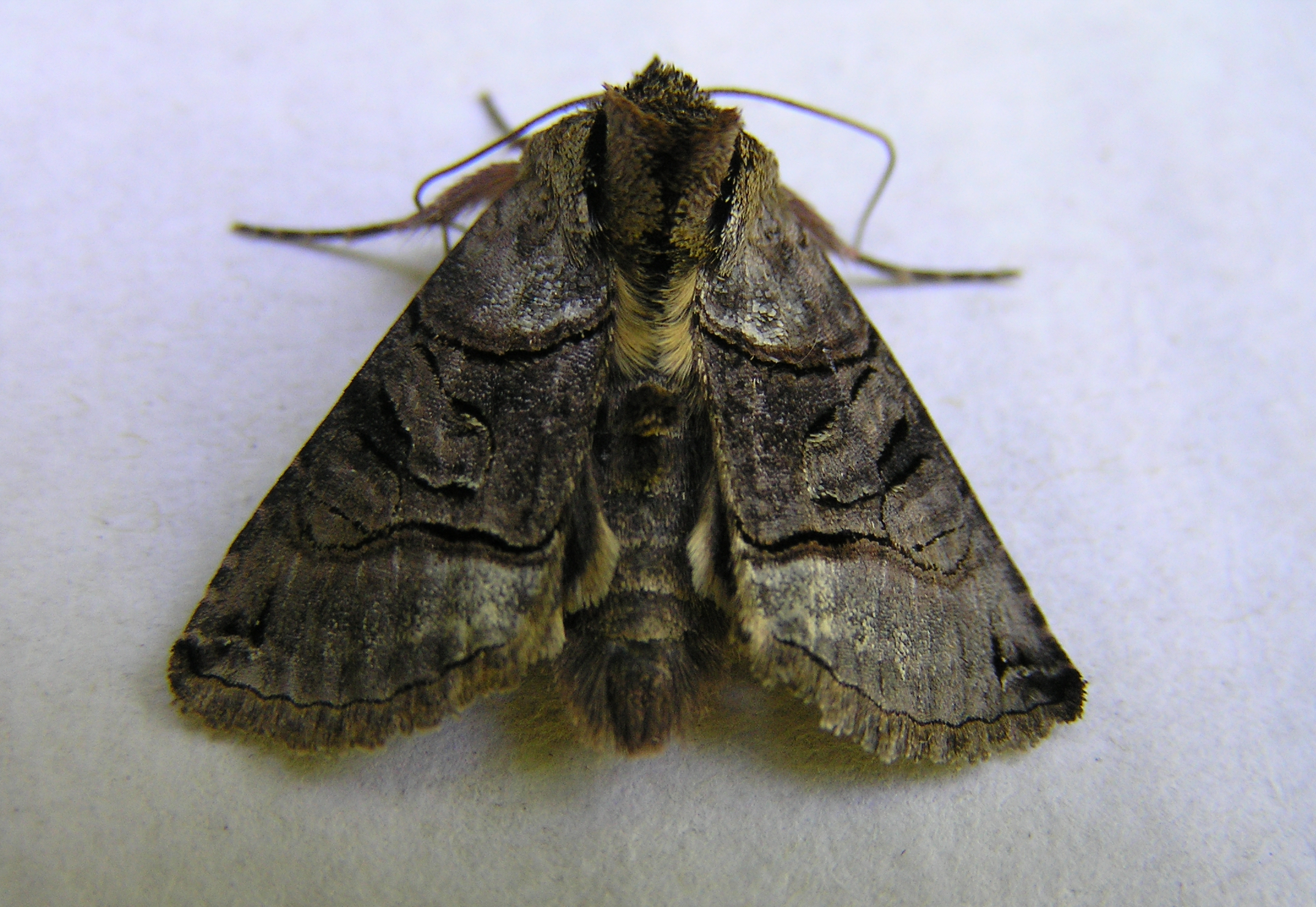
- Abrostola tripartita

Scientific classification
- Domain: Eukaryota
- Kingdom: Animalia
- Phylum: Arthropoda
- Class: Insecta
- Order: Lepidoptera
- Superfamily: Noctuoidea
- Family: Noctuidae
- Tribe: Abrostolini
- Genus: Abrostola; Ochsenheimer, 1816

= Abrostola =

Genus of moths

Abrostola is a genus of moths of the family Noctuidae.

== Species ==
- Abrostola abrostolina Butler, 1879
- Abrostola agnorista Dufay, 1956
- Abrostola anophioides Moore, 1882
- Abrostola asclepiadis Denis & Schiffermüller, 1775
- Abrostola bettoni Dufay, 1958
- Abrostola brevipennis Dufay, 1958
- Abrostola canariensis Hampson, 1913
- Abrostola clarissa Staudinger, 1900
- Abrostola confusa Dufay, 1958
- Abrostola congolensis Dufay, 1958
- Abrostola dejeani Dufay, 1958
- Abrostola fallax Dufay, 1975
- Abrostola gabori Ronkay, 1987
- Abrostola hyrcanica Hacker & Ebert, 2002
- Abrostola imitatrix Dufay, 1975
- Abrostola karsholti Ronkay & Thöny, 1997
- Abrostola kaszabi Dufay, 1971
- Abrostola korbi Dufay, 1958
- Abrostola major Dufay, 1958
- Abrostola marmorea Dufay, 1958
- Abrostola microvalis Ottolengui, 1919 – Minute Oval Abrostola Moth
- Abrostola obliqua Dufay, 1958
- Abrostola obscura Dufay, 1958
- Abrostola oculea Dufay, 1958
- Abrostola ovalis Guenée, 1852 – Oval Abrostola Moth
- Abrostola pacifica Dufay, 1960
- Abrostola parvula Barnes & McDunnough, 1916
- Abrostola peruviana Ronkay & Thöny, 1997
- Abrostola proxima Dufay, 1958
- Abrostola pulverea Dufay, 1958
- Abrostola rougeoti Dufay, 1977
- Abrostola schintlmeisteri Behounek & Ronkay, 1999
- Abrostola sugii Dufay, 1960
- Abrostola suisharyonis Strand, 1920
- Abrostola triopis Hampson, 1902
- Abrostola tripartita Hufnagel, 1766 – The Spectacle
- Abrostola triplasia Linnaeus, 1758 – Dark Spectacle
- Abrostola ugartii Ronkay & Thöny, 1997
- Abrostola urentis Guenée, 1852 – Spectacled Nettle Moth
- Abrostola ussuriensis Dufay, 1958
- Abrostola violacea Dufay, 1958
