= Abrostola anophioides =

Scientific classification
- Domain: Eukaryota
- Kingdom: Animalia
- Phylum: Arthropoda
- Class: Insecta
- Order: Lepidoptera
- Superfamily: Noctuoidea
- Family: Noctuidae
- Genus: Abrostola
- Species: A. anophioides

Binomial name
- Abrostola anophioides Moore, 1882

Species of moth

Abrostola anophioides is a moth of the family Noctuidae first described by Frederic Moore in 1882. It is found in South-east Asia, including Darjeeling and Taiwan.
