= Abrostola brevipennis =

Scientific classification
- Domain: Eukaryota
- Kingdom: Animalia
- Phylum: Arthropoda
- Class: Insecta
- Order: Lepidoptera
- Superfamily: Noctuoidea
- Family: Noctuidae
- Genus: Abrostola
- Species: A. brevipennis

Binomial name
- Abrostola brevipennis Dufay, 1958

Synonyms
- Xylina brevipennis

Species of moth

Abrostola brevipennis is a moth of the family Noctuidae. It is found from Kenya to South Africa.

== Subpspecies ==
There are two recognised subspecies:

- Abrostola brevipennis brevipennis
- Abrostola brevipennis nairobiensis (Nairobi)
