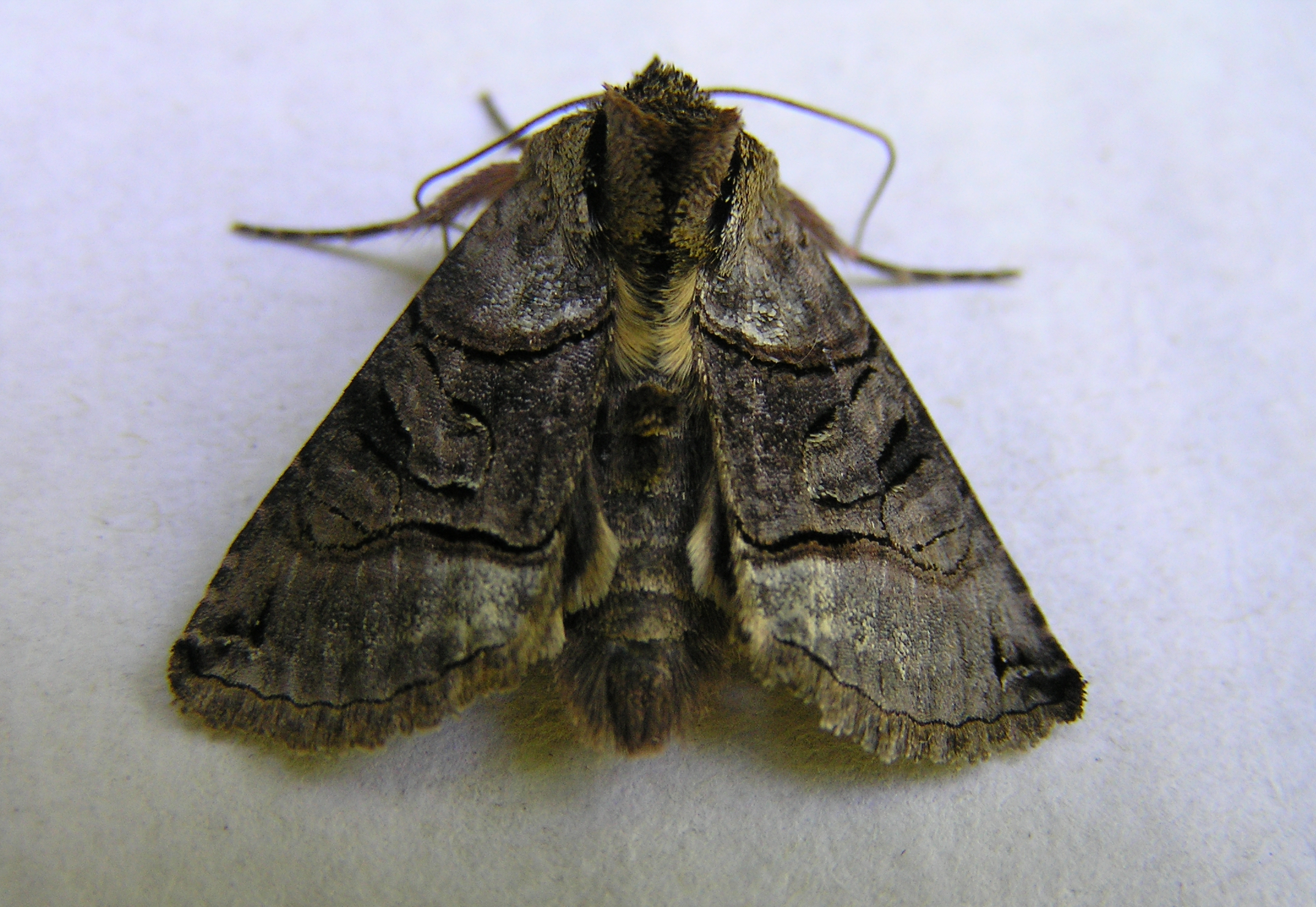

Scientific classification
- Domain: Eukaryota
- Kingdom: Animalia
- Phylum: Arthropoda
- Class: Insecta
- Order: Lepidoptera
- Superfamily: Noctuoidea
- Family: Noctuidae
- Genus: Abrostola
- Species: A. tripartita

Binomial name
- Abrostola tripartita (Hufnagel, 1766)

Synonyms
- Phalaena tripartita; Noctua urticae

= Abrostola tripartita =

Spectacle

Species of moth

Abrostola tripartita (the spectacle) is a moth of the family Noctuidae. It is found throughout much of the Palearctic realm, including most of Europe (except for Iceland), as well as Russia, Siberia, the Amur region, Kyrgyzstan, and Kazakhstan.

== Description ==
From South (1907): "This species, has the basal and outer marginal areas of the forewings whitish grey, finely mottled with darker grey; the central area is greyish brown, mottled with darker brown. The spectacle mark in front of the thorax is whitish grey, ringed with black, and the raised scales on the crosslines and central area of the fore wings are more distinct in this species" [than in Abrostola triplasia]

The larvae feed on Urtica species.

== Gallery ==
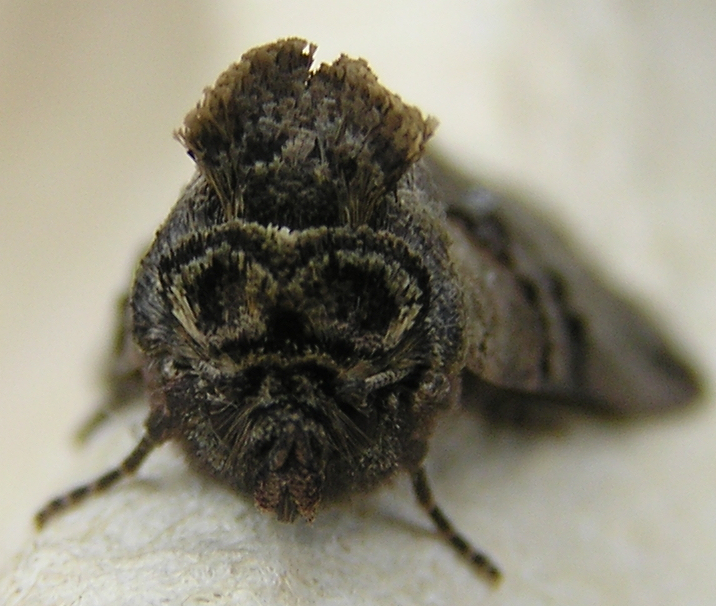
Spectacles of spectacle

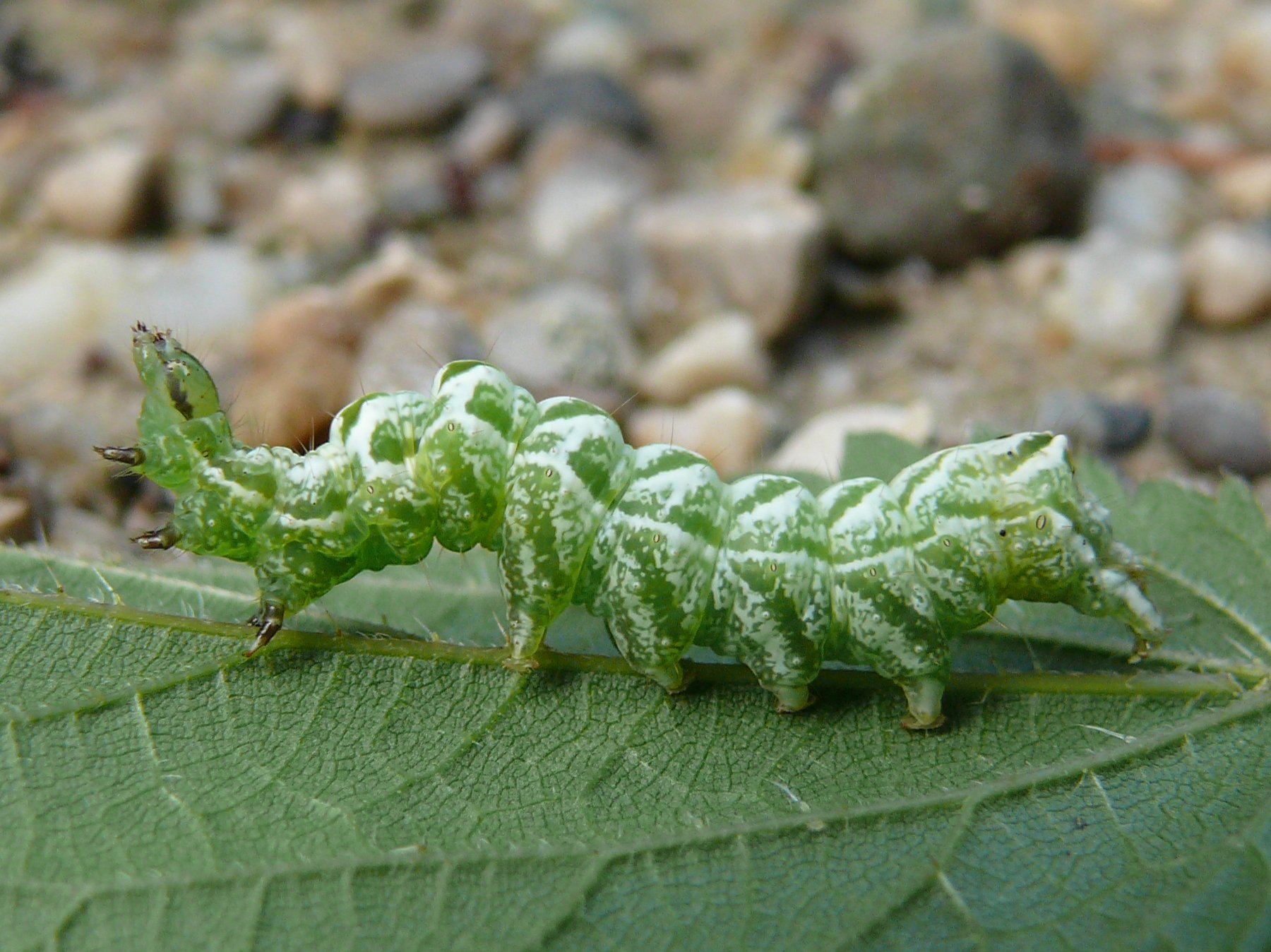
Larva

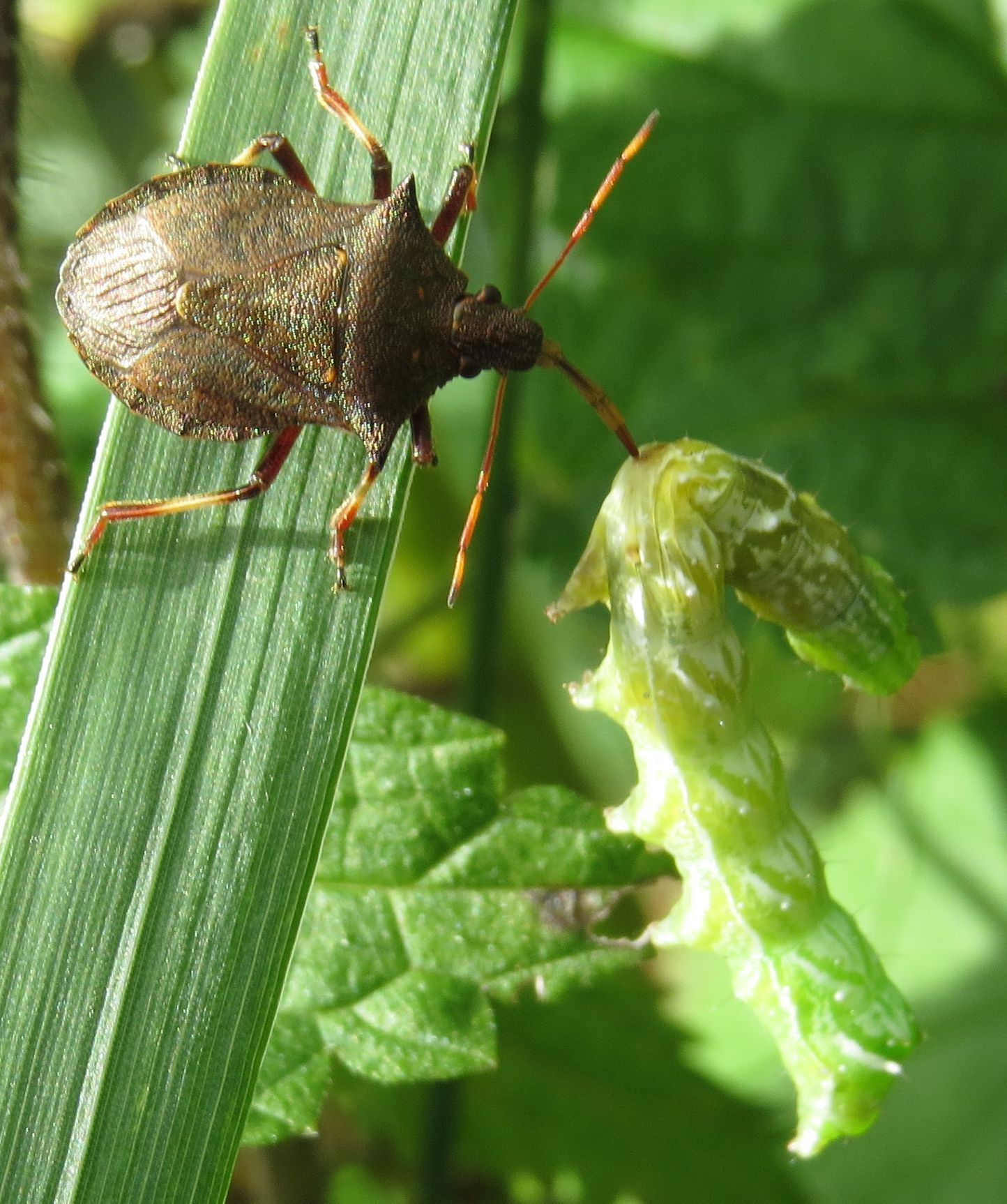
Abrostola tripartita larva attacked by Picromerus bidens

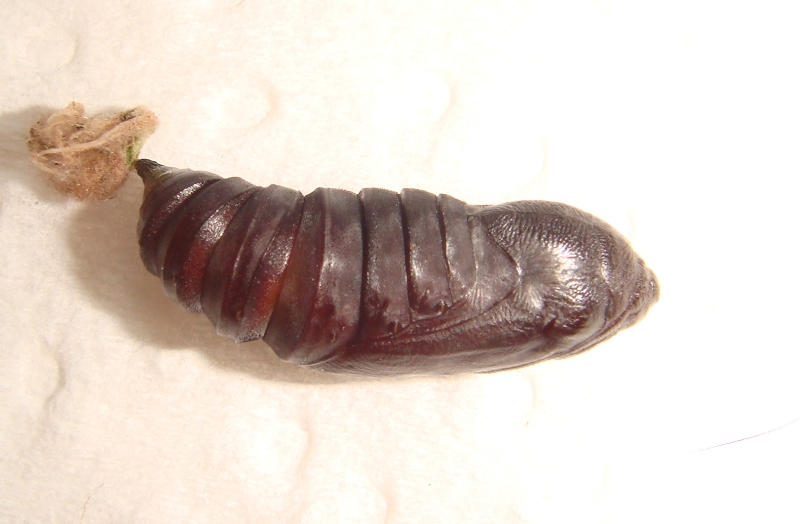
Pupa
