= Abrostola ussuriensis =

Scientific classification
- Kingdom: Animalia
- Phylum: Arthropoda
- Clade: Pancrustacea
- Class: Insecta
- Order: Lepidoptera
- Superfamily: Noctuoidea
- Family: Noctuidae
- Genus: Abrostola
- Species: A. ussuriensis

Binomial name
- Abrostola ussuriensis Dufay, 1958

Species of moth

Abrostola ussuriensis is a moth of the family Noctuidae. It is found in Eastern Asia, including Russia, Korea, Japan and recently also China.

The wingspan is 33–35 mm.
