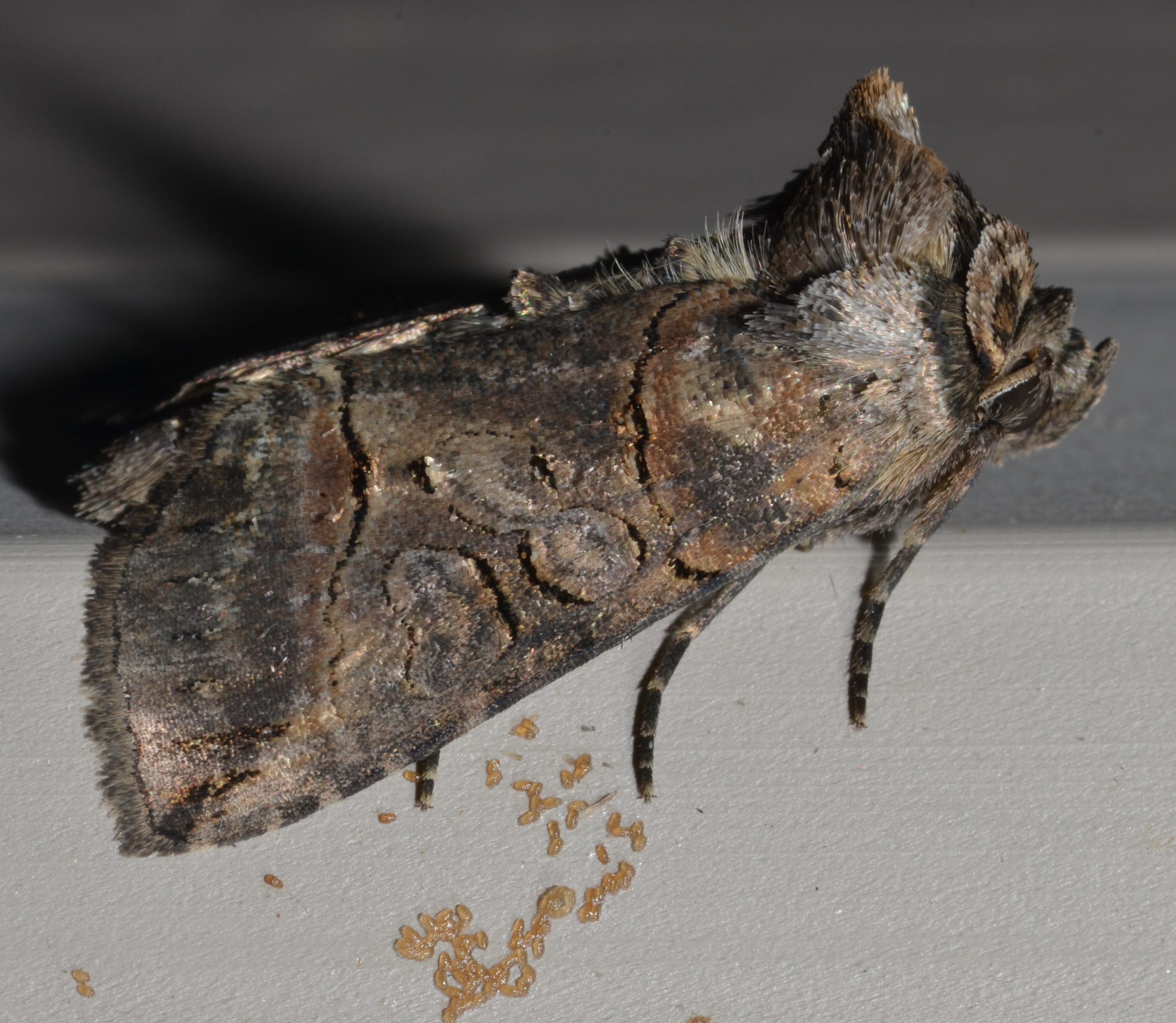

Scientific classification
- Kingdom: Animalia
- Phylum: Arthropoda
- Class: Insecta
- Order: Lepidoptera
- Superfamily: Noctuoidea
- Family: Noctuidae
- Genus: Abrostola
- Species: A. urentis

Binomial name
- Abrostola urentis Guenée, 1852

= Abrostola urentis =

Species of moth

Abrostola urentis, the spectacled nettle moth or variegated brindle, is a moth of the family Noctuidae. The species was first described by Achille Guenée in 1852. It is found in North America from Nova Scotia west across Canada to Vancouver Island, south to North Carolina, Missouri, Texas, Colorado and Oregon.

The wingspan is 30–32 mm. Adults are on wing from June to July in one generation depending on the location.

The larvae feed on Urtica dioica.
