= Abrostola clarissa =

Scientific classification
- Kingdom: Animalia
- Phylum: Arthropoda
- Class: Insecta
- Order: Lepidoptera
- Superfamily: Noctuoidea
- Family: Noctuidae
- Genus: Abrostola
- Species: A. clarissa

Binomial name
- Abrostola clarissa (Staudinger, 1900)

Synonyms
- Plusia triplasia clarissa Staudinger, 1900

Species of moth

Abrostola clarissa is a species of moth of the family Noctuidae. It is widespread from Turkey to south-western Iran, the Caucasian Region and northern Iraq. In the Levant it is recorded from Syria, Lebanon and Israel.

Adults are on wing from May to June. There is one generation per year.
