= Abrostola ovalis =

Oval abrostola

Scientific classification
- Kingdom: Animalia
- Phylum: Arthropoda
- Class: Insecta
- Order: Lepidoptera
- Superfamily: Noctuoidea
- Family: Noctuidae
- Genus: Abrostola
- Species: A. ovalis

Binomial name
- Abrostola ovalis Guenée, 1852

Species of moth

Abrostola ovalis, the oval abrostola, is a moth of the family Noctuidae. The species was first described by Achille Guenée in 1852. It is found in north-eastern North America from southern Quebec and Maine south to North Carolina and west to Wisconsin.

The wingspan is about 30 mm. Adults are on wing from May to August. There is one generation per year in the north. There might be a partial second generation or two full generations in the south.

The larvae feed on Urtica dioica and probably other nettle species.
