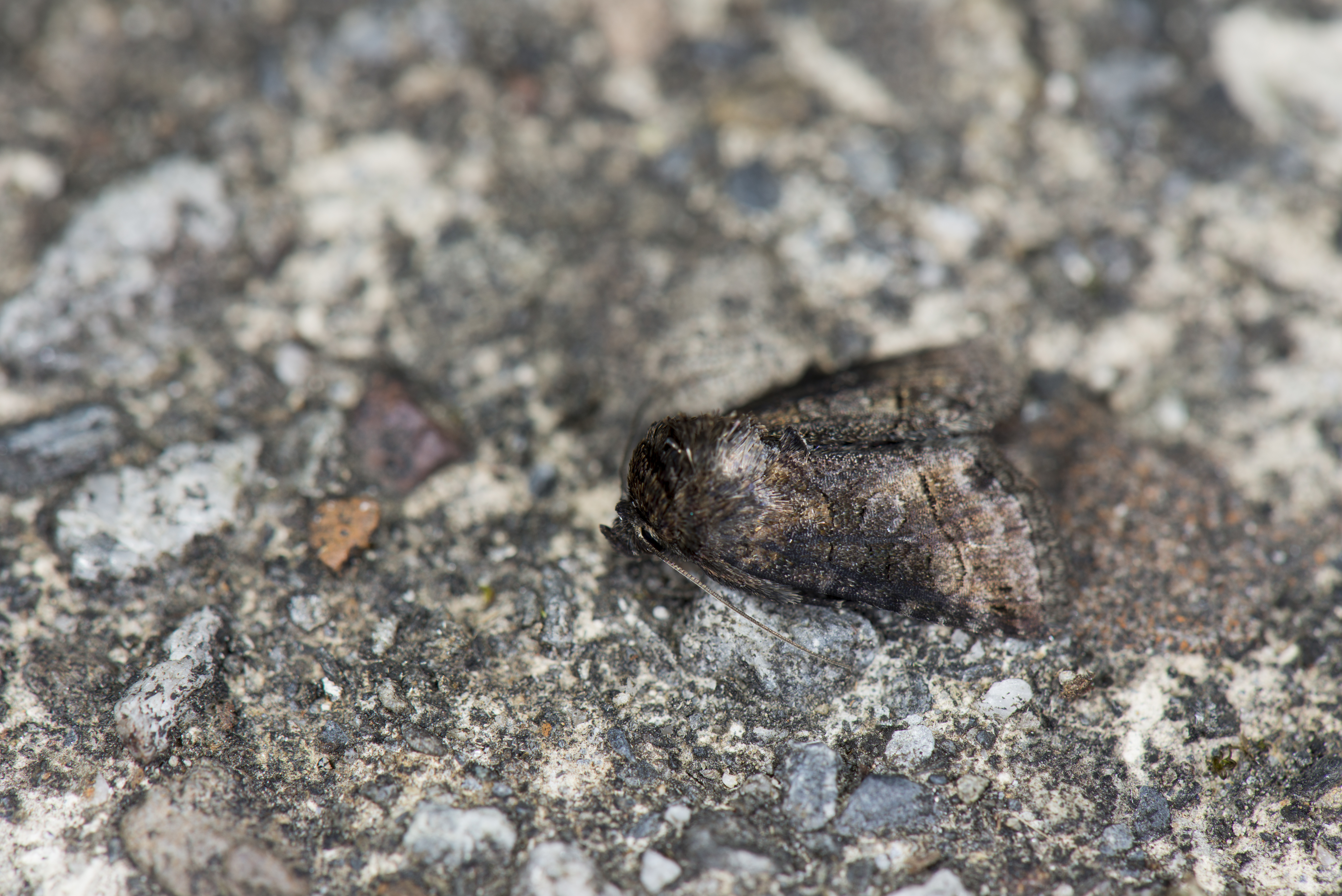

Scientific classification
- Domain: Eukaryota
- Kingdom: Animalia
- Phylum: Arthropoda
- Class: Insecta
- Order: Lepidoptera
- Superfamily: Noctuoidea
- Family: Noctuidae
- Genus: Abrostola
- Species: A. abrostolina

Binomial name
- Abrostola abrostolina Butler, 1879

Synonyms
- Inguridia abrostolina; Abrostola tocionis

= Abrostola abrostolina =

Species of moth

Abrostola abrostolina is a moth of the family Noctuidae. It is found in Japan and Korea.

The wingspan is 25–27 mm.
