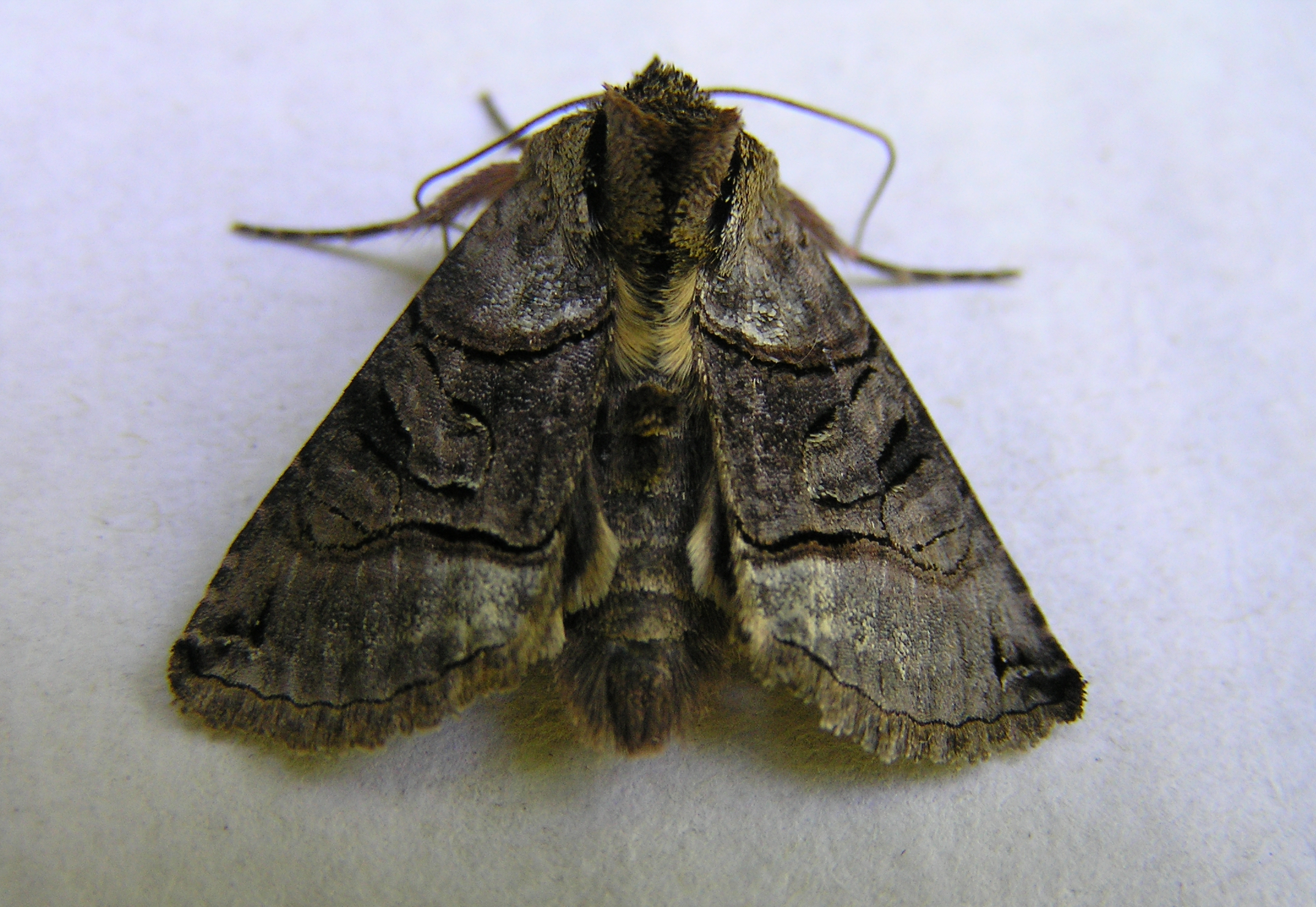
- Abrostola tripartita

Scientific classification
- Domain: Eukaryota
- Kingdom: Animalia
- Phylum: Arthropoda
- Class: Insecta
- Order: Lepidoptera
- Superfamily: Noctuoidea
- Family: Noctuidae
- Subfamily: Plusiinae
- Tribe: Abrostolini; Eichlin & Cunningham, 1978

Genera
- Abrostola Ochsenheimer, 1816; Mouralia Walker, 1858

= Abrostolini =

Tribe of moths

The Abrostolini are a small tribe of moths in the Plusiinae subfamily, consisting of the genera Abrostola and Mouralia.
