= Abrostola parvula =

Scientific classification
- Kingdom: Animalia
- Phylum: Arthropoda
- Class: Insecta
- Order: Lepidoptera
- Superfamily: Noctuoidea
- Family: Noctuidae
- Genus: Abrostola
- Species: A. parvula

Binomial name
- Abrostola parvula Barnes & McDunnough, 1916

Species of moth

Abrostola parvula is a species of looper moth in the family Noctuidae. It was first described by William Barnes and James Halliday McDunnough in 1916 and it is found in North America.

The MONA or Hodges number for Abrostola parvula is 8882.
