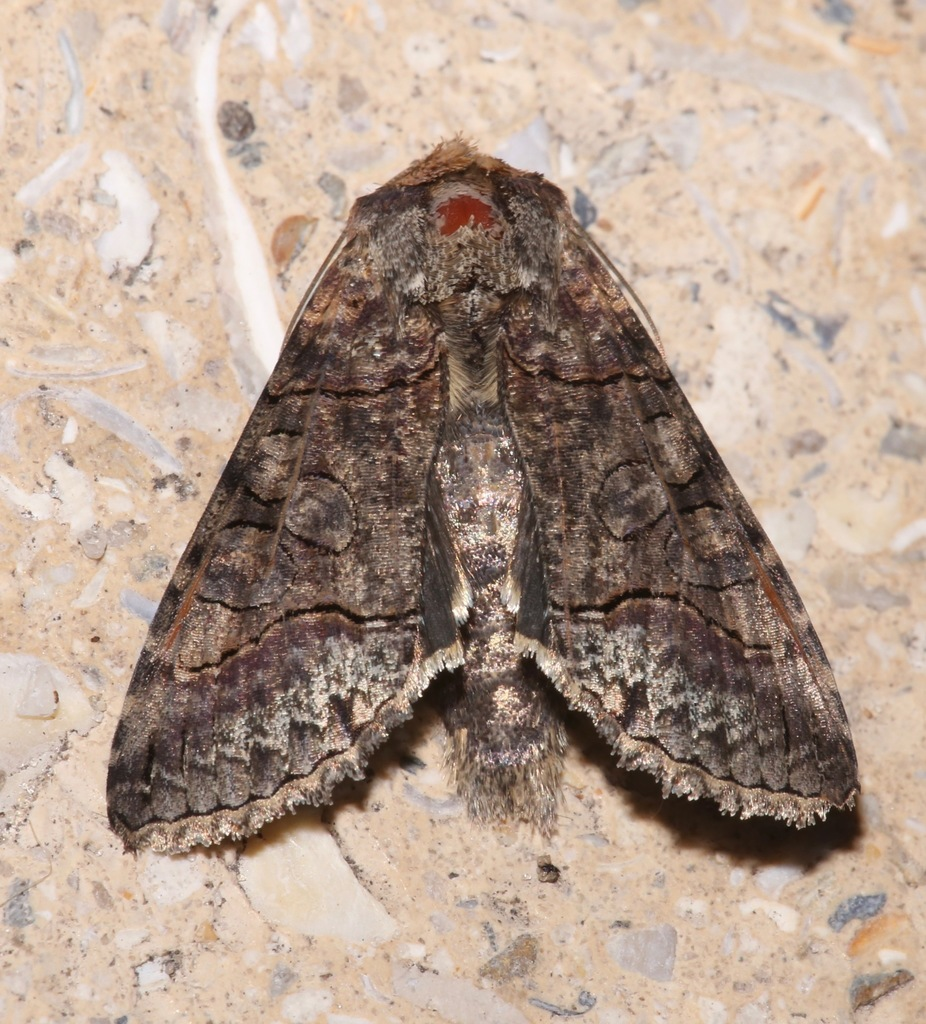

Scientific classification
- Kingdom: Animalia
- Phylum: Arthropoda
- Clade: Pancrustacea
- Class: Insecta
- Order: Lepidoptera
- Superfamily: Noctuoidea
- Family: Noctuidae
- Subfamily: Plusiinae
- Genus: Mouralia; Walker, 1858
- Species: M. tinctoides

Binomial name
- Mouralia tinctoides Guenée, 1852

Synonyms
- Abrostola tinctoides; Mouralia annulifera; Nystalea cossoides

= Mouralia =

Genus of moths

Mouralia is a genus of moths of the family Noctuidae, consisting of only one species Mouralia tinctoides. It is found from Florida to South-east Texas, Georgia, Southern California, the Antilles, from Mexico through Brazil to Northern Argentina and in Peru.

The wingspan is about 44 mm (1.7 in).

The larvae feed on Tradescantia fluminensis and Tradescantia zebrina. They are also capable of being reared on Commelina diffusa.
