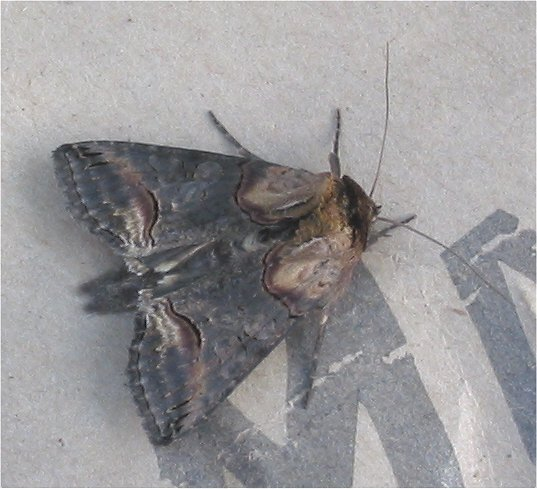

Scientific classification
- Kingdom: Animalia
- Phylum: Arthropoda
- Class: Insecta
- Order: Lepidoptera
- Superfamily: Noctuoidea
- Family: Noctuidae
- Genus: Abrostola
- Species: A. triplasia

Binomial name
- Abrostola triplasia (Linnaeus, 1758)

Synonyms
- Phalaena triplasia; Noctua trigemina

= Abrostola triplasia =

Species of moth

Abrostola triplasia (the dark spectacle) is a moth of the family Noctuidae. It is found across the entire Palearctic realm (Europe (all countries), North Africa, Russia, Siberia, and Japan). Subarctic territories with an average temperature of below 6 °C are an exception. In the warmest and driest regions of the Mediterranean, the Middle East, and the mountains in West and Central Asia, the species occurs only scattered or is entirely lacking.

The wingspan is 32–38 mm.

== Description ==
This is the description from South (1907) "The fore wings of this moth are blackish grey inclining to purplish and rather shining; the basal area is pale reddish brown, edged by a curved dark chocolate brown cross line; a reddish grey band on the outer area clouded with ground colour and edged above the inner margin by a dark chocolate brown curved line; raised scales on the central area and on the cross lines. Two oval reddish brown marks on the front of the collar have some resemblance to a pair of spectacles, hence the English name". The oddly shaped humped caterpillar is green, sprinkled with white dots; on segments 4, 5, and 11 are whitish-edged darker marks, and there is a dark line, also whitish-edged, along the middle of the back between segments 5 and 11. There is a white line on the back from segment 4 to the brownish head, and white-edged dark oblique lines on the sides of segments 6 to 11; the line low down along the sides is whitish with an ochreous tinge. A purplish brown form also occurs, in which the pale markings are ochreous tinged.

== Similar species ==
Abrostola tripartita The spectacle Diagnostic features Abrostola triplasia. The basal area of the forewing whitish grey. The stigmata are outlined in black and there are three parallel streaks at the apex of the wing.

The larvae feed on Urtica dioica, Humulus lupulus and Parietaria.
