= A. innotata =

A. innotata may refer to:

- Acronicta innotata, the unmarked dagger moth or birch dagger, a moth species found Northern America
- Aythya innotata, the Madagascar pochard, an extremely rare diving duck species

== See also ==
- Innotata
