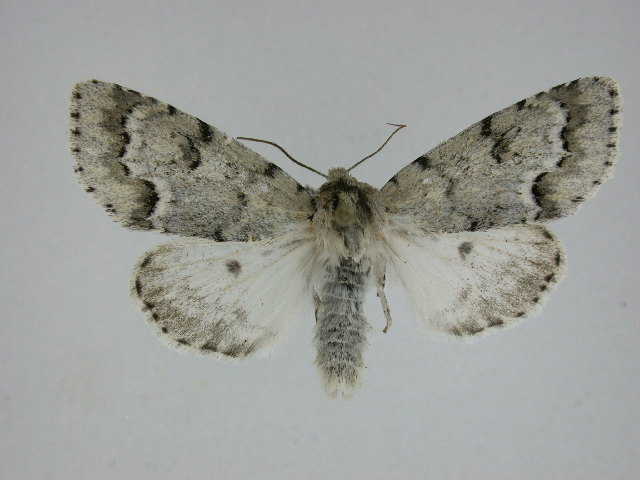

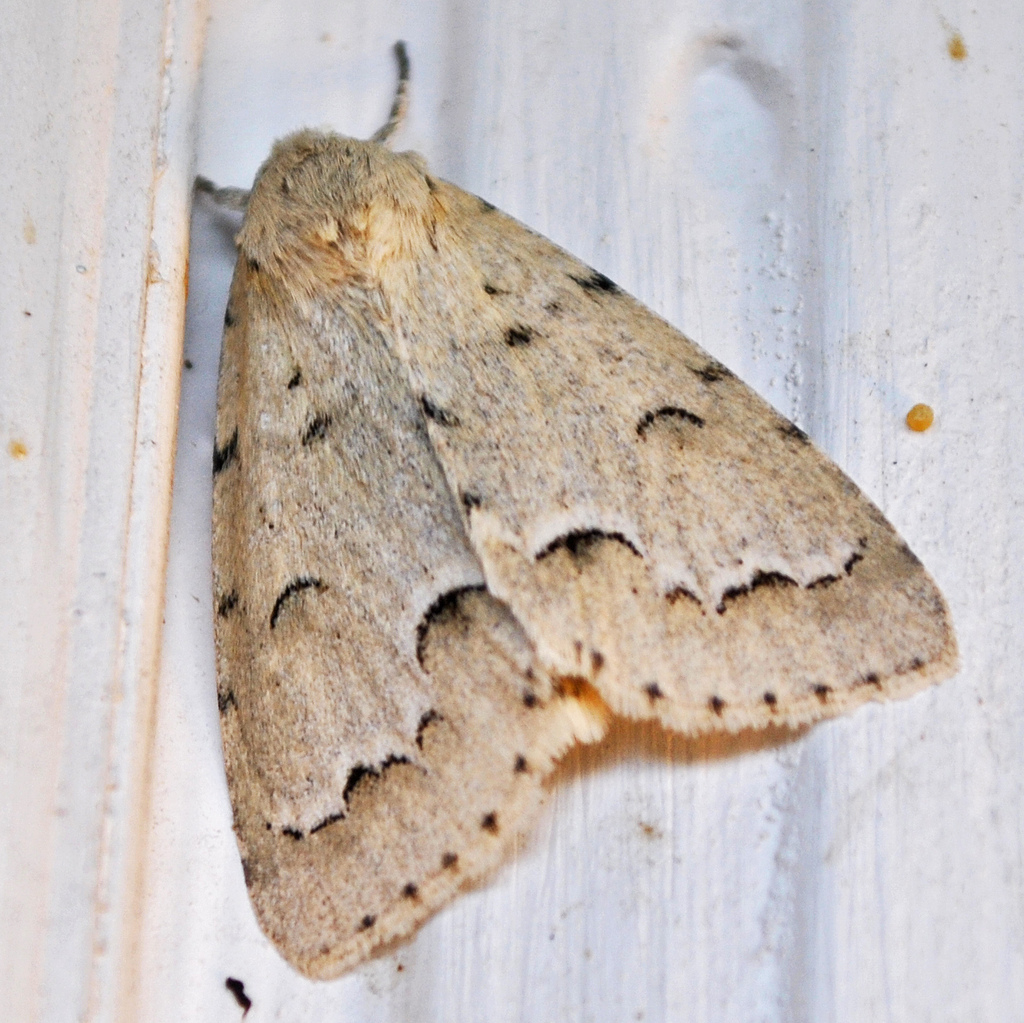

Scientific classification
- Kingdom: Animalia
- Phylum: Arthropoda
- Clade: Pancrustacea
- Class: Insecta
- Order: Lepidoptera
- Superfamily: Noctuoidea
- Family: Noctuidae
- Genus: Acronicta
- Species: A. innotata

Binomial name
- Acronicta innotata Guenée, 1852

Synonyms
- Acronicta graefii; Acronicta griseor

= Acronicta innotata =

Species of moth

Acronicta innotata, the unmarked dagger moth or birch dagger, is a moth of the family Noctuidae. The species was first described by Achille Guenée in 1852. It is found from Newfoundland to British Columbia and adjacent northern states in the United States, south in the east to North Carolina and Kentucky.

The wingspan is 35–40 mm. Adults are on wing from May to August depending on the location.

The larvae feed on the leaves of alder, birch, cherry, hickory, poplar and willow.
