= List of moths of Turkey (Noctuidae) =

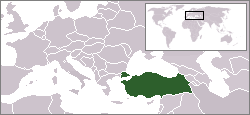
Location of Turkey

This is a list of moths of the family Noctuidae that are found in Turkey. It also acts as an index to the species articles and forms part of the full List of moths of Turkey.

- Abrostola agnorista Dufay, 1956
- Abrostola asclepiadis Lang, 1789
- Abrostola clarissa Staudinger, 1900
- Abrostola trigemina Werneburg, 1864
- Abrostola triplasia (Linnaeus, 1758)
- Acantholeucania loreyi Duponchel, 1827
- Acantholipes regularis (Hübner, [1813])
- Acontia lucida (Hufnagel, 1766)
- Acontia titania (Esper, [1798])
- Acontia urania Frivaldsky, 1835
- Acrapex taurica Staudinger, 1900
- Acronicta aceris (Linnaeus, 1758)
- Acronicta alni (Linnaeus, 1758)
- Acronicta leporina (Linnaeus, 1758)
- Acronicta pasiphae Draudt, 1936
- Acronicta psi (Linnaeus, 1758)
- Acronicta tridens ([Denis & Schiffermüller], 1775)
- Actebia praecox (Linnaeus, 1758)
- Actinotia hypericii (Fabricius, 1787)
- Actinotia polyodon Clerck, 1759
- Actinotia radiosa (Esper, [1804])
- Aedia funesta (Esper, [1786])
- Aedia leucomelas (Linnaeus, 1758)
- Aedophron phlebophora Lederer, 1858
- Aedophron rhodites Eversmann, 1851
- Agrapha accentifera Lefebvre, 1827
- Agrochola pistacina Goeze, 1781
- Agrotis biconica Kollar, 1844
- Agrotis cinerea ([Denis & Schiffermüller], 1775)
- Agrotis clavis (Hufnagel, 1766)
- Agrotis desertorum Boisduval, 1840
- Agrotis exclamationis (Linnaeus, 1758)
- Agrotis grossi Hacker & Kuhna, 1986
- Agrotis haifae Staudinger, 1897
- Agrotis ipsilon (Hufnagel, 1766)
- Agrotis ripae (Hübner, [1813])
- Agrotis scruposa Draudt, 1936
- Agrotis segetum ([Denis & Schiffermüller], 1775)
- Agrotis trux (Hübner, [1824])
- Aletia albipuncta (Fabricius, 1787)
- Aletia alopecuri Boisduval, 1840
- Aletia congrua (Hübner, [1817])
- Aletia conigera ([Denis & Schiffermüller], 1775)
- Aletia deserticola Bartel, 1903
- Aletia ferrago (Fabricius, 1787)
- Aletia flavostigma Bremer, 1861
- Aletia impura (Hübner, [1808])
- Aletia l-album (Linnaeus, 1767)
- Aletia languida Walker, 1858
- Aletia pallens (Linnaeus, 1758)
- Aletia prominens Walker, 1856
- Aletia pudorina ([Denis & Schiffermüller], 1775)
- Aletia sassanidica Hacker, 1986
- Aletia scirpi Duponchel, 1836
- Aletia sicula Treitschke, 1835
- Aletia straminea Treitschke, 1825
- Aletia vitellina (Hübner, [1808])
- Allophyes asiatica Staudinger, 1892
- Allophyes benedictina Staudinger, 1892
- Allophyes metaxys Boursin, 1953
- Allophyes oxyacanthae (Linnaeus, 1758)
- Allophyes renalis Wiltshire, 1941
- Alpichola egorovi Bang-Haas, 1934
- Alpichola janhillmanni Hacker & Moberg, 1989
- Alpichola lactiflora Draudt, 1934
- Amephana dalmatica Rebel, 1919
- Ammoconia caecimacula (Fabricius, 1787)
- Ammoconia senex Geyer, [1828]
- Amphidrina agrotina Staudinger, 1892
- Amphipoea oculea (Linnaeus, 1761)
- Amphipyra berbera Rungs, 1949
- Amphipyra livida ([Denis & Schiffermüller], 1775)
- Amphipyra micans Lederer, 1857
- Amphipyra molybdea Christoph, 1867
- Amphipyra perflua (Fabricius, 1787)
- Amphipyra pyramidea (Linnaeus, 1758)
- Amphipyra stix Herrich-Schäffer, [1850]
- Amphipyra tetra (Fabricius, 1787)
- Amphipyra tragopoginis Clerck, 1759
- Amphipyra turcomana Staudinger, 1888
- Anaplectoides prasina Goeze, 1781
- Anchoscelis deleta Staudinger, 1881
- Anchoscelis gratiosa Staudinger, 1881
- Anchoscelis helvola (Linnaeus, 1758)
- Anchoscelis humilis (Fabricius, 1787)
- Anchoscelis imitata Ronkay, 1984
- Anchoscelis kindermannii F.R., 1838
- Anchoscelis litura (Linnaeus, 1761)
- Anchoscelis lota Clerck, 1759
- Anchoscelis macilenta (Hübner, [1809])
- Anchoscelis nitida (Fabricius, 1787)
- Anchoscelis oropotamica Wiltshire, 1941
- Anchoscelis osthelderi Boursin, 1951
- Anchoscelis rupicapra Staudinger, 1879
- Anchoscelis saitana Derra, 1990
- Aneda rivularis (Fabricius, 1775)
- Anepia esperi Hacker, 1992
- Anepia irregularis (Hufnagel, 1766)
- Anepia musculina Staudinger, 1892
- Anepia neglecta Hacker, 1992
- Anepia pumila Staudinger, 1879
- Anepia wolfi Hacker, 1992
- Anopoma riparia Rambur, 1829
- Antarchaea conicephala Staudinger, 1870
- Antarchaea numisma (Hübner, [1803])
- Antennola impura Mann, 1862
- Antholopha gloriosa Staudinger, 1892
- Antholopha ionodoxa Ronkay, 1990
- Anthracia eriopoda Herrich-Schäffer, [1851]
- Antitype chi (Linnaeus, 1758)
- Antitype chionodes Boursin, 1968
- Antitype jonis Lederer, 1865
- Anua bimaculata Osthelder, 1933
- Anua lunaris Goeze, 1781
- Anumeta arax Fibiger, 1995
- Apamea anceps ([Denis & Schiffermüller], 1775)
- Apamea aquila Donzel, 1837
- Apamea crenata (Hufnagel, 1766)
- Apamea epomidion Haworth, [1809]
- Apamea euxinia Hacker, 1985
- Apamea ferrago Eversmann, 1837
- Apamea furva Goeze, 1781
- Apamea illyria Freyer, 1846
- Apamea indiges Turati, 1926
- Apamea lateritia (Hufnagel, 1766)
- Apamea leucodon Eversmann, 1837
- Apamea lithoxylaea (Fabricius, 1787)
- Apamea maraschi Draudt, 1934
- Apamea monoglypha (Hufnagel, 1766)
- Apamea oblonga Haworth, [1809]
- Apamea platinea Treitschke, 1825
- Apamea pyxina Bang-Haas, 1910
- Apamea remissa (Hübner, [1809])
- Apamea scolopacina (Esper, [1788])
- Apamea sicula Treitschke, 1835
- Apamea sordens (Hufnagel, 1766)
- Apamea sublustris (Esper, [1788])
- Apamea unanimis (Hübner, [1813])
- Apamea zeta Treitschke, 1825
- Apaustis rupicola ([Denis & Schiffermüller], 1775)
- Apaustis theophila Staudinger, 1866
- Apopestes noe Ronkay, 1990
- Apopestes phantasma Eversmann, 1843
- Apopestes spectrum (Esper, [1787])
- Aporophyla australis Boisduval, 1829
- Aporophyla canescens Duponchel, 1826
- Aporophyla lutulenta ([Denis & Schiffermüller], 1775)
- Aporophyla nigra Haworth, [1809]
- Archanara algae (Esper, [1789])
- Archanara geminipuncta Haworth, [1809]
- Archanara sparganii (Esper, [1790])
- Arcyophora dentula Lederer, 1870
- Arenostola semicana (Esper, [1798])
- Argyrospila succinea (Esper, [1798])
- Armada panaceorum Ménétriés, 1849
- Atethmia ambusta (Fabricius, 1787)
- Atethmia centrago Haworth, [1809]
- Atethmia obscura Osthelder, 1933
- Atethmia pinkeri Hacker, [1987]
- Athetis furvula (Hübner, [1808])
- Athetis gluteosa Treitschke, 1835
- Athetis hospes Freyer, 1831
- Athetis pallustris (Hübner, [1808])
- Atypha pulmonaris (Esper, [1790])
- Auchmis detersa (Esper, [1791])
- Autographa aemula ([Denis & Schiffermüller], 1775)
- Autographa gamma (Linnaeus, 1758)
- Autographa jota (Linnaeus, 1758)
- Autographa messmeri Schadewald, 1993
- Autophila asiatica Staudinger, 1888
- Autophila banghaasi Boursin, 1940
- Autophila cerealis Staudinger, 1871
- Autophila depressa Püngeler, 1914
- Autophila dilucida (Hübner, [1808])
- Autophila einsleri Amsel, 1935
- Autophila hirsuta Staudinger, 1870
- Autophila iranica Ronkay, 1989
- Autophila libanotica Staudinger, 1901
- Autophila limbata Staudinger, 1871
- Autophila sinesafida Wiltshire, 1952
- Axylia putris (Linnaeus, 1761)
- Behounekia freyeri Frivaldsky, 1835
- Bena prasinana (Linnaeus, 1758)
- Brachionycha sphinx (Hufnagel, 1766)
- Brachionycha syriaca Warren, 1910
- Brachylomia uralensis Warren, 1910
- Brachylomia viminalis (Fabricius, 1777)
- Brandticola dubiosa Brandt, 1938
- Bryoleuca dolopsis Hampson, 1908
- Bryoleuca labecula Lederer, 1855
- Bryoleuca microphysa Boursin, 1952
- Bryoleuca petrea Guenée, 1852
- Bryoleuca petricolor Lederer, 1870
- Bryoleuca raddei Boursin, 1963
- Bryoleuca raptricula ([Denis & Schiffermüller], 1775)
- Bryoleuca rectilinea Warren, 1909
- Bryoleuca remanei Heydemann & Schulte, 1963
- Bryoleuca seladona Christoph, 1885
- Bryoleuca tephrocharis Boursin, 1953
- Bryomima carducha Staudinger, 1900
- Bryomima defreina Hacker, 1986
- Bryomima hakkariensis Freina, & Hacker, 1985
- Bryomima luteosordida Osthelder, 1933
- Bryophila eucharista Boursin, 1960
- Bryophila maeonis Lederer, 1865
- Bryophila occidentalis Osthelder, 1933
- Bryophilopsis roederi Standfuss, 1892
- Bryopsis amasina Draudt, 1931
- Bryopsis muralis Forster, 1771
- Caeshadena caesia ([Denis & Schiffermüller], 1775)
- Calamia staudingeri Warnecke, 1941
- Calliergis ramosa (Esper, [1786])
- Callistege mi Clerck, 1759
- Callopistria juventina Stoll, [1782]
- Calocucullia celsiae Herrich-Schäffer, [1850]
- Calophasia acuta Freyer, [1838]
- Calophasia barthae Wagner, 1929
- Calophasia lunula (Hufnagel, 1766)
- Calophasia opalina (Esper, [1796])
- Calophasia platyptera (Esper, [1788])
- Calymma communimacula ([Denis & Schiffermüller], 1775)
- Calymnia trapezina (Linnaeus, 1758)
- Calyptra thalictri Borkhausen, 1790
- Caradrina morpheus (Hufnagel, 1766)
- Cardepia arenbergeri Pinker, 1974
- Cardepia hartigi Parenzan, 1981
- Cardepia sociabilis Graslin, 1850
- Catephia alchymista ([Denis & Schiffermüller], 1775)
- Catocala abacta Staudinger, 1900
- Catocala conjuncta (Esper, [1787])
- Catocala conversa (Esper, [1787])
- Catocala dilecta (Hübner, [1808])
- Catocala elocata (Esper, [1787])
- Catocala fraxini (Linnaeus, 1758)
- Catocala hymenaea Goeze, 1781
- Catocala lesbia Christoph, 1887
- Catocala lupina Herrich-Schäffer, [1851]
- Catocala mesopotamica Kuznesov, 1903
- Catocala neonympha (Esper, [1796])
- Catocala nupta (Linnaeus, 1767)
- Catocala nymphagoga (Esper, [1787])
- Catocala promissa Goeze, 1781
- Catocala puerpera Giorna, 1791
- Catocala sponsa (Linnaeus, 1767)
- Ceramica pisi (Linnaeus, 1758)
- Cerapteryx graminis (Linnaeus, 1758)
- Cerapteryx megala Alpheraky, 1882
- Cerastis rubricosa (Fabricius, 1787)
- Cerocala sana Staudinger, 1901
- Charanyca trigrammica (Hufnagel, 1766)
- Chazaria incarnata Freyer, 1838
- Cheirophanes anaphanes Boursin, 1940
- Cheirophanes ligaminosa Eversmann, 1851
- Cheirophanes plattneri Boursin, 1955
- Chersotis adili Koçak, 1987
- Chersotis alpestris Boisduval, 1834
- Chersotis anachoreta Herrich-Schäffer, [1851]
- Chersotis anatolica Draudt, 1936
- Chersotis andereggii Boisduval, 1832
- Chersotis capnistis Lederer, 1872
- Chersotis cuprea ([Denis & Schiffermüller], 1775)
- Chersotis ebertorum Koçak, 1980
- Chersotis elegans Eversmann, 1837
- Chersotis fimbriola (Esper, [1798])
- Chersotis firdussi Schwingenschuss, 1937
- Chersotis friedeli Pinker, 1974
- Chersotis glebosa Staudinger, 1900
- Chersotis gratissima Corti, 1932
- Chersotis illauta Draudt, 1936
- Chersotis juvenis Staudinger, 1901
- Chersotis laeta Rebel, 1904
- Chersotis larixia Guenée, 1852
- Chersotis luperinoides Guenée, 1852
- Chersotis margaritacea Villers, 1789
- Chersotis multangula (Hübner, [1803])
- Chersotis rectangula (Fabricius, 1787)
- Chersotis ronkayorum Fibiger, Hacker & Varga, 1992
- Chersotis sarhada Brandt, 1941
- Chersotis semna Püngeler, 1906
- Chersotis stenographa Varga, 1979
- Chersotis zukowskyi Draudt, 1936
- Chilodes maritimus Tauscher, 1806
- Chionoxantha staudingeri Standfuss, 1892
- Chrysodeixis chalcites (Esper, [1789])
- Cirrhia gilvago ([Denis & Schiffermüller], 1775)
- Cirrhia icteritia (Hufnagel, 1766)
- Cirrhia ocellaris Borkhausen, 1792
- Cleoceris scoriacea (Esper, [1789])
- Cleonymia baetica Rambur, [1837]
- Cleonymia opposita Lederer, 1870
- Clytie distincta Bang-Haas, 1907
- Clytie syriaca Bugnion, 1837
- Clytie terrulenta Christoph, 1893
- Coccidiphaga scitula Rambur, 1833
- Colobochyla platyzona Lederer, 1870
- Colobochyla salicalis ([Denis & Schiffermüller], 1775)
- Colocasia coryli (Linnaeus, 1758)
- Colonsideridis albicolon (Hübner, [1809])
- Conisania capsivora Draudt, 1933
- Conistra acutula Staudinger, 1892
- Conistra asiatica Pinker, 1980
- Conistra erythrocephala (Fabricius, 1787)
- Conistra kasyi Boursin, 1963
- Conistra ligula (Esper, [1791])
- Conistra metria Boursin, 1940
- Conistra rubiginea (Fabricius, 1787)
- Conistra torrida Lederer, 1857
- Conistra vaccinii (Linnaeus, 1761)
- Conistra veronicae (Hübner, [1813])
- Copiphana oliva Staudinger, 1895
- Copiphana olivina Herrich-Schäffer, [1852]
- Cornutiplusia circumflexa (Linnaeus, 1767)
- Cosmia affinis (Linnaeus, 1767)
- Cosmia confinis Herrich-Schäffer, [1849]
- Cosmia diffinis (Linnaeus, 1767)
- Craniophora ligustri (Fabricius, 1787)
- Craniophora pontica Staudinger, 1879
- Crassagrotis crassa (Hübner, [1803])
- Crassagrotis obesa Boisduval, 1829
- Cryphia receptricula (Hübner, [1803])
- Cucullia absinthii (Linnaeus, 1761)
- Cucullia anifurca Goeze, 1781
- Cucullia argentina (Fabricius, 1787)
- Cucullia artemisiae ([Denis & Schiffermüller], 1775)
- Cucullia behouneki Hacker & Ronkay, 1988
- Cucullia boryphora Fischer de Waldheim, 1840
- Cucullia calendulae Treitschke, 1835
- Cucullia chamomillae ([Denis & Schiffermüller], 1775)
- Cucullia citella Ronkay & Ronkay, 1987
- Cucullia dracunculi (Hübner, [1813])
- Cucullia gnaphalii (Hübner, [1813])
- Cucullia lucifuga (Hübner, [1803])
- Cucullia mixta Freyer, 1842
- Cucullia santolinae Rambur, 1834
- Cucullia santonici (Hübner, [1813])
- Cucullia syrtana Mabille, 1888
- Cucullia tanaceti Goeze, 1781
- Cucullia tecca Püngeler, 1906
- Cucullia umbratica (Linnaeus, 1758)
- Cucullia xeranthemi Boisduval, 1840
- Dasymixis diva Ronkay & Varga, 1990
- Dasypolia altissima Hacker & Moberg, 1988
- Dasypolia dichroa Ronkay & Varga, 1985
- Dasypolia ferdinandi Rühl, 1892
- Dasypolia fibigeri Hacker & Moberg, 1988
- Dasypolia templi Thunberg, 1792
- Desertoplusia bella Christoph, 1887
- Desertoplusia colornata Varga & Ronkay, 1991
- Diachrysia chrysitis (Linnaeus, 1758)
- Diachrysia chryson (Esper, [1789])
- Diachrysia tutti Kostrowicki, 1961
- Diachrysia Hübner, [1821]
- Dianthivora implexa (Hübner, [1809])
- Diarsia brunnea Goeze, 1781
- Diarsia florida Schmidt, 1859
- Diarsia mendica (Fabricius, 1775)
- Diarsia rubi Vieweg, 1790
- Dichagyris achtalensis Kozhantshikov, 1929
- Dichagyris amoena Staudinger, 1892
- Dichagyris anastasia Draudt, 1936
- Dichagyris cataleipa Varga, 1993
- Dichagyris celebrata Alpheraky, 1897
- Dichagyris elbursica Draudt, 1937
- Dichagyris eremicola Standfuss, 1888
- Dichagyris erubescens Staudinger, 1892
- Dichagyris eureteocles Boursin, 1940
- Dichagyris forficula Eversmann, 1851
- Dichagyris fredi Brandt, 1938
- Dichagyris griseotincta Wagner, 1931
- Dichagyris grisescens Staudinger, 1879
- Dichagyris leucomelas Brandt, 1941
- Dichagyris melanura Kollar, 1846
- Dichagyris pfeifferi Corti & Draudt, 1933
- Dichagyris psammochroa Boursin, 1940
- Dichagyris renigera (Hübner, [1808])
- Dichagyris singularis Staudinger, 1877
- Dichagyris squalidior Staudinger, 1901
- Dichagyris squalorum Eversmann, 1856
- Dichagyris terminicincta Corti, 1933
- Dichagyris vallesiaca Boisduval, 1832
- Dichagyris wolfi Hacker, 1985
- Dichonia aeruginea (Hübner, [1803])
- Dichonia convergens ([Denis & Schiffermüller], 1775)
- Dichonioxa tenebrosa (Esper, [1789])
- Dichromia munitalis Mann, 1861
- Dicycla oo (Linnaeus, 1758)
- Diloba caeruleocephala (Linnaeus, 1758)
- Discestra baksana Schintlmeister, 1986
- Discestra dianthi Tauscher, 1809
- Discestra furca Eversmann, 1852
- Discestra latemarginata Wiltshire, 1976
- Discestra loeffleri Reisser, 1958
- Discestra mendax Staudinger, 1879
- Discestra mendica Staudinger, 1895
- Discestra stigmosa Christoph, 1887
- Discestra trifolii (Hufnagel, 1766)
- Divaena haywardi Tams, 1926
- Drasteria cailino Lefebvre, 1827
- Drasteria caucasica Kolenati, 1846
- Drasteria flexuosa Ménétriés, 1847
- Drasteria herzi Alpheraky, 1895
- Drasteria picta Christoph, 1877
- Drasteria rada Boisduval, 1848
- Drasteria saisani Staudinger, 1882
- Drasteria sequax Staudinger, 1901
- Drasteria sesquilina Staudinger, 1888
- Dryobota labecula (Esper, [1788])
- Dryobotodes eremita (Fabricius, 1775)
- Dryobotodes servadeii Parenzan, 1982
- Dypterygia scabriuscula (Linnaeus, 1758)
- Dysgonia algira (Linnaeus, 1767)
- Dysgonia torrida Guenée, 1852
- Earias chlorophyllana Staudinger, 1892
- Earias clorana (Linnaeus, 1761)
- Earias insulana Boisduval, 1833
- Earias syriacana Bartel, 1903
- Earias vernana (Fabricius, 1787)
- Ecbolemia misella Püngeler, 1907
- Egira anatolica Hering, 1933
- Egira conspicillaris (Linnaeus, 1758)
- Egira fatima Hreblay, 1994
- Egira tibori Hreblay, 1994
- Eicomorpha antiqua Staudinger, 1888
- Eicomorpha kurdestanica Freina, & Hacker, 1985
- Elaphria venustula (Hübner, 1790)
- Emmelia trabealis Scopoli, 1763
- Enargia paleacea (Esper, [1788])
- Enargia pinkeri Freina, & Hacker, 1985
- Ephesia disjuncta Geyer, [1828]
- Ephesia diversa Geyer, [1828]
- Ephesia eutychea Treitschke, 1835
- Ephesia fulminea Scopoli, 1763
- Ephesia nymphaea (Esper, [1787])
- Epilecta linogrisea ([Denis & Schiffermüller], 1775)
- Epipsilia latens (Hübner, [1809])
- Episema amasina Hampson, 1906
- Episema didymogramma Boursin, 1955
- Episema glaucina (Esper, [1789])
- Episema korsakovi Christoph, 1885
- Episema lederi Christoph, 1885
- Episema tersa ([Denis & Schiffermüller], 1775)
- Eremobia ochroleuca ([Denis & Schiffermüller], 1775)
- Eremodrina agenjoi Boursin, 1936
- Eremodrina avis Pinker, 1980
- Eremodrina belucha Swinhoe, 1885
- Eremodrina bodenheimeri Draudt, 1934
- Eremodrina draudti Boursin, 1936
- Eremodrina gilva Donzel, 1837
- Eremodrina inumbrata Staudinger, 1900
- Eremodrina inumbratella Pinker, 1980
- Eremodrina pertinax Staudinger, 1879
- Eremodrina salzi Boursin, 1936
- Eremodrina vicina Staudinger, 1870
- Eremodrina zernyi Boursin, 1936
- Eremophysa apotheina Brandt, 1938
- Eremophysa discordans Boursin, 1940
- Eriopygodes imbecilla (Fabricius, 1794)
- Eublemma albivestalis Hampson, 1910
- Eublemma caelestis Brandt, 1938
- Eublemma candidana (Fabricius, 1794)
- Eublemma chlorotica Lederer, 1858
- Eublemma cochylioides Guenée, 1852
- Eublemma gratissima Staudinger, 1892
- Eublemma hansa Herrich-Schäffer, [1851]
- Eublemma minutata (Fabricius, 1794)
- Eublemma ochreola Staudinger, 1900
- Eublemma ostrina (Hübner, [1808])
- Eublemma pallidula Herrich-Schäffer, 1856
- Eublemma panonica Freyer, 1840
- Eublemma parallela Freyer, 1842
- Eublemma parva (Hübner, [1808])
- Eublemma polygramma Duponchel, 1836
- Eublemma purpurina ([Denis & Schiffermüller], 1775)
- Eublemma pusilla Eversmann, 1837
- Eublemma ragusana Freyer, 1844
- Eublemma respersa (Hübner, 1790)
- Eublemma rosina (Hübner, [1803])
- Eublemma siticulosa Lederer, 1858
- Eublemma straminea Staudinger, 1892
- Eublemma substrigula Staudinger, 1892
- Eublemma suppuncta Staudinger, 1892
- Eublemma suppura Staudinger, 1892
- Eublemma transmittens Christoph, 1893
- Eublemma viridula Guenée, 1841
- Eublemma wagneri Herrich-Schäffer, 1851
- Euchalcia annemaria Freina, & Hacker, 1985
- Euchalcia armeniae Dufay, 1966
- Euchalcia augusta Staudinger, 1892
- Euchalcia biezanskoi Alberti, 1965
- Euchalcia cuprescens Dufay, 1966
- Euchalcia dorsiflava Standfuss, 1892
- Euchalcia emichi Rogenhofer, 1873
- Euchalcia hedeja Dufay, 1978
- Euchalcia kautti Hacker, 1992
- Euchalcia kitchingi Hacker & Ronkay, 1992
- Euchalcia maria Staudinger, 1892
- Euchalcia paulina Staudinger, 1892
- Euchalcia siderifera Eversmann, 1846
- Euchalcia taurica Osthelder, 1933
- Euchalcia variabilis Piller & Mitterbacher, 1783
- Euchalcia viridis Staudinger, 1901
- Euclidia glyphica (Linnaeus, 1758)
- Eugnorisma chaldaica Boisduval, 1840
- Eugnorisma eminens Lederer, 1855
- Eugnorisma enargialis Draudt, 1936
- Eugnorisma insignata Lederer, 1853
- Eugnorisma kurdistana Hacker et al., 1986
- Eugnorisma leuconeura Hampson, 1918
- Eugnorisma semiramis Boursin, 1940
- Euplexia lucipara (Linnaeus, 1758)
- Eupsilia transversa (Hufnagel, 1766)
- Eurois occulta (Linnaeus, 1758)
- Euschesis interjecta (Hübner, [1803])
- Euschesis janthina ([Denis & Schiffermüller], 1775)
- Euschesis tertia Mentzer Moberg & Fibiger, 1991
- Eutelia adoratrix Staudinger, 1892
- Eutelia adulatrix (Hübner, [1813])
- Euthales algae (Fabricius, 1775)
- Euthales ochsi Boursin, 1941
- Euxoa adjemi Brandt, 1941
- Euxoa agricola Boisduval, 1829
- Euxoa anaemica Draudt, 1936
- Euxoa anatolica Draudt, 1936
- Euxoa aquilina ([Denis & Schiffermüller], 1775)
- Euxoa basigramma Staudinger, 1870
- Euxoa birivia ([Denis & Schiffermüller], 1775)
- Euxoa christophi Staudinger, 1870
- Euxoa conifera Christoph, 1877
- Euxoa cos (Hübner, [1824])
- Euxoa deserta Staudinger, 1870
- Euxoa difficillima Draudt, 1937
- Euxoa distinguenda Lederer, 1857
- Euxoa emolliens Warren, 1909
- Euxoa enitens Corti, 1926
- Euxoa friedeli Pinker, 1980
- Euxoa glabella Wagner, 1930
- Euxoa hastifera Donzel, 1847
- Euxoa heringi Christoph, 1877
- Euxoa hilaris Freyer, 1838
- Euxoa homicida Staudinger, 1900
- Euxoa inclusa Corti, 1931
- Euxoa lidia Cramer, [1782]
- Euxoa luteomixta Wagner, 1932
- Euxoa mobergi Fibiger, 1990
- Euxoa mustelina Christoph, 1877
- Euxoa nigricans (Linnaeus, 1761)
- Euxoa obelisca ([Denis & Schiffermüller], 1775)
- Euxoa ochrogaster Guenée, 1852
- Euxoa perierga Brandt, 1938
- Euxoa recussa (Hübner, [1817])
- Euxoa robiginosa Staudinger, 1895
- Euxoa rubrior Pinker, 1980
- Euxoa scurrilis Draudt, 1937
- Euxoa segnilis Duponchel, 1836
- Euxoa subdecora Hampson, 1903
- Euxoa sulcifera Christoph, 1893
- Euxoa temera (Hübner, [1808])
- Euxoa tritici (Linnaeus, 1758)
- Euxoa vanensis Draudt, 1937
- Euxoa vitta (Esper, [1789])
- Euxoa waltharii Corti, 1931
- Euxoa zernyi Boursin, 1944
- Evisa schawerdae Reisser, 1930
- Exophila rectangularis (Hübner, [1828])
- Frivaldskyola mansueta Herrich-Schäffer, [1850]
- Gonospileia munita (Hübner, [1813])
- Gonospileia triquetra ([Denis & Schiffermüller], 1775)
- Gortyna cervago Eversmann, 1844
- Gortyna flavago (Esper, [1791])
- Gortyna hethitica Hacker et al., 1986
- Gortyna moesiaca Herrich-Schäffer, [1849]
- Gortyna osmana Hacker et al., 1986
- Grammodes bifasciata Petagna, 1788
- Griposia aprilina (Linnaeus, 1758)
- Griposia pinkeri Kobes, 1973
- Grisyigoga candelisequa ([Denis & Schiffermüller], 1775)
- Guselderia mitis Püngeler, 1906
- Hada nana (Hufnagel, 1766)
- Hada persa Alpheraky, 1897
- Hadena armeriae Guenée, 1852
- Hadena bicruris (Hufnagel, 1766)
- Hadena canescens Brandt, 1947
- Hadena cavalla Pinker, 1980
- Hadena defreinai Hacker et al., 1986
- Hadena drenowskii Rebel, 1930
- Hadena gueneei Staudinger, 1901
- Hadena literata Fischer de Waldheim, 1840
- Hadena luteocincta Rambur, 1834
- Hadena melanochroa Staudinger, 1892
- Hadena pfeifferi Draudt, 1934
- Hadena pseudodealbata Freina, & Hacker, 1985
- Hadena pseudohyrcana Freina, & Hacker, 1985
- Hadena staudingeri Wagner, 1931
- Hadena stenoptera Rebel, 1933
- Hadena vulcanica Turati, 1907
- Hadjina lutosa Staudinger, 1892
- Haemerosia renalis (Hübner, [1813])
- Haemerosia vassilininei Bang-Haas, 1912
- Hakkaria varga Hacker, [1987]
- Hecatera bicolorata (Hufnagel, 1766)
- Hecatera cappa (Hübner, [1809])
- Hecatera rhodocharis Brandt, 1938
- Hecatera spinaciae Vieweg, 1790
- Helicoverpa armigera (Hübner, [1808])
- Heliophobus reticulata Goeze, 1781
- Heliophobus texturata Alpheraky, 1892
- Heliothis maritima Graslin, 1855
- Heliothis nubigera Herrich-Schäffer, [1851]
- Heliothis ononis (Fabricius, 1787)
- Heliothis peltigera ([Denis & Schiffermüller], 1775)
- Heliothis viriplaca (Hufnagel, 1766)
- Herminia grisealis ([Denis & Schiffermüller], 1775)
- Herminia nigricaria Osthelder, 1933
- Herminia proxima Christoph, 1893
- Herminia tarsicrinalis Knoch, 1782
- Herminia tarsipennalis Treitschke, 1835
- Herminia tenuialis Rebel, 1899
- Heteropalpia vetusta Walker, 1865
- Heterophysa dumetorum Geyer, [1834]
- Himalistra tahiricola Ronkay & Hreblay, 1994
- Hoplodrina ambigua ([Denis & Schiffermüller], 1775)
- Hoplodrina blanda ([Denis & Schiffermüller], 1775)
- Hoplodrina levis Staudinger, 1888
- Hoplodrina octogenaria Goeze, 1781
- Hoplodrina pfeifferi Boursin, 1932
- Hoplodrina respersa ([Denis & Schiffermüller], 1775)
- Hoplodrina superstes Ochsenheimer, 1816
- Hoplotarache sordescens Staudinger, 1895
- Hypena amica Butler, 1878
- Hypena obesalis Treitschke, 1829
- Hypena obsitalis (Hübner, [1813])
- Hypena palpalis (Hübner, 1796)
- Hypena proboscidalis (Linnaeus, 1758)
- Hypena rostralis (Linnaeus, 1758)
- Hypenodes anatolica Schwingenschuss, 1938
- Hypenodes kalchbergi Staudinger, 1876
- Hypenodes orientalis Staudinger, 1901
- Hypeuthina fulgurita Lederer, 1855
- Hyppa rectilinea (Esper, [1788])
- Hyssia cavernosa Eversmann, 1852
- Idia calvaria ([Denis & Schiffermüller], 1775)
- Ipimorpha retusa (Linnaeus, 1761)
- Ipimorpha subtusa (Fabricius, 1787)
- Iranada tarachoides Bytinski-Salz & Brandt, 1937
- Janthinea divalis Staudinger, 1892
- Janthinea frivaldszkii Duponchel, 1835
- Jodia croceago (Fabricius, 1787)
- Lacanobia blenna (Hübner, [1824])
- Lacanobia dissimilis Knoch, 1781
- Lacanobia histrio Goeze, 1781
- Lacanobia oleracea (Linnaeus, 1758)
- Lacanobia praedita (Hübner, [1813])
- Lacanobia thalassina (Hufnagel, 1766)
- Lacanobia w-latinum (Hufnagel, 1766)
- Lampra fimbriata Schreber, 1759
- Lampra tirennica Biebinger, 1983
- Lamprosticta culta Goeze, 1781
- Lasionycta draudti Wagner, 1936
- Lasionycta proxima (Hübner, [1809])
- Laspeyria flexula ([Denis & Schiffermüller], 1775)
- Latanoctua orbona (Hufnagel, 1766)
- Ledereragrotis multifida Lederer, 1870
- Leucania comma (Linnaeus, 1761)
- Leucania herrichi Herrich-Schäffer, [1849]
- Leucania obsoleta (Hübner, [1803])
- Leucania palaestinae Staudinger, 1897
- Leucania punctosa Treitschke, 1825
- Leucania putrescens (Hübner, [1824])
- Leucania zeae Duponchel, 1827
- Leucochlaena hirsutus Staudinger, 1892
- Leucochlaena hoerhammeri Wagner, 1931
- Leucochlaena jordana Draudt, 1934
- Leucochlaena muscosa Staudinger, 1892
- Leucochlaena rosinae Bohatsch, 1908
- Lithophane hepatica Clerck, 1759
- Lithophane lapidea (Hübner, [1808])
- Lithophane ledereri Staudinger, 1892
- Lithophane merckii Rambur, 1832
- Lithophane ornitopus (Hufnagel, 1766)
- Lithophane semibrunnea Haworth, [1809]
- Lophoterges hoerhammeri Wagner, 1931
- Luperina diversa Staudinger, 1892
- Luperina dumerilii Duponchel, 1826
- Luperina koshantschikovi Püngeler, 1914
- Luperina rjabovi Kljutschko, 1967
- Luperina rubella Duponchel, 1835
- Luperina testacea ([Denis & Schiffermüller], 1775)
- Luteohadena luteago ([Denis & Schiffermüller], 1775)
- Lygephila craccae (Fabricius, 1787)
- Lygephila ludicra (Hübner, 1790)
- Lygephila lusoria (Linnaeus, 1758)
- Lygephila pallida Bang-Haas, 1907
- Lygephila pastinum Treitschke, 1826
- Lygephila procax (Hübner, [1813])
- Lygephila schachti Behounek & Hacker, 1986
- Lygephila viciae (Hübner, [1822])
- Macdunnoughia confusa Stephens, 1850
- Maghadena magnolii Boisduval, 1828
- Mamestra brassicae (Linnaeus, 1758)
- Maraschia grisescens Osthelder, 1933
- Margelana flavidior Wagner, 1931
- Margelana versicolor Staudinger, 1888
- Megalodes eximia Freyer, 1845
- Meganephria bimaculosa (Linnaeus, 1767)
- Meganola albula (Hübner, 1793)
- Meganola asperalis Villers, 1789
- Meganola togatulalis (Hübner, 1796)
- Melanchra persicariae (Linnaeus, 1761)
- Mesapamea didyma (Esper, [1788])
- Mesapamea secalis (Linnaeus, 1758)
- Mesogona acetosellae Goeze, 1781
- Mesogona oxalina (Hübner, [1803])
- Mesoligia furuncula ([Denis & Schiffermüller], 1775)
- Mesoligia literosa Haworth, [1809]
- Metachrostis dardouini Boisduval, 1840
- Metachrostis sefidi Brandt, 1938
- Metachrostis velocior Staudinger, 1892
- Metachrostis velox (Hübner, [1813])
- Metaegle diatemna Boursin, 1962
- Metaegle exquisita Boursin, 1969
- Metaegle gratiosa Staudinger, 1892
- Metaegle kaekeritziana (Hübner, [1799])
- Metaegle nubila Staudinger, 1892
- Metaegle ottoi Schawerda, 1923
- Metaegle pallida Staudinger, 1892
- Metaegle vespertalis (Hübner, [1813])
- Metagnorisma depuncta (Linnaeus, 1761)
- Metagnorisma heuristica Varga & Ronkay, 1987
- Metagnorisma pontica Staudinger, 1892
- Metagnorisma rafidain Boursin, 1936
- Metalopha liturata Christoph, 1887
- Methorasa latreillei Duponchel, 1827
- Metopoceras beata Staudinger, 1892
- Metopoceras delicata Staudinger, 1898
- Metopoceras omar Oberthür, 1887
- Metopodicha ernesti Draudt, 1936
- Metoponrhis albirena Christoph, 1887
- Metopoplus boursini Brandt, 1938
- Metopoplus excelsa Christoph, 1885
- Micriantha decorata Frivaldsky, 1845
- Miselia albimacula Borkhausen, 1792
- Miselia clara Staudinger, 1901
- Miselia compta ([Denis & Schiffermüller], 1775)
- Miselia confusa (Hufnagel, 1766)
- Miselia filograna (Esper, [1788])
- Mniotype adusta (Esper, [1790])
- Mniotype crinomima Wiltshire, 1946
- Mniotype rjabovi Boursin, 1944
- Moma alpium Osbeck, 1778
- Monobotodes monochroma (Esper, [1790])
- Mormo maura (Linnaeus, 1758)
- Mythimna noacki Boursin, 1967
- Myxinia atossa Wiltshire, 1941
- Myxinia chrysographa Wagner, 1931
- Myxinia perchrysa Hacker & Ronkay, 1992
- Myxinia philippsi Püngeler, 1911
- Myxinia rufocincta Geyer, [1828]
- Naenia typica (Linnaeus, 1758)
- Netrocerocora quadrangula Eversmann, 1844
- Nezonycta obtusa Varga & Ronkay, 1991
- Nezonycta pusilla Püngeler, 1900
- Noctua pronuba (Linnaeus, 1758)
- Nodaria nodosalis Herrich-Schäffer, [1851]
- Nola carelica Tengström, 1869
- Nola chlamytulalis (Hübner, [1813])
- Nola cicatricalis Treitschke, 1835
- Nola cucullatella (Linnaeus, 1758)
- Nola gigantula Staudinger, 1879
- Nola harouni Wiltshire, 1951
- Nola subchlamydula Staudinger, 1870
- Nola taurica Daniel, 1935
- Nonargia typhae Thunberg, 1784
- Nycteola asiatica Krulikovsky, 1904
- Nycteola columbana Turner, 1925
- Nycteola eremostola Dufay, 1961
- Nycteola revayana Scopoli, 1772
- Nycteola siculana Fuchs, 1899
- Ochropleura leucogaster Freyer, 1831
- Ochropleura plecta (Linnaeus, 1761)
- Odice arcuinna (Hübner, 1790)
- Odice kuelekana Staudinger, 1871
- Odice suava (Hübner, [1813])
- Oligia latruncula ([Denis & Schiffermüller], 1775)
- Oligia strigilis (Linnaeus, 1758)
- Omphalophana anatolica Lederer, 1857
- Omphalophana antirrhinii (Hübner, [1803])
- Omphalophana durnalayana Osthelder, 1933
- Omphalophana pauli Staudinger, 1892
- Oncocnemis arenbergeri Hacker & Lödl, 1989
- Oncocnemis confusa Freyer, 1842
- Oncocnemis fuscopicta Wiltshire, 1976
- Oncocnemis iranica Schwingenschuss, 1937
- Oncocnemis nigricula Eversmann, 1847
- Oncocnemis strioligera Lederer, 1853
- Ophiuche lividalis (Hübner, 1790)
- Ophiusa tirhaca Cramer, [1777]
- Opigena polygona (Fabricius, 1787)
- Orectis proboscidalis Herrich-Schäffer, [1851]
- Oria musculosa (Hübner, [1808])
- Orrhodiella chaijami Hacker & Weigert, 1986
- Orrhodiella ragusae Failla-Tedaldi, 1890
- Orthosia cerasi (Fabricius, 1775)
- Orthosia dalmatica Wagner, 1909
- Orthosia gothica (Linnaeus, 1758)
- Orthosia gracilis (Fabricius, 1787)
- Orthosia incerta (Hufnagel, 1766)
- Orthosia populeti (Fabricius, 1781)
- Orthosia pulverulenta (Esper, [1786])
- Orthosia rorida Frivaldsky, 1835
- Orthosia rubricosa (Esper, [1786])
- Orthosia schmidtii Dioszeghy, 1935
- Orthosia wolfi Hacker, 1988
- Ostheldera arne Ronkay & Varga, 1994
- Ostheldera gracilis Osthelder, 1933
- Oxytrypia orbiculosa (Esper, [1799])
- Oxytrypia stephania Sutton, [1964]
- Ozarba lascivalis Lederer, 1855
- Ozarba moldavicola Herrich-Schäffer, [1851]
- Pachetra sagittigera (Hufnagel, 1766)
- Pachyagrotis ankarensis Rebel, 1931
- Pachyagrotis benigna Corti, 1926
- Pachyagrotis tischendorfi Püngeler, 1915
- Pachyagrotis wichgrafi Corti & Draudt, 1933
- Palaeographa interrogationis (Linnaeus, 1758)
- Panchrysia deaurata (Esper, [1787])
- Panolis flammea ([Denis & Schiffermüller], 1775)
- Panthea coenobita (Esper, [1785])
- Papestra biren Goeze, 1781
- Paracolax tristalis (Fabricius, 1794)
- Paradrina atriluna Guenée, 1852
- Paradrina boursini Wagner, 1936
- Paradrina cilicia Hacker, 1992
- Paradrina clavipalpis Scopoli, 1763
- Paradrina flavirena Guenée, 1852
- Paradrina muricolor Boursin, 1933
- Paradrina poecila Boursin, 1939
- Paradrina scotoptera Püngeler, 1914
- Paradrina selini Boisduval, 1840
- Paradrina wullschlegeli Püngeler, 1902
- Paraegle ochracea Erschoff, 1874
- Paraegle subochracea Staudinger, 1892
- Paranoctua comes (Hübner, [1813])
- Paranoctua interposita (Hübner, 1790)
- Paranoctua warreni Lödl, 1987
- Paraperplexia silenes (Hübner, [1822])
- Parascotia detersa Staudinger, 1892
- Parascotia fuliginaria (Linnaeus, 1761)
- Parascotia robiginosa Staudinger, 1892
- Parastichtis corticea (Esper, [1800])
- Parastichtis suspecta (Hübner, [1817])
- Pardoxia graellsi Feisthamel, 1837
- Parexarnis ala Staudinger, 1881
- Parexarnis damnata Draudt, 1937
- Parexarnis figulina Draudt, 1936
- Parexarnis pseudosollers Boursin, 1940
- Parexarnis taurica Staudinger, 1879
- Pericyma albidentaria Freyer, 1842
- Pericyma squalens Lederer, 1855
- Peridroma saucia (Hübner, [1808])
- Perigrapha cilissa Püngeler, 1917
- Perigrapha i-cinctum ([Denis & Schiffermüller], 1775)
- Periphanes delphinii (Linnaeus, 1758)
- Periphanes treitschkii Frivaldsky, 1835
- Periphanes victorina Sodoffsky, 1849
- Perplexhadena perplexa ([Denis & Schiffermüller], 1775)
- Perplexhadena syriaca Osthelder, 1933
- Phleboeis sureyae Rebel, 1931
- Phlogophora meticulosa (Linnaeus, 1758)
- Phlogophora scita (Hübner, 1790)
- Photedes apameaoides Hacker 1989
- Photedes captiuncula Treitschke, 1825
- Photedes fluxa (Hübner, [1809])
- Phyllophila melacheila Staudinger, 1896
- Phyllophila obliterata Rambur, 1833
- Phytometra viridaria Clerck, 1759
- Pinkericola cappadocia Hacker, 1987
- Pinkericola inexpectata Varga, 1979
- Pinkericola pygmaea Boursin, 1962
- Pinkericola tephroleuca Boisduval, 1833
- Platyperigea albina Eversmann, 1848
- Platyperigea aspera Rambur, 1834
- Platyperigea cinerascens Tengström, 1870
- Platyperigea kadenii Freyer, 1836
- Platyperigea rjabovi Boursin, 1936
- Platyperigea syriaca Staudinger, 1892
- Platyperigea terrea Freyer, [1840]
- Platysenta viscosa Freyer, 1831
- Plecoptera amanica Osthelder, 1933
- Plecoptera inquinata Lederer, 1857
- Plusia festucae (Linnaeus, 1758)
- Plusidia cheiranthi Tauscher, 1809
- Polia bombycina (Hufnagel, 1766)
- Polia nebulosa (Hufnagel, 1766)
- Polia serratilinea Ochsenheimer, 1816
- Polia tincta Brahm, 1791
- Polymixis bischoffi Herrich-Schäffer, [1850]
- Polymixis manisadjiani Staudinger, 1881
- Polymixis paradisiaca Boursin, 1944
- Polymixis paravarga Ronkay et al., 1990
- Polymixis polymita (Linnaeus, 1761)
- Polyphaenis monophaenis Brandt, 1938
- Polyphaenis propinqua Staudinger, 1895
- Polyphaenis subsericata Herrich-Schäffer, 1861
- Polyphaenis viridis Villers, 1789
- Polypogon lunalis Scopoli, 1763
- Polypogon plumigeralis (Hübner, [1825])
- Polypogon strigilata (Linnaeus, 1758)
- Polypogon tentacularia (Linnaeus, 1758)
- Polypogon zelleralis Wocke, 1850
- Powellinia lasserei Oberthür, 1881
- Praestilbia armeniaca Staudinger, 1892
- Prodotis stolida (Fabricius, 1775)
- Propenistra laevis (Hübner, [1803])
- Protexarnis confinis Staudinger, 1881
- Protexarnis opisoleuca Staudinger, 1881
- Protexarnis squalidiformis Corti & Draudt, 1933
- Protodeltote pyrarga (Hufnagel, 1766)
- Protoschinia scutosa Goeze, 1781
- Protoschinia umbra (Hufnagel, 1766)
- Pseudaletia unipuncta Haworth, [1809]
- Pseudenargia deleta Osthelder, 1933
- Pseudenargia regina Staudinger, 1892
- Pseudeustrotia candidula ([Denis & Schiffermüller], 1775)
- Pseudeustrotia deceptoria Scopoli, 1763
- Pseudochropleura flammatra ([Denis & Schiffermüller], 1775)
- Pseudochropleura musiva (Hübner, [1803])
- Pseudohadena chenopodiphaga Rambur, 1832
- Pseudohadena commoda Staudinger, 1889
- Pseudohadena impedita Christoph, 1887
- Pseudohadena laciniosa Christoph, 1887
- Pseudoips fagana (Fabricius, 1781)
- Pseudomniotype leuconota H.-Schäffer, [1850]
- Pseudomniotype solieri Boisduval, 1840
- Pseudozarba bipartita Herrich-Schäffer, [1850]
- Putagrotis herzogi Rebel, 1911
- Putagrotis puta (Hübner, [1803])
- Putagrotis syricola Berio, 1936
- Pyrocleptria cora Eversmann, 1837
- Pyrois cinnamomea Goeze, 1781
- Pyrois effusa Boisduval, 1829
- Rasihia boursini Draudt, 1936
- Rasihia duelduelica Osthelder, 1932
- Rasihia hackeri Varga & Ronkay, 1991
- Rasihia tabora Staudinger, 1892
- Resapamea hedeni Graeser, 1888
- Resapamea vaskeni Varga, 1979
- Rhizedra lutosa (Hübner, [1803])
- Rhyacia arenacea Hampson, 1907
- Rhyacia helvetina Boisduval, 1833
- Rhyacia lucipeta ([Denis & Schiffermüller], 1775)
- Rhyacia nyctymerides Bang-Haas, 1922
- Rhyacia simulans (Hufnagel, 1766)
- Rhynchodontodes antiqualis (Hübner, [1809])
- Rhynchodontodes mardinalis Staudinger, 1892
- Rhynchodontodes ravalis Herrich-Schäffer, [1852]
- Rhynchodontodes revolutalis Zeller, 1852
- Rhypagla lacernaria (Hübner, [1813])
- Rileyana fovea Treitschke, 1825
- Rivula sericealis Scopoli, 1763
- Rivula tanitalis Rebel, 1912
- Roborbotodes carbonis Wagner, 1931
- Rusina ferruginea (Esper, [1785])
- Saragossa siccanorum Staudinger, 1870
- Schinia cardui (Hübner, 1790)
- Schinia cognata Freyer, [1833]
- Schinia imperialis Staudinger, 1871
- Schinia purpurascens Tauscher, 1809
- Schrankia costaestrigalis Stephens, 1834
- Schrankia taenialis (Hübner, [1809])
- Scoliopteryx libatrix (Linnaeus, 1758)
- Scotochrosta pulla Illiger, 1801
- Serpmyxis serpentina Treitschke, 1825
- Sesamia cretica Lederer, 1857
- Sesamia lacteola Christoph, 1893
- Sesamia nonagrioides Lefebvre, 1827
- Shargacucullia anceps Staudinger, 1881
- Shargacucullia armena Ronkay & Ronkay, 1986
- Shargacucullia barthae Boursin, 1933
- Shargacucullia blattariae (Esper, [1790])
- Shargacucullia lychnitis Rambur, 1833
- Shargacucullia osthelderi Boursin, 1933
- Shargacucullia prenanthis Boisduval, 1840
- Shargacucullia scrophulariae ([Denis & Schiffermüller], 1775)
- Shargacucullia thapsiphaga Treitschke, 1826
- Shargacucullia verbasci (Linnaeus, 1758)
- Sideridis egena Lederer, 1853
- Sideridis lampra Schawerda, 1913
- Simplicia rectalis Eversmann, 1842
- Simyra albovenosa Goeze, 1781
- Simyra dentinosa Freyer, 1839
- Simyra nervosa ([Denis & Schiffermüller], 1775)
- Simyra renimaculata Osthelder, 1932
- Spaelotis degeniata Christoph, 1877
- Spaelotis demavendi Wagner, 1937
- Spaelotis ravida ([Denis & Schiffermüller], 1775)
- Spaelotis senna Freyer, 1829
- Spodoptera abyssinia Guenée, 1852
- Spodoptera exigua (Hübner, [1808])
- Spodoptera littoralis Boisduval, 1833
- Spudaea pontica Kljutshko, 1968
- Standfussiana defessa Lederer, 1858
- Standfussiana lucernea (Linnaeus, 1758)
- Standfussiana nictymera Boisduval, 1934
- Stenodrina aeschista Boursin, 1937
- Stenoecia dos Freyer, [1838]
- Stilbina hypaenides Staudinger, 1892
- Subacronicta megacephala (Fabricius, 1787)
- Sunira circellaris (Hufnagel, 1766)
- Tarachephia hueberi Erschoff, 1874
- Tathorhynchus excissata Lederer, 1855
- Thalerastria diaphora Staudinger, 1879
- Thalpophila matura (Hufnagel, 1766)
- Tholera cespitis Goeze, 1781
- Tholera decimalis (Poda, 1761)
- Tholera hilaris Staudinger, 1901
- Thria robusta Walker, [1858]
- Thysanoplusia daubei Boisduval, 1840
- Thysanoplusia orichalcea (Fabricius, 1775)
- Tiliacea aurago ([Denis & Schiffermüller], 1775)
- Tiliacea cypreago Hampson, 1906
- Tiliacea fulvago Clerck, 1759
- Trachea atriplicis (Linnaeus, 1758)
- Trichoplusia circumscripta Freyer, 1831
- Trichoplusia ni (Hübner, [1803])
- Tristateles emortualis ([Denis & Schiffermüller], 1775)
- Tyta luctuosa ([Denis & Schiffermüller], 1775)
- Ulochlaena hirta (Hübner, [1813])
- Valeria oleagina (Esper, [1786])
- Valerietta boursini Freina, & Hacker, 1985
- Valerietta niphopasta Hampson, 1906
- Victrix artaxias Varga & Ronkay, 1989
- Victrix gracilis Wagner, 1931
- Victrix karsiana Staudinger, 1879
- Victrix pinkeri Hacker & Lödl, 1989
- Viminia auricoma (Fabricius, 1787)
- Viminia euphorbiae Denis, 1785
- Viminia orientalis Mann, 1862
- Viminia rumicis (Linnaeus, 1758)
- Xanthia togata (Esper, [1788])
- Xanthodes albago (Fabricius, 1794)
- Xanthothrix callicore Staudinger, 1871
- Xenophysa huberi Varga, 1989
- Xestia ashworthii Doubleday, 1855
- Xestia baja Schrank, 1784
- Xestia castanea (Esper, [1798])
- Xestia c-nigrum (Linnaeus, 1758)
- Xestia cohaesa Herrich-Schäffer, [1849]
- Xestia ditrapezium (Fabricius, 1787)
- Xestia miniago Freyer, 1840
- Xestia ochreago (Hübner, [1809])
- Xestia palaestinensis Kalchberg, 1897
- Xestia pallidago Staudinger, 1900
- Xestia rhomboidea (Esper, [1790])
- Xestia sareptana Herrich-Schäffer, [1851]
- Xestia triangulum (Hufnagel, 1766)
- Xestia trifida Fischer v.Waldheim, 1820
- Xestia xanthographa ([Denis & Schiffermüller], 1775)
- Xylena exsoleta (Linnaeus, 1758)
- Xylena lunifera Warren, 1910
- Xylena vetusta (Hübner, [1813])
- Xylocampa mustapha Oberthür, 1919
- Yigoga amasicola Koçak, 1980
- Yigoga celsicola Bellier, 1858
- Yigoga flavina Herrich-Schäffer, [1852]
- Yigoga forcipula ([Denis & Schiffermüller], 1775)
- Yigoga gracilis Wagner, 1929
- Yigoga hackeri Fibiger, 1992
- Yigoga latipennis Püngeler, 1909
- Yigoga libanicola Corti & Draudt, 1933
- Yigoga nachadira Brandt, 1941
- Yigoga nigrescens Höfner, 1888
- Yigoga occidentalis Hacker, [1987]
- Yigoga orientis Alpheraky, 1882
- Yigoga romanovi Christoph, 1885
- Yigoga serraticornis Staudinger, 1898
- Yigoga signifera Schrank, 1782
- Yigoga stigmatula Kozhantshikov, 1937
- Yigoga truculenta Lederer, 1853
- Yigoga weigerti Hacker & Varga, 1990
- Yigoga wiltshirei Boursin, 1940
- Zebeeba falsalis Herrich-Schäffer, [1851]
- Zethes brandti Janson, 1977
- Zethes insularis Rambur, 1833
- Zethes narghisa Brandt, 1938
- Unplaced carthalina Christoph, 1893
