= Belceğiz Bay =

Bay in Turkey

Belceğiz Bay (also called Belcekız Bay) is a small Mediterranean bay of Turkey. It is situated in Fethiye ilçe (district) of Muğla Province at 36°30′N 29°07′E. The width of the bay is about 500 metres (1,600 ft) and it offers a good beach. It is the end point of a touristic valley called Butterfly Valley (Turkish: Kelebekler Vadisi). Its highway distance to Dalaman Airport is about 35 kilometres (22 mi) and its birds-flight distance to Ölüdeniz is about 5.5 kilometres (3.4 mi).
