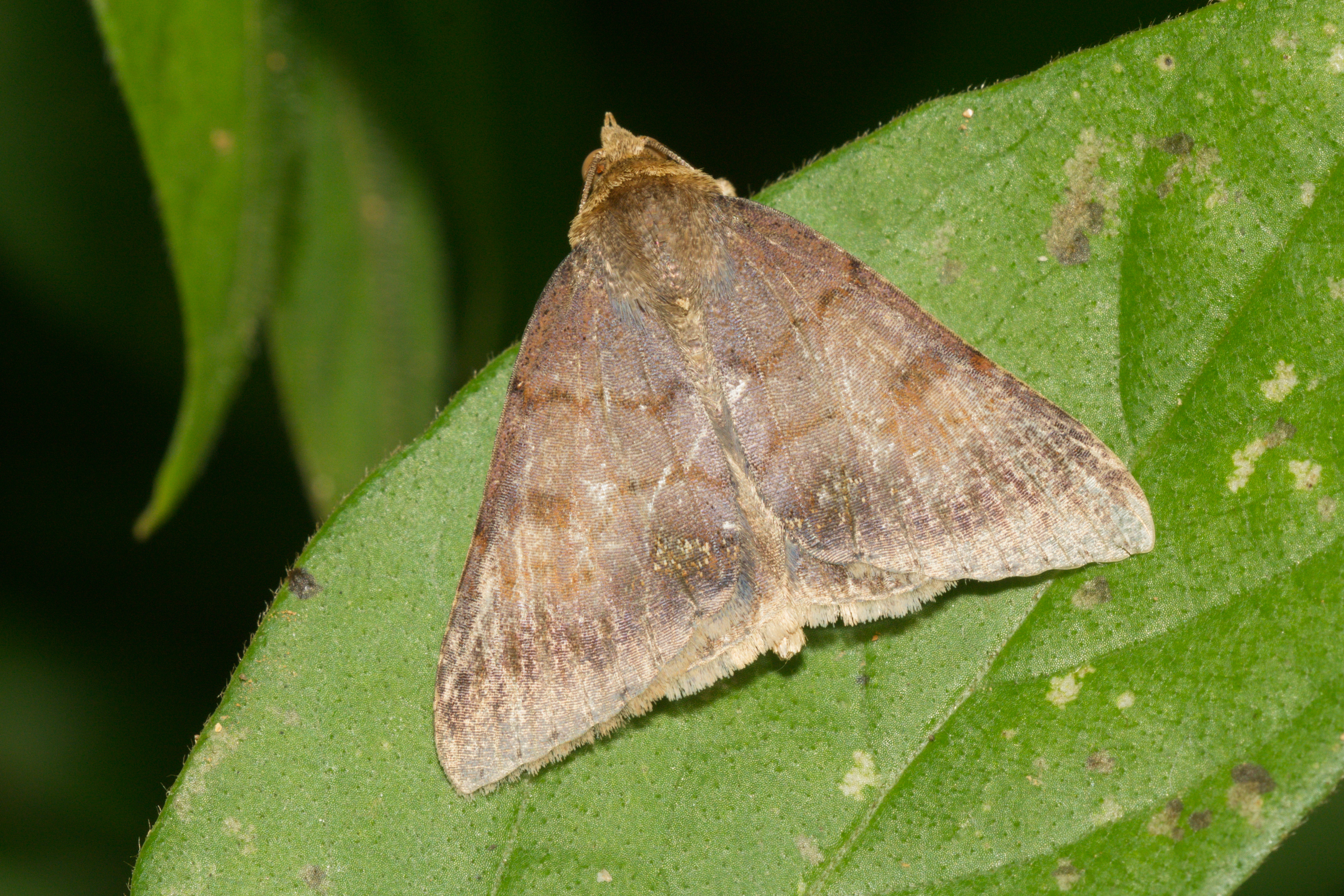
- Plecoptera sp.

Scientific classification
- Kingdom: Animalia
- Phylum: Arthropoda
- Class: Insecta
- Order: Lepidoptera
- Superfamily: Noctuoidea
- Family: Erebidae
- Subfamily: Anobinae
- Genus: Plecoptera; Guenée in Boisduval & Guenée, 1852

Synonyms
- Biregula Saalmüller, 1891; Carteia Walker, 1863; Plecopteroides Strand, 1918

= Plecoptera (moth) =

Genus of moths

Plecoptera is a genus of moths of the family Erebidae. It was described by Achille Guenée in 1852.

== Description ==
Palpi slight and reaching vertex of head, where the third joint minute. Antennae of male with long cilia and bristles. Thorax and abdomen smoothly scaled. Tibia slightly hairy and spineless. Forewings with nearly rectangular apex.

== Species ==
- Plecoptera albipuncta Viette, 1970
- Plecoptera androconiata Hampson, 1926
- Plecoptera annexa (Distant, 1898)
- Plecoptera approximans Hampson, 1926
- Plecoptera arctinotata (Walker, 1865)
- Plecoptera aspila (Hampson, 1910)
- Plecoptera butkevicii Hacker & Saldaitis, 2010
- Plecoptera chalciope (Strand, 1918)
- Plecoptera costisignata Hampson, 1926
- Plecoptera delos (Viette, 1972)
- Plecoptera dentilinea Hampson, 1926
- Plecoptera dimorpha Gaede, 1939
- Plecoptera diplogramma Hampson, 1926
- Plecoptera diplosticha Hampson, 1926
- Plecoptera divergens Strand, 1915
- Plecoptera flaviceps (Hampson, 1902)
- Plecoptera flavilinea Hampson, 1910
- Plecoptera fletcherana Viette, 1966
- Plecoptera geminilinea Hampson, 1926
- Plecoptera grisea Hampson, 1910
- Plecoptera hypoxantha Hampson, 1926
- Plecoptera infuscata Hampson, 1910
- Plecoptera inquinata Lederer, 1857
- Plecoptera lacinia (Saalmüller, 1880)
- Plecoptera laniata Hampson, 1910
- Plecoptera leucosticha Hampson, 1926
- Plecoptera mainty Viette, 1972
- Plecoptera major (Holland, 1894)
- Plecoptera megarthra Hampson, 1910
- Plecoptera melalepis Hampson, 1910
- Plecoptera melanoscia Hampson, 1926
- Plecoptera mesostriga Hampson, 1926
- Plecoptera misera (Butler, 1883)
- Plecoptera mollardi D. S. Fletcher & Viette, 1955
- Plecoptera nebulilinea Walker, 1863
- Plecoptera nigrilunata Gaede, 1939
- Plecoptera nimba D. S. Fletcher & Viette, 1955
- Plecoptera oculata (Moore, 1882) (from India)
- Plecoptera ovaliplaga (Warren, 1914)
- Plecoptera poderis (Wallengren, 1863)
- Plecoptera polymorpha Hampson, 1916
- Plecoptera punctilineata Hampson, 1910
- Plecoptera quaesita Swinhoe, 1885
- Plecoptera quadrilineata (Moore 1882) (from India)
- Plecoptera recens Saalmüller, 1891
- Plecoptera recta Pagenstecher, 1886
- Plecoptera reflexa Guenée, 1852
- Plecoptera resistens (Walker, 1858)
- Plecoptera reussi Bryk, 1915
- Plecoptera reversa (Walker, 1865)
- Plecoptera rufirena (Hampson, 1902)
- Plecoptera sakalava (Viette, 1976)
- Plecoptera sarcistis Hampson, 1910
- Plecoptera stuhlmanni (Pagenstecher, 1893)
- Plecoptera thermozona Hampson, 1910
- Plecoptera trichophora Hampson, 1910
- Plecoptera tripalis (Wallengren, 1863)
- Plecoptera uniformis (Moore, 1882) (from India)
- Plecoptera violacea (Pagenstecher, 1884)
- Plecoptera zonaria (Distant, 1898)
