= Aedophron sumorita =

Scientific classification
- Domain: Eukaryota
- Kingdom: Animalia
- Phylum: Arthropoda
- Class: Insecta
- Order: Lepidoptera
- Superfamily: Noctuoidea
- Family: Noctuidae
- Genus: Aedophron
- Species: A. sumorita

Binomial name
- Aedophron sumorita Ronkay, 2002

Species of moth

Aedophron sumorita is a species of moth of the family Noctuidae. It is found in Iran.
