= Aedophron =

Scientific classification
- Domain: Eukaryota
- Kingdom: Animalia
- Phylum: Arthropoda
- Class: Insecta
- Order: Lepidoptera
- Superfamily: Noctuoidea
- Family: Noctuidae
- Subfamily: Heliothinae
- Genus: Aedophron; Lederer, 1857

Genus of moths

Aedophron is a genus of moths insubfamily Heliothinae of family Noctuidae.

== Species ==
- Aedophron phlebophora Lederer, 1858
- Aedophron rhodites (Eversmann, 1851)
- Aedophron sumorita Ronkay, 2002
- Aedophron venosa Christoph, 1887
