= Plecoptera nebulilinea =

Scientific classification
- Kingdom: Animalia
- Phylum: Arthropoda
- Class: Insecta
- Order: Lepidoptera
- Superfamily: Noctuoidea
- Family: Erebidae
- Genus: Plecoptera
- Species: P. nebulilinea

Binomial name
- Plecoptera nebulilinea Walker, 1863

Synonyms
- Carteia nebulilinea

Species of moth

Plecoptera nebulilinea is a species of moth of the family Noctuidae. It is found in Borneo and the Peninsular Malaysia.
