= Plecoptera quaesita =

Scientific classification
- Domain: Eukaryota
- Kingdom: Animalia
- Phylum: Arthropoda
- Class: Insecta
- Order: Lepidoptera
- Superfamily: Noctuoidea
- Family: Erebidae
- Genus: Plecoptera
- Species: P. quaesita

Binomial name
- Plecoptera quaesita Swinhoe, 1885

Synonyms
- Remigia quaesita Swinhoe, 1885; Plecoptera fetna Swinhoe, 1915; Plecoptera lobelia Swinhoe, 1915

Species of moth

Plecoptera quaesita is a species of moth of the family Noctuidae. It is found in India, Sri Lanka, Burma, Andamans, Borneo, Northern Moluccas and Australia.
