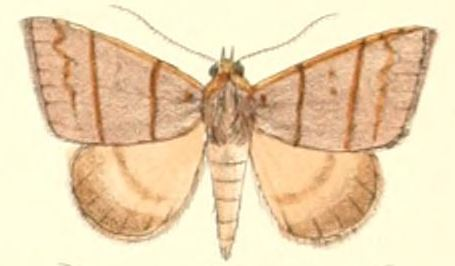

Scientific classification
- Domain: Eukaryota
- Kingdom: Animalia
- Phylum: Arthropoda
- Class: Insecta
- Order: Lepidoptera
- Superfamily: Noctuoidea
- Family: Erebidae
- Genus: Plecoptera
- Species: P. quadrilineata

Binomial name
- Plecoptera quadrilineata (Moore, 1882)

Synonyms
- Poaphila quadrilineata Moore, 1882

= Plecoptera quadrilineata =

Species of moth

Plecoptera quadrilineata is a species of moth of the family Erebidae first described by Frederic Moore in 1882. It is found in India.
