= Butterfly Valley, Fethiye =

Valley in Turkey

- Kelebekler Vadisi
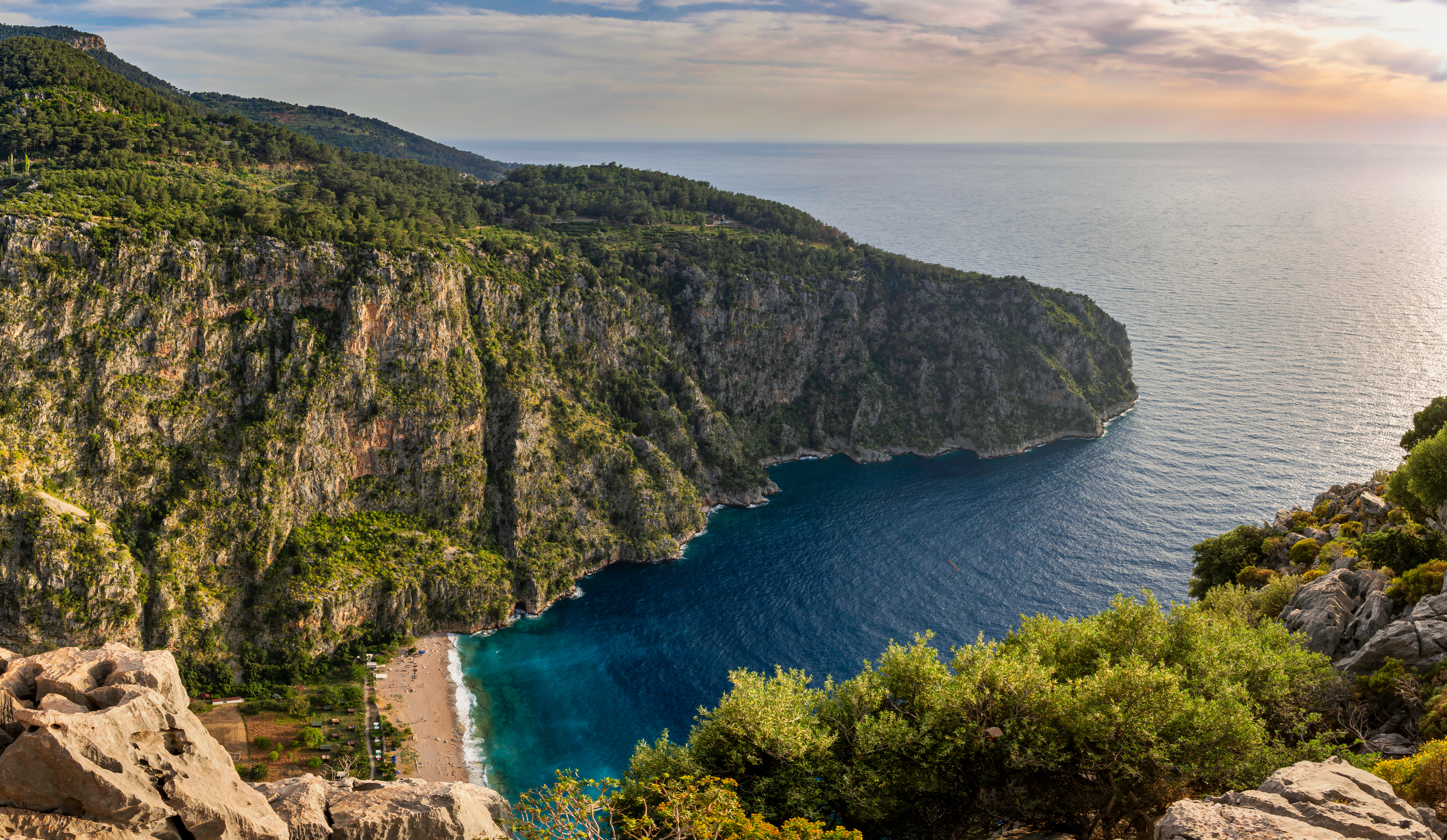
- Butterfly Valley in Fethiye

- Location within Turkey
- Length: 3–4 km (1.9–2.5 mi) East-west
- Depth: 350–400 m (1,150–1,310 ft)

Geography
- Location: Fethiye, Muğla Province, Turkey
- Coordinates: 36°29′48″N 29°07′38″E
- Interactive map of Butterfly Valley, Fethiye

Butterfly Valley (Turkish: Kelebekler Vadisi) is a valley in Fethiye district, Muğla Province, on the Mediterranean coast of Turkey. The valley is home to diverse butterfly species.

== Valley ==
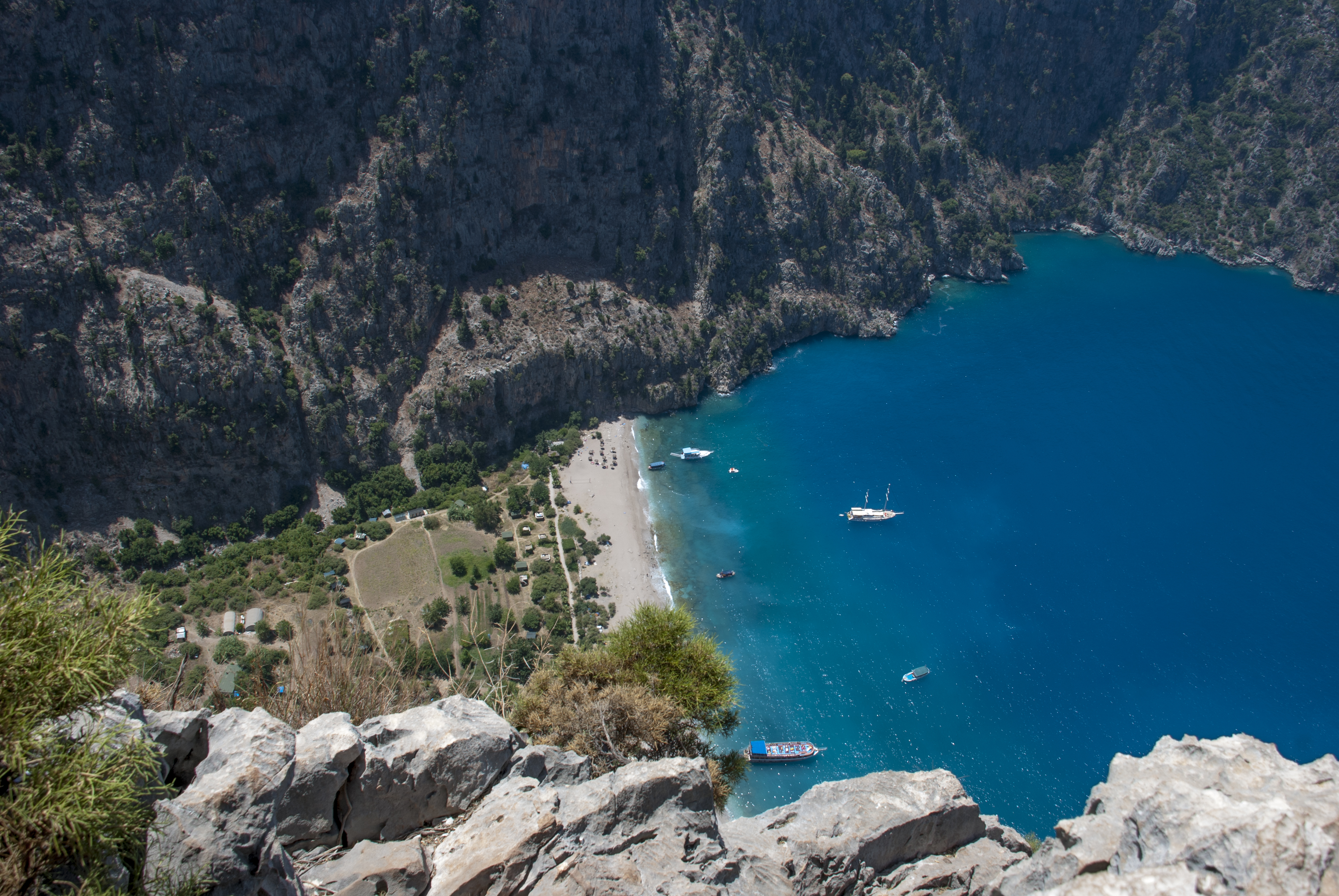
Butterfly Valley

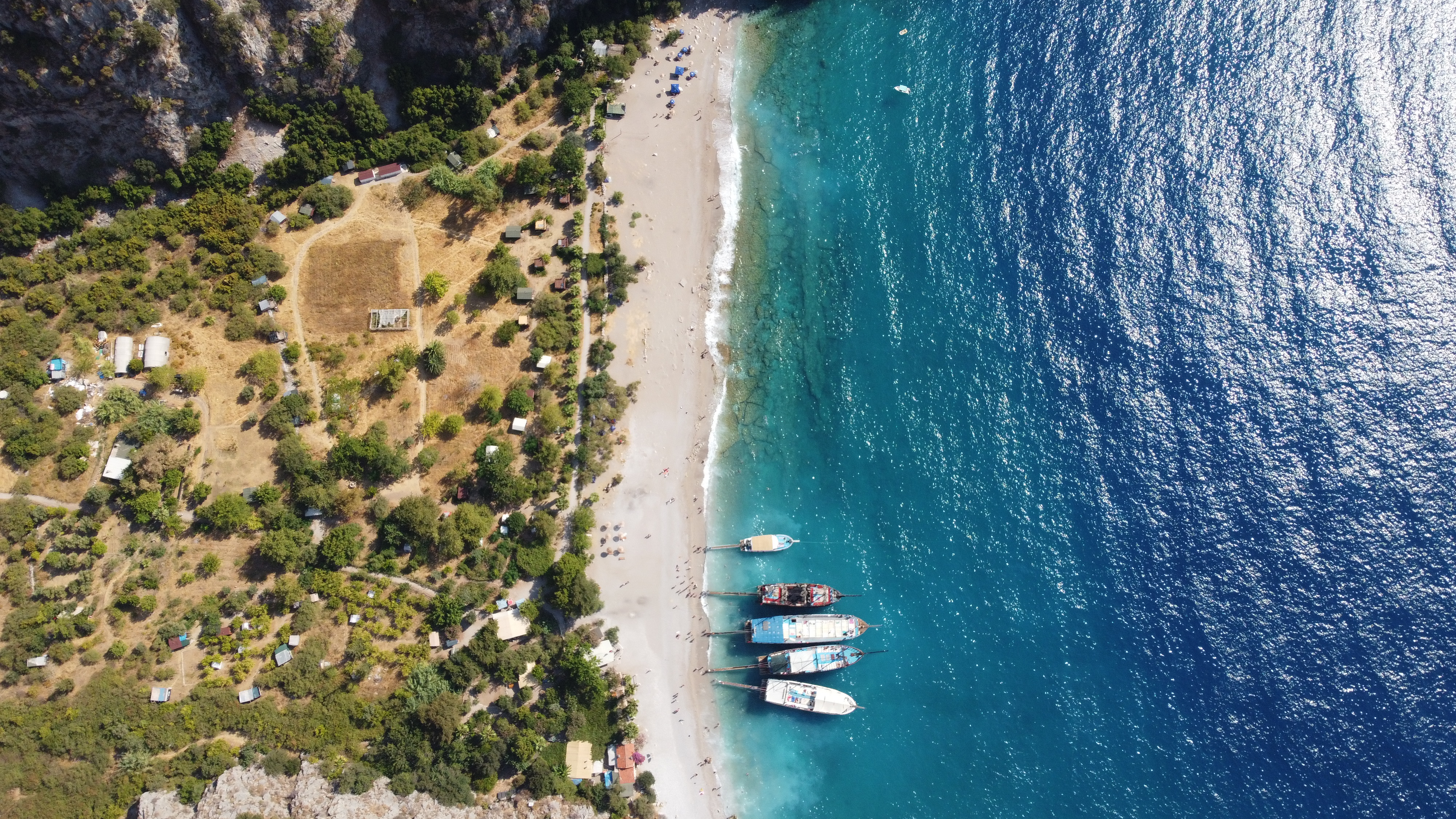
Butterfly Valley beach

The valley is situated at the foothill of Babadağ, a 1,975-metre-high (6,480 ft) mountain nominated for preservation as world heritage. A wide-strip sand beach at a bay on the Turkish Riviera protrudes from the valley.

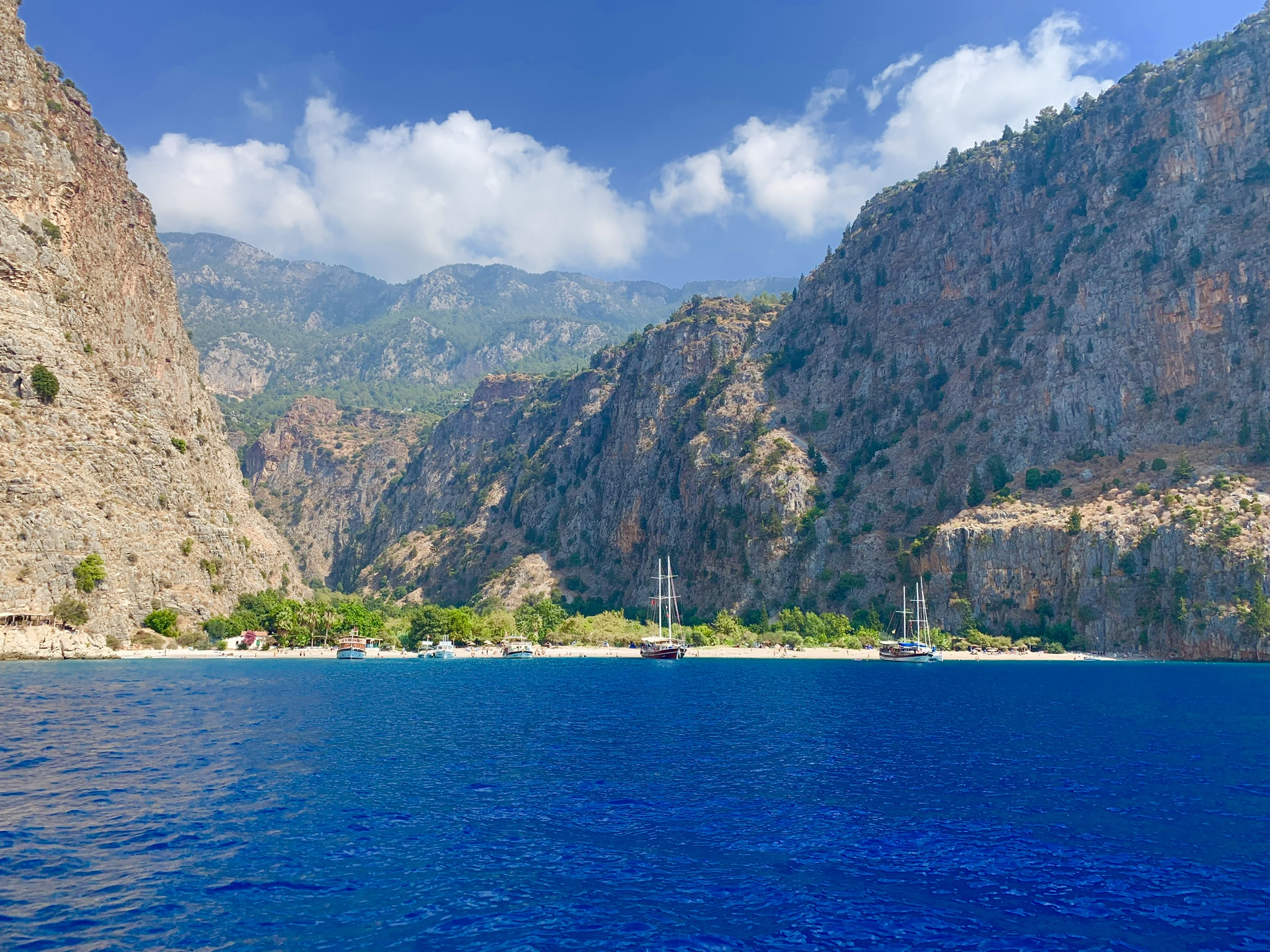
Butterfly Valley seen from the sea

In the form of a narrow canyon stretching over around 3–4 km (1.9–2.5 mi), the valley's steep walls are 350–400 m (1,150–1,310 ft) high. A trail in the valley leads to two small waterfalls dropping from 60 m (200 ft) all the year around. In the middle of the valley, a creek runs, carrying water from a spring in nearby Faralya village to the sea. A road from Ölüdeniz to Uzunyurt, which is part of the Lycian Way Ultramarathon route, runs atop the rocks around the valley.

== Flora and fauna ==
The valley, rich in flora and fauna, takes its name from the large number of butterfly species found here. Scientists recorded some 147 flora species belonging to 54 families and 105 butterfly species from 15 families native to the valley. The butterfly species include the Jersey tiger (Euplagia quadripunctaria rhodosensis). Butterflies of many varieties in a wide range of colors can be observed in the valley between June and September.

== Ecotourism ==
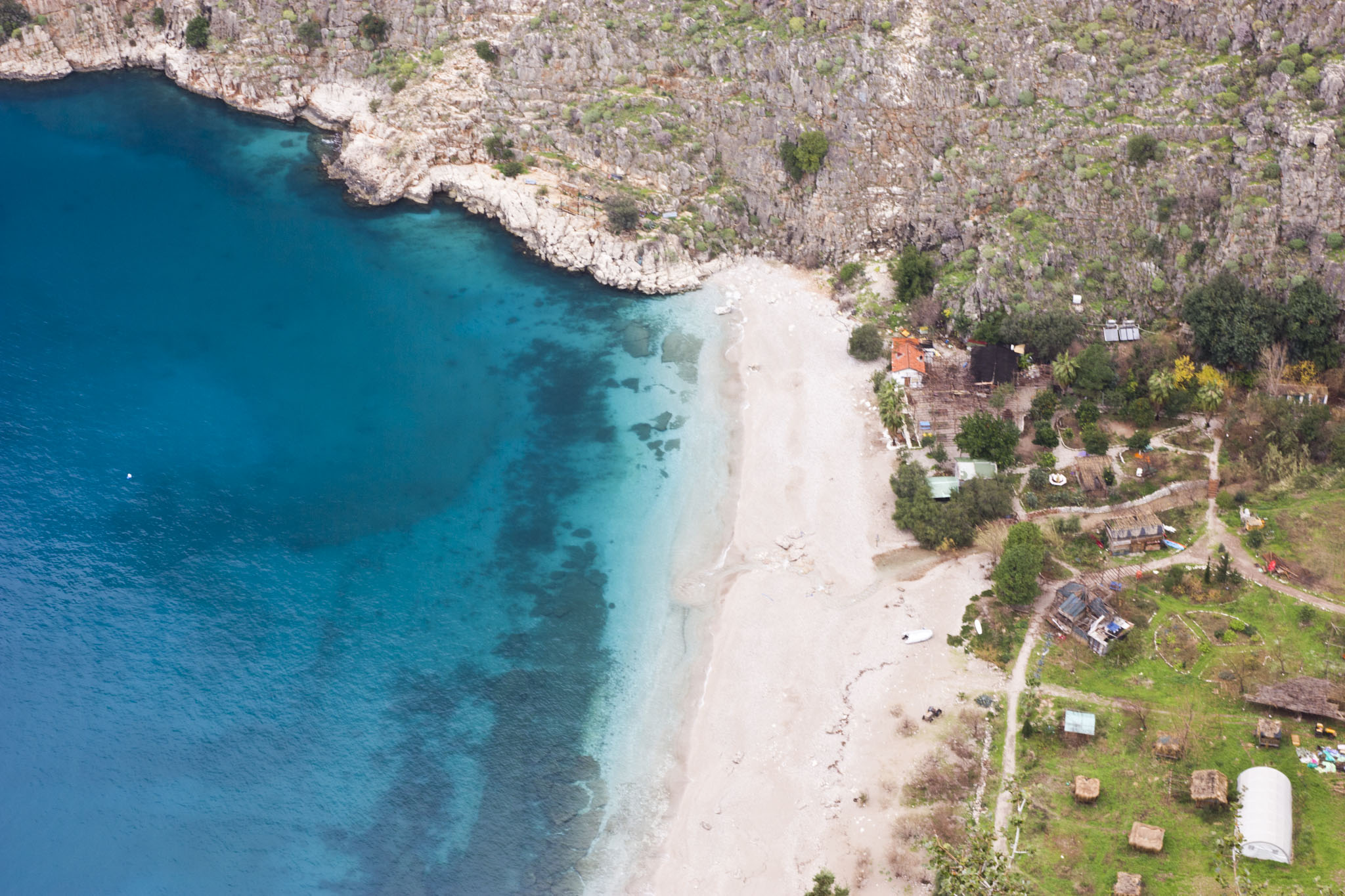
A view of Butterfly Valley from the cliffs

Due to its natural beauty, Butterfly Valley is an important ecotourism attraction place in Turkey. It is accessible by shuttle boat service from Belceğiz Beach of Ölüdeniz in 5–7 km (3.1–4.3 mi) distance, operating hourly at daytime. In the valley, various outdoor activities such as camping, hiking, canyoning, canoeing and scuba diving can be performed. The valley is open to public the entire year. During July and August, around 200 visitors camp daily in the valley.

Designated a nature reserve as protected area of first category on February 8, 1995, any type of construction in Butterfly Valley is strictly prohibited by law. Therefore, only temporary structures are allowed here. On an area of 10 daa (10,000 m^{2}), up to 250 people can be accommodated in tents in addition to a few simple wooden bungalows. Central sanitary facilities are for shared use. Electricity is supplied by a generator, available free of charge during certain times of the day. A small country restaurant and a bar provide food and beverages in the summer time.

== Controversy ==
Officials in the valley, along with campers, have complained about disturbances caused by tour sailboats, which frequently stop there. A music festival, held in May 2013, was sharply criticized by local environmentalists.

== Gallery ==
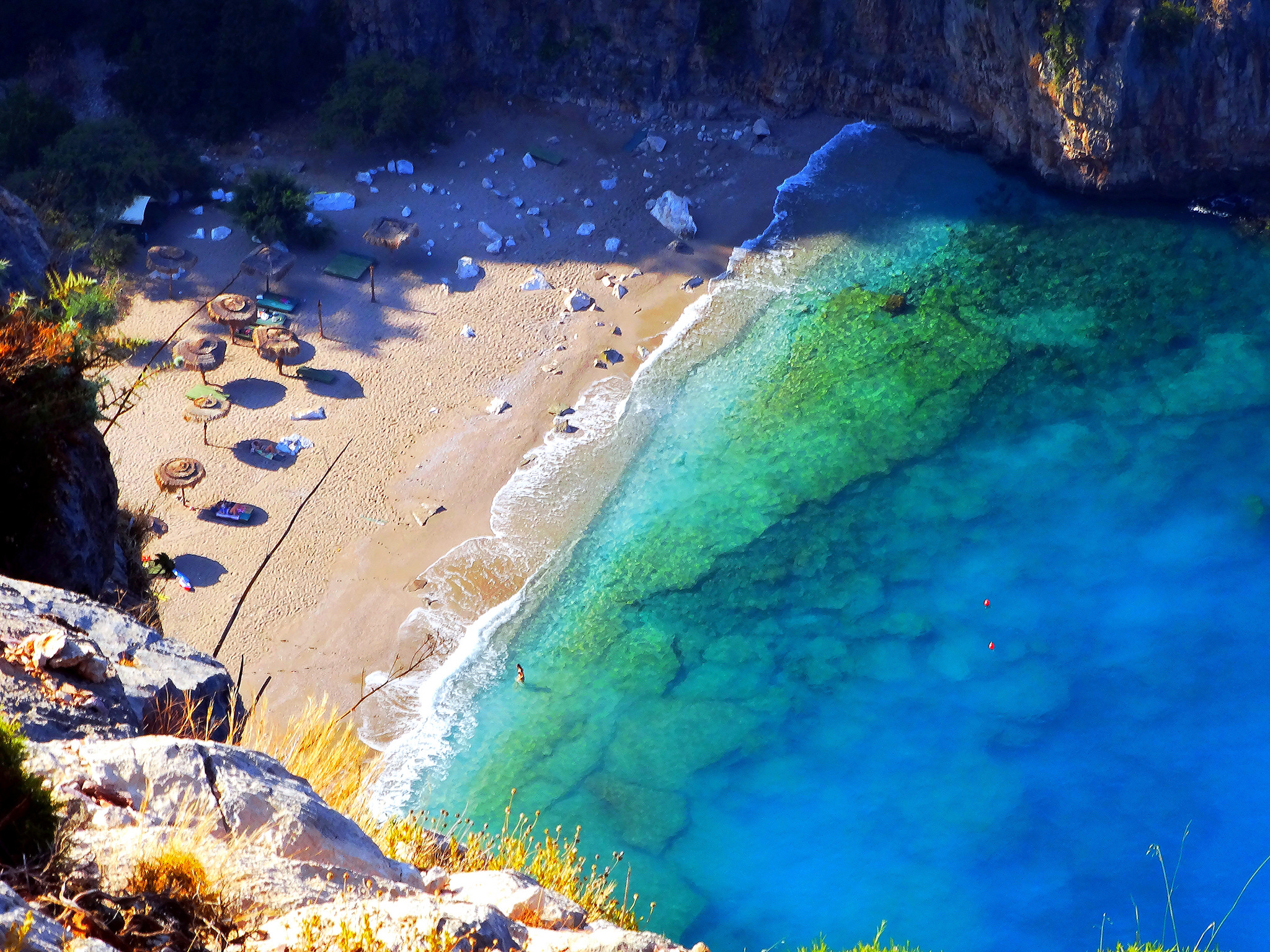

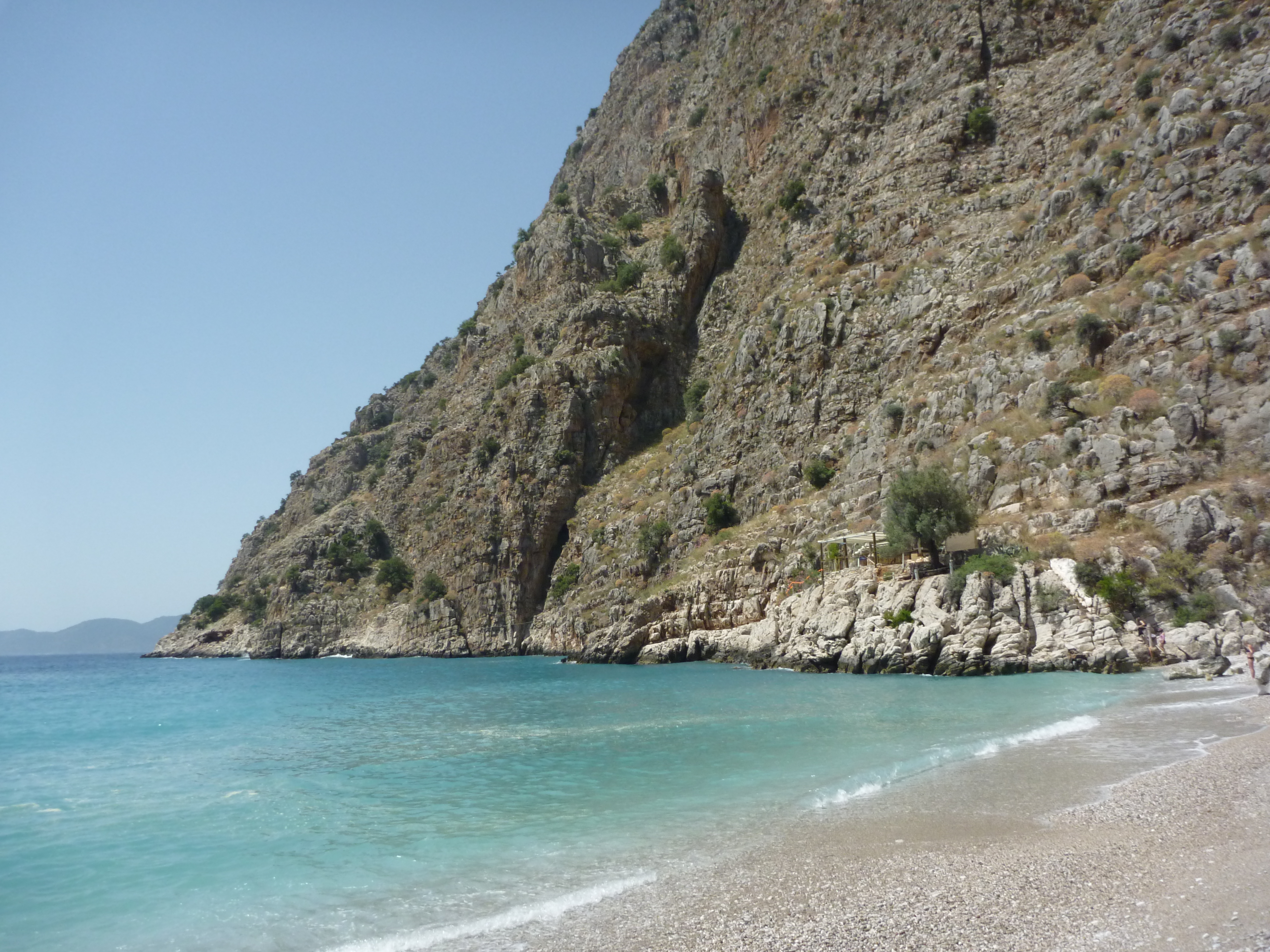

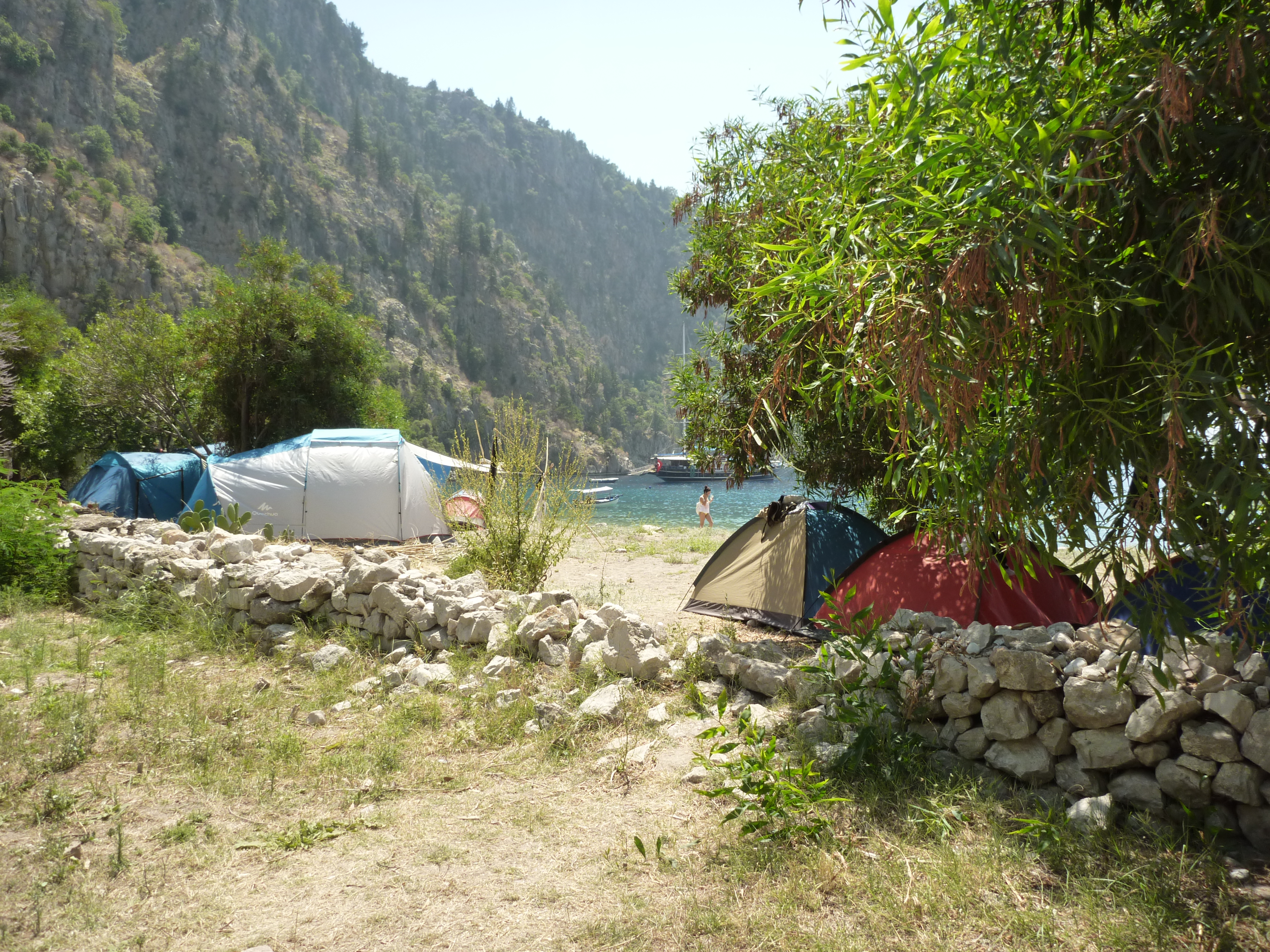

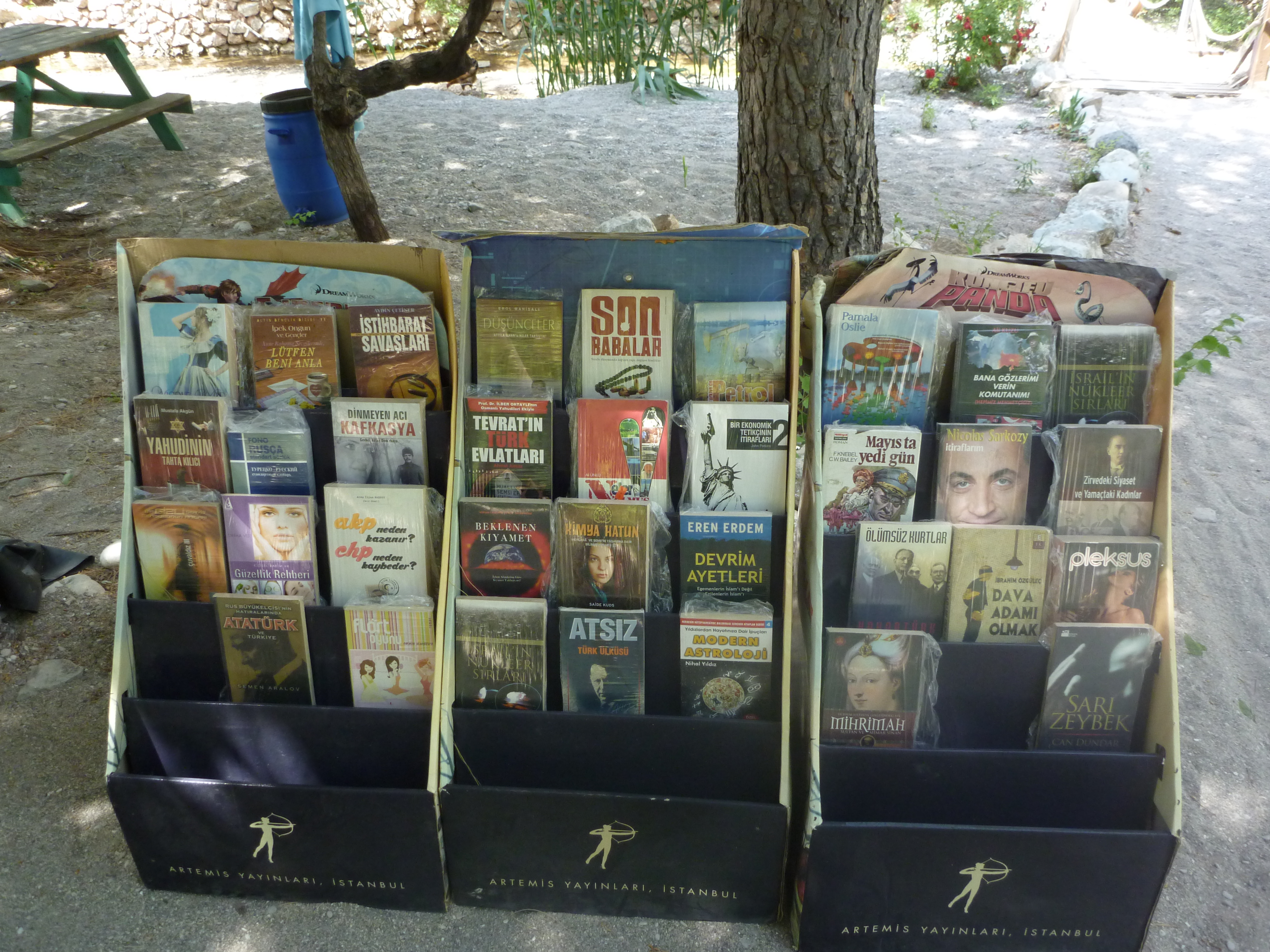

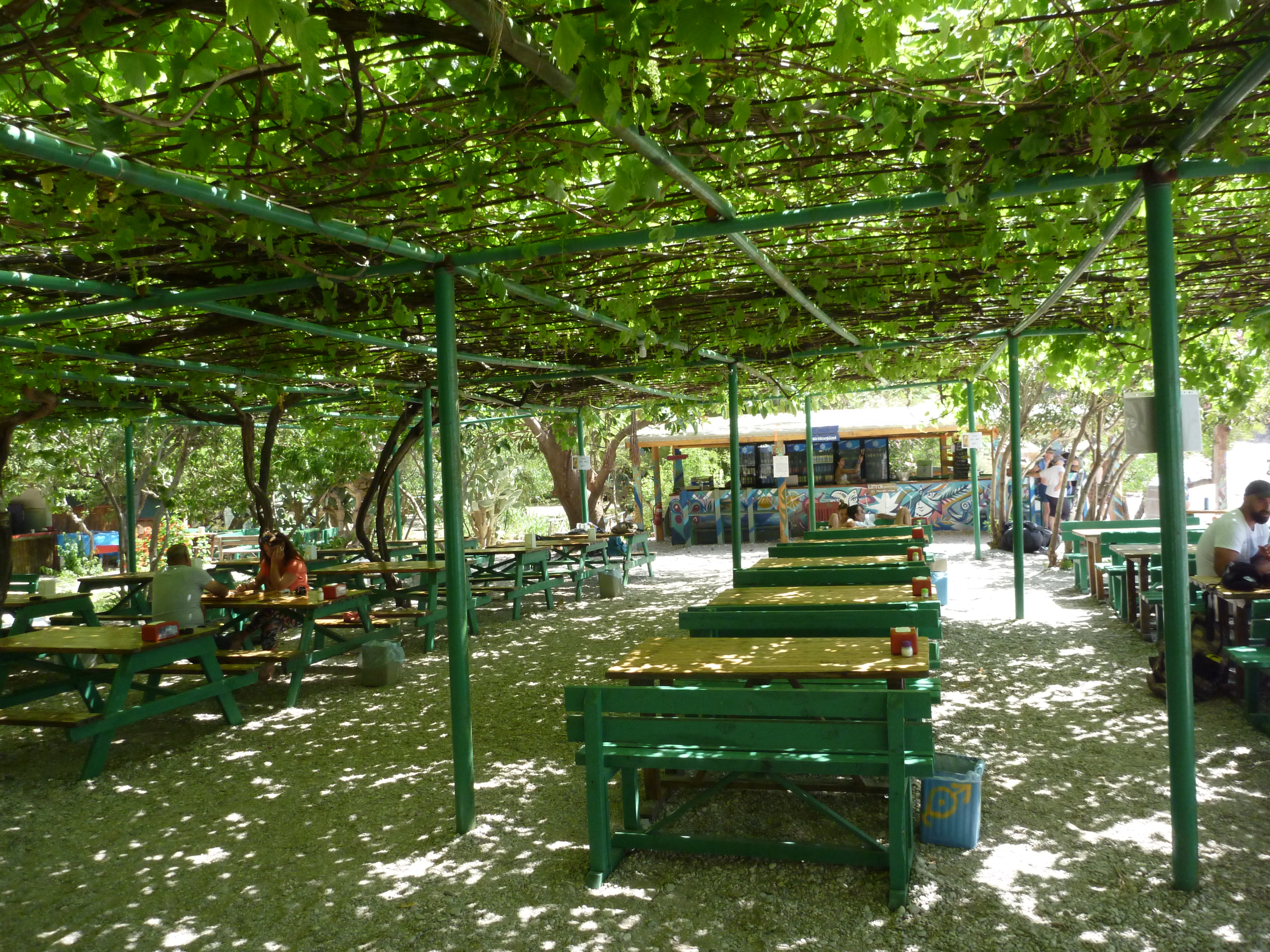

== See also ==
- List of butterflies of Turkey
- List of moths of Turkey (Noctuidae)
