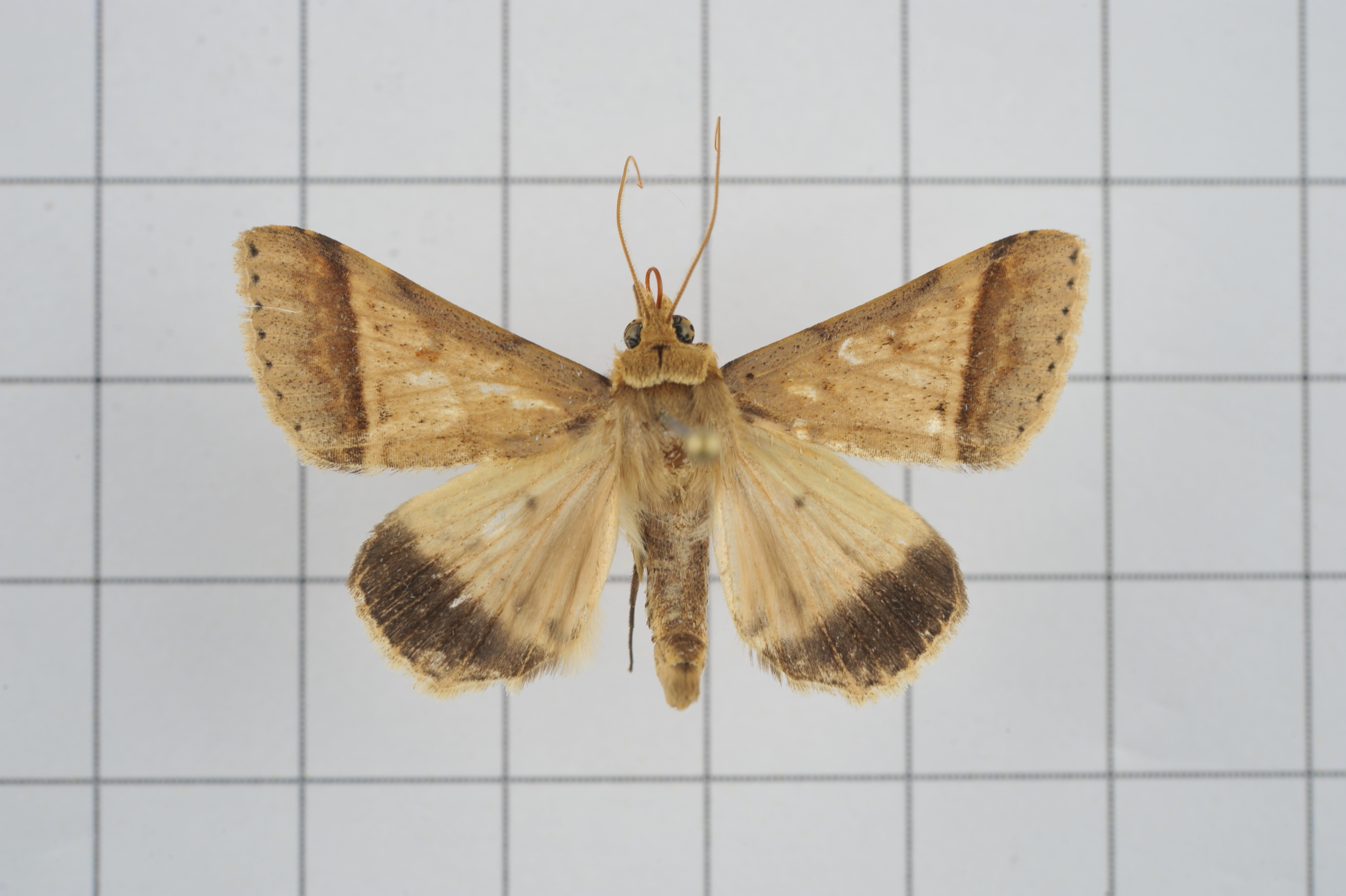

Scientific classification
- Domain: Eukaryota
- Kingdom: Animalia
- Phylum: Arthropoda
- Class: Insecta
- Order: Lepidoptera
- Superfamily: Noctuoidea
- Family: Erebidae
- Genus: Plecoptera
- Species: P. violacea

Binomial name
- Plecoptera violacea Pagenstecher, 1884

Synonyms
- Heliothis violacea Pagenstecher, 1884; Remigia crinigera Swinhoe, 1897; Plecoptera antigona Holland, 1900; Carteia grisea Warren, 1912; Carteia roeniata Warren, 1912

= Plecoptera violacea =

Species of moth

Plecoptera violacea is a species of moth of the family Erebidae first described by Pagenstecher in 1884. It is found from Sundaland east to New Guinea, New Caledonia and Fiji.

Larvae have been recorded on Erythrina, Pterocarpus, Senna, Pterocarpus, Randia, Psychotria, Tarenna and Phyllanthus.
