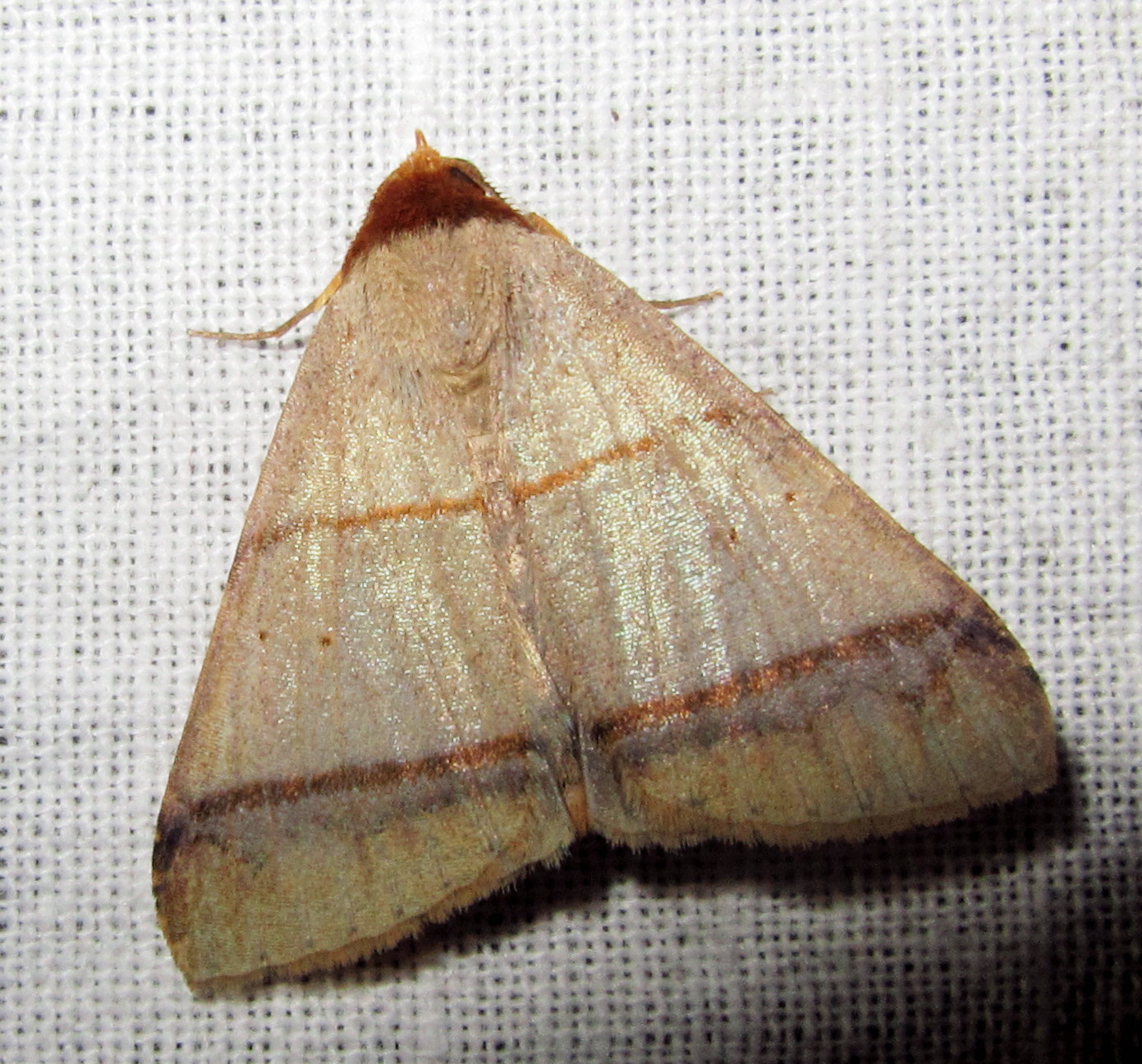

Scientific classification
- Domain: Eukaryota
- Kingdom: Animalia
- Phylum: Arthropoda
- Class: Insecta
- Order: Lepidoptera
- Superfamily: Noctuoidea
- Family: Erebidae
- Genus: Plecoptera
- Species: P. recta

Binomial name
- Plecoptera recta Pagenstecher, 1886

Synonyms
- Madopa recta Pagenstecher, 1886; Poaphila erica Swinhoe, 1891

= Plecoptera recta =

Species of moth

Plecoptera recta is a species of moth of the family Erebidae. It is found in Seram, Sulawesi, Southern India, Thailand, Peninsular Malaysia and Borneo.

The larvae feed on Dalbergia species.
