= Aedophron venosa =

Scientific classification
- Domain: Eukaryota
- Kingdom: Animalia
- Phylum: Arthropoda
- Class: Insecta
- Order: Lepidoptera
- Superfamily: Noctuoidea
- Family: Noctuidae
- Genus: Aedophron
- Species: A. venosa

Binomial name
- Aedophron venosa Christoph, 1887

Species of moth

Aedophron venosa is a species of moth of the family Noctuidae. It is found in Turkmenistan and Iran.
