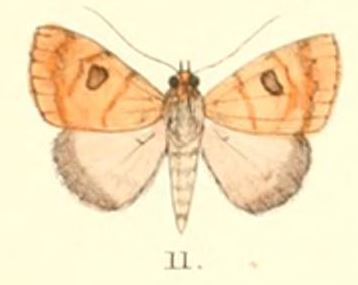

Scientific classification
- Kingdom: Animalia
- Phylum: Arthropoda
- Class: Insecta
- Order: Lepidoptera
- Superfamily: Noctuoidea
- Family: Erebidae
- Genus: Plecoptera
- Species: P. oculata

Binomial name
- Plecoptera oculata (Moore, 1882)

Synonyms
- Poaphila oculata Moore, 1882

= Plecoptera oculata =

Species of moth

Plecoptera oculata is a species of moth of the family Erebidae first described by Frederic Moore in 1882. It is found in India.
