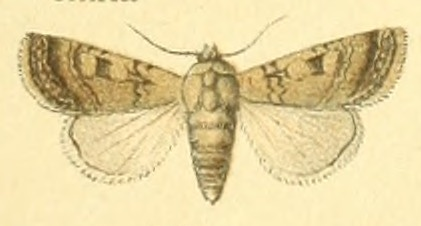

Scientific classification
- Domain: Eukaryota
- Kingdom: Animalia
- Phylum: Arthropoda
- Class: Insecta
- Order: Lepidoptera
- Superfamily: Noctuoidea
- Family: Noctuidae
- Genus: Euxoa
- Species: E. hilaris

Binomial name
- Euxoa hilaris (Freyer, 1838)

Synonyms
- Agrotis hilaris Freyer, 1838

= Euxoa hilaris =

Species of moth

Euxoa hilaris is a moth of the family Noctuidae. It is found in Turkey, southern and eastern Russia, Bulgaria, Turkmenia, the Caucasus, Armenia, Lebanon, Iraq and Iran.
