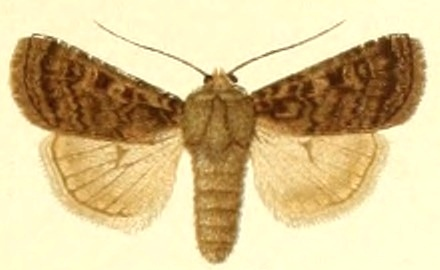

Scientific classification
- Domain: Eukaryota
- Kingdom: Animalia
- Phylum: Arthropoda
- Class: Insecta
- Order: Lepidoptera
- Superfamily: Noctuoidea
- Family: Noctuidae
- Genus: Euxoa
- Species: E. mustelina

Binomial name
- Euxoa mustelina (Christoph, 1877)

Synonyms
- Euxoa centralis; Agrotis mustelina Christoph, 1877

= Euxoa mustelina =

Species of moth

Euxoa mustelina is a moth of the family Noctuidae. It is found in Turkey, Iran, Armenia, Turkmenia, Issyk-Kul region, Ili, Saisan, the Altai Mountains and western Siberia. It has also been recorded from Romania.

== Subspecies ==
- Euxoa mustelina mustelina
- Euxoa mustelina centralis
