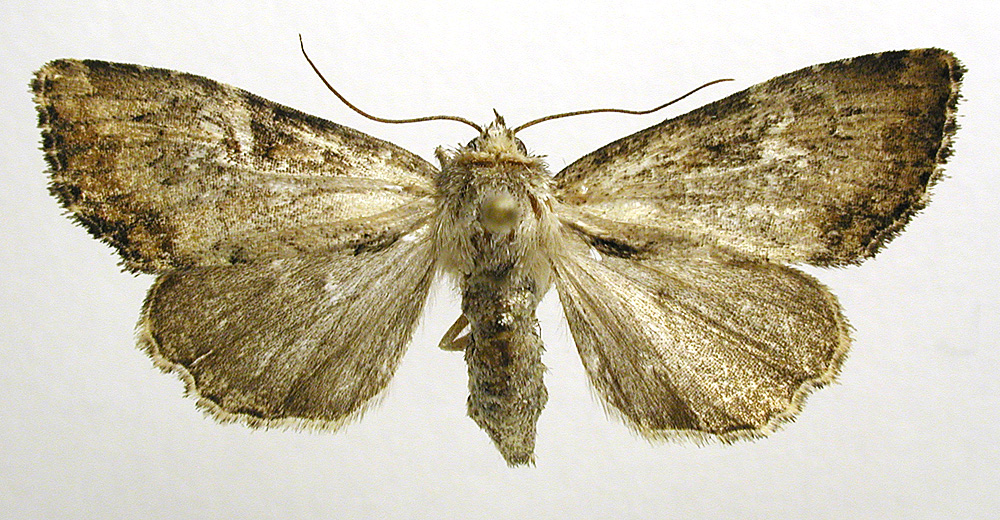

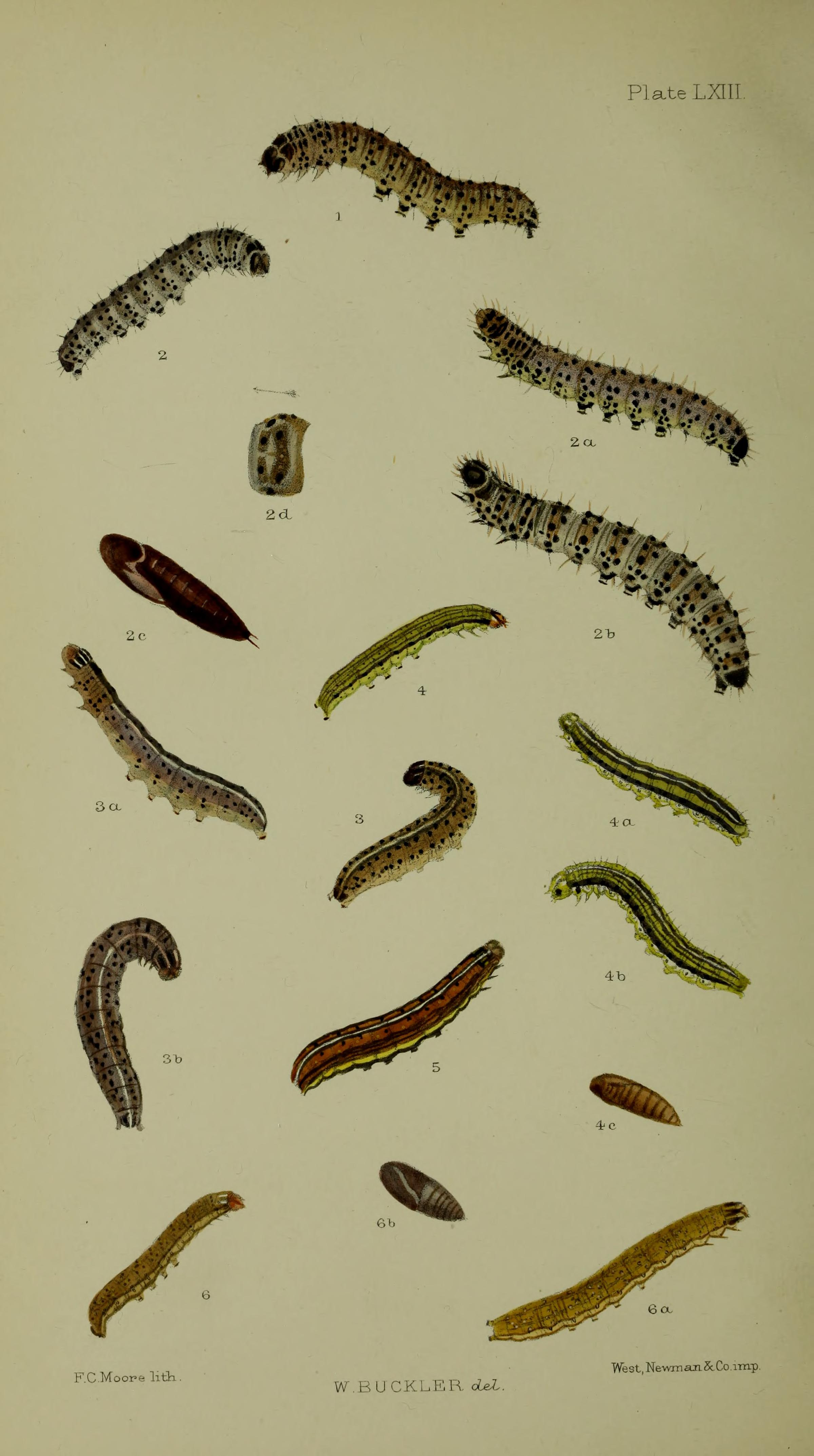
- Figs.4, 4a, 4b larva after last moult

Scientific classification
- Domain: Eukaryota
- Kingdom: Animalia
- Phylum: Arthropoda
- Class: Insecta
- Order: Lepidoptera
- Superfamily: Noctuoidea
- Family: Noctuidae
- Genus: Apamea
- Species: A. scolopacina

Binomial name
- Apamea scolopacina (Esper, 1788)

Synonyms
- Phalaena scolopacina; Noctua abbreviata

= Apamea scolopacina =

Slender brindle

Species of moth

Apamea scolopacina, the slender brindle, is a moth of the family Noctuidae. The species was first described by Eugenius Johann Christoph Esper in 1788. It is found across the Palearctic realm from central Europe to the Kuril Islands northeast of Japan.

The wingspan is 32–36 mm. Forewing pale ochreous, usually washed with pale brown; a black-brown streak on inner margin before inner line; inner and outer lines fine and double, conversely lunulate edentate on the veins; a dark brown or pale brown median shade, enlarged, like the inner line, on the costa into a cloud; orbicular stigma pale, brown edged: reniform with brown lunular centre and white annulus, constricted at middle; terminal area brown, traversed close to termen by the paler subterminal line which forms a pale spot at apex; fringe mottled brown and ochreous; hindwing ochreous washed with grey or fuscous; — in ab. abbreviata Haw. the ground colour is pale ochreous without the brownish suffusion; in hammoniensis Sauber the costal and terminal dark areas are intensified, and the whole wing is suffused with greyish fuscous; in the Japanese form, however, ab. subbrunnea ab. nov. [Warren], the whole wing is washed with pale brown; the oblique bar near base of inner margin is either brown or obsolete: the dark blotches on costa and the brown terminal area are pale brown; all the lines are obscured, the only clear marking being the whitish reniform; hindwing pale grey or brownish grey, with dark cellspot and outer line; in all the forms the male is regularly slightly darker than the female.

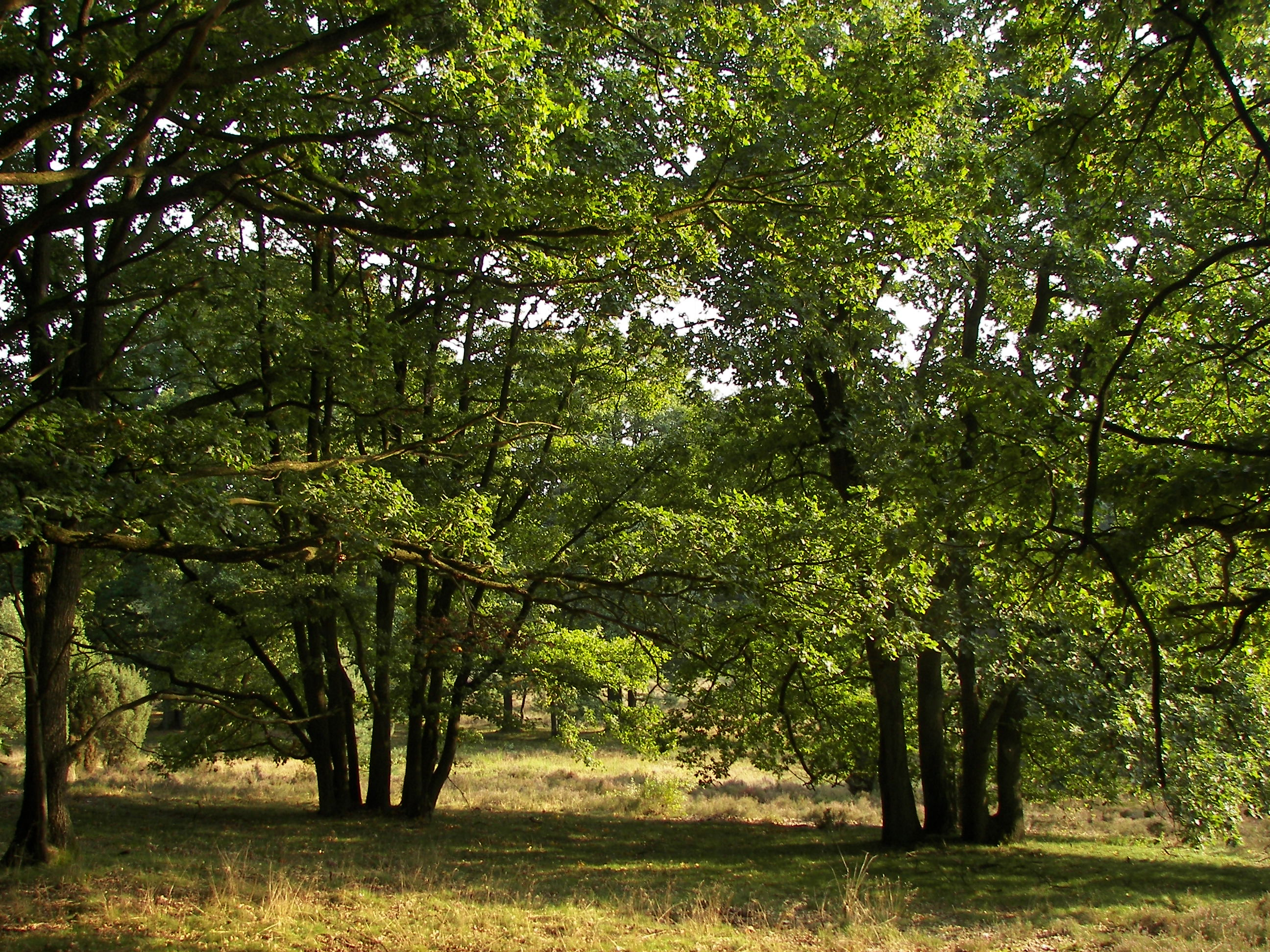
Habitat, Saxony

The adult is on wing from July to August depending on the location. It lives in woodlands.

The larvae feed on grasses of genera such as Milium, Deschampsia, and Briza, sedges such as Scirpus, and rushes of genus Luzula.
