= Euxoa christophi =

Scientific classification
- Kingdom: Animalia
- Phylum: Arthropoda
- Class: Insecta
- Order: Lepidoptera
- Superfamily: Noctuoidea
- Family: Noctuidae
- Genus: Euxoa
- Species: E. christophi

Binomial name
- Euxoa christophi (Staudinger, 1870)

Synonyms
- Agrotis christophi Staudinger, 1870

Species of moth

Euxoa christophi is a moth of the family Noctuidae. It is found on the steppes of southern Russia, the European part of Kazakhstan, western Turkestan and southern Ferghana.
