= Plecoptera inquinata =

Scientific classification
- Kingdom: Animalia
- Phylum: Arthropoda
- Class: Insecta
- Order: Lepidoptera
- Superfamily: Noctuoidea
- Family: Erebidae
- Genus: Plecoptera
- Species: P. inquinata

Binomial name
- Plecoptera inquinata Lederer, 1857

Synonyms
- Plecoptera pyramid Rogenhofer,1873; Plecoptera amanica Osthelder,1933

Species of moth

Plecoptera inquinata is a species of moth of the family Noctuidae first described by Julius Lederer in 1857. It is found in Turkey, Azerbaijan, Iran, Lebanon and Israel.

Adults are on wing from May to October. There are two generations per year.
