= Aedophron rhodites =

Scientific classification
- Kingdom: Animalia
- Phylum: Arthropoda
- Clade: Pancrustacea
- Class: Insecta
- Order: Lepidoptera
- Superfamily: Noctuoidea
- Family: Noctuidae
- Genus: Aedophron
- Species: A. rhodites

Binomial name
- Aedophron rhodites (Eversmann, 1851)

Synonyms
- Heliothis rhodites Eversmann, 1851

Species of moth

Aedophron rhodites is a species of moth of the family Noctuidae. It is found in the eastern Mediterranean, including the Balkans, through Ukraine and Moldova to central Asia.

It is found on dry steppes and semi-deserts in Eurasia. It is more common in central Asian oases.
