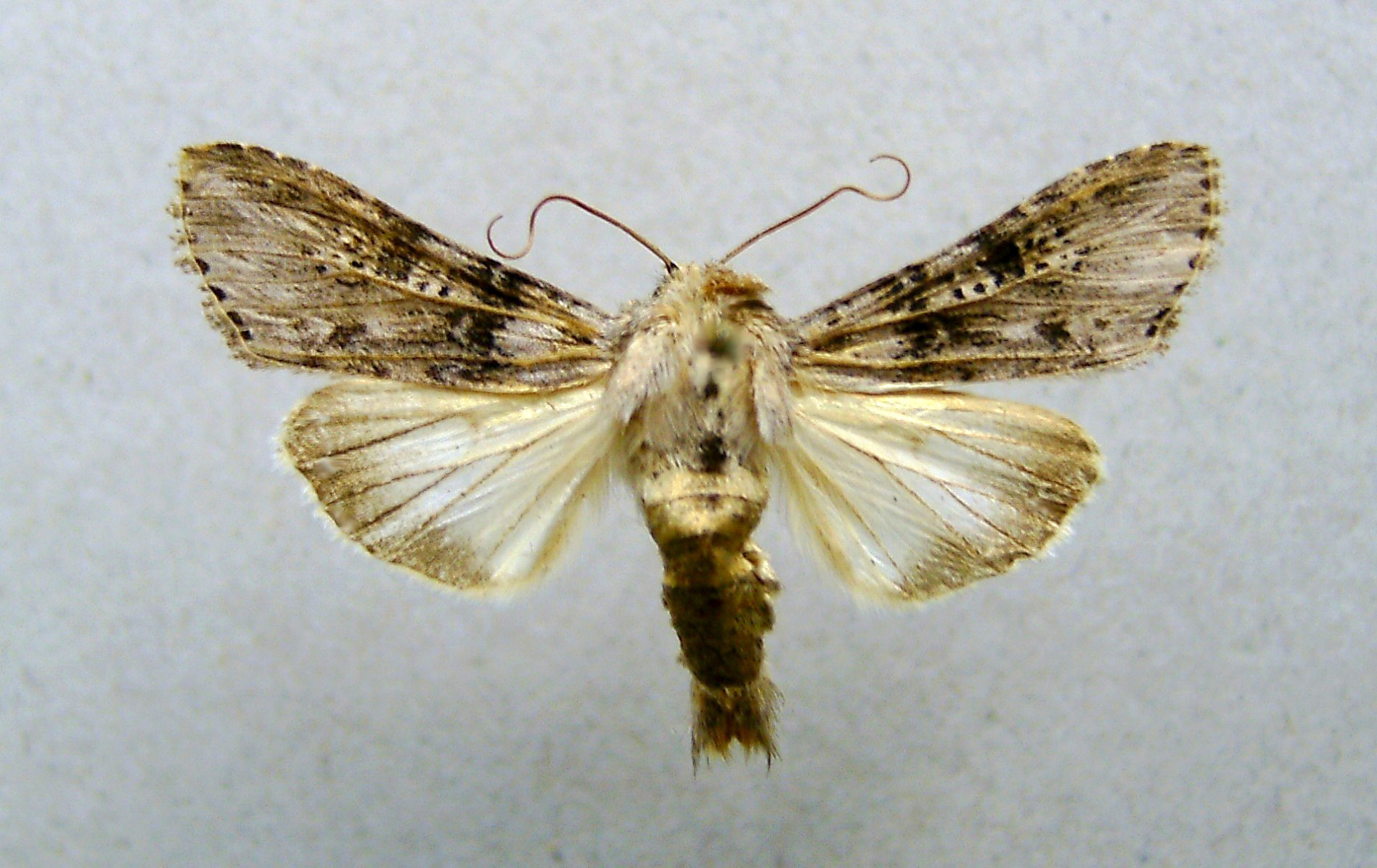

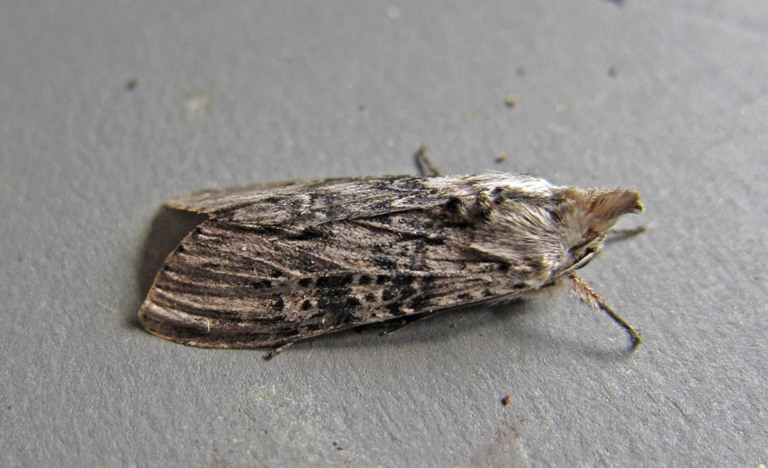

Scientific classification
- Kingdom: Animalia
- Phylum: Arthropoda
- Class: Insecta
- Order: Lepidoptera
- Superfamily: Noctuoidea
- Family: Noctuidae
- Genus: Cucullia
- Species: C. absinthii

Binomial name
- Cucullia absinthii (Linnaeus, 1761)

Synonyms
- Phalaena absinthii Linnaeus, 1761; Cucullia punctigera Hufnagel, 1766; Cucullia clausa Walker, 1857

= Cucullia absinthii =

Species of moth

Cucullia absinthii, the wormwood, is a moth of the family Noctuidae. The species was first described by Carl Linnaeus in 1761. It is found from Europe to the Caucasus, Turkey, northern Iran, western Siberia, the Altai Mountains, Tien-Shan and Tarbagatai.

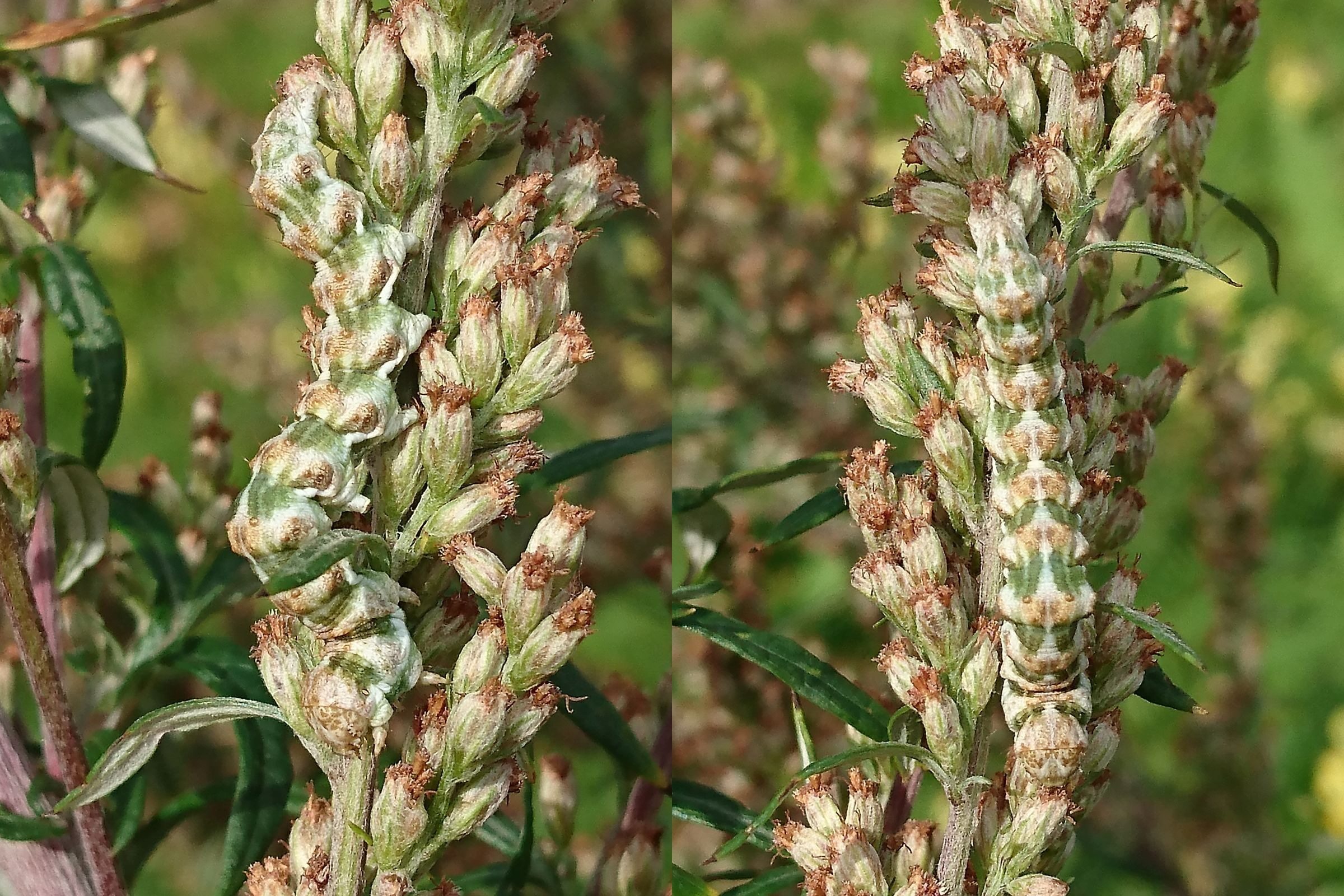
Caterpillar

== Description ==
The wingspan is 32–40 mm. Forewing long and narrow with produced apex; abdomen elongate especially in male, with lengthened anal tufts. Forewing grey with darker, clear markings; inner line angled outwards, outer line distinct only above inner margin, preceded by a black blotch on submedian fold; the edges of the inner line broadly black; a black streak from base below cell; the veins black before termen; short black dashes below veins 5 and 2; orbicular stigma and reniform stigmata marked by black spots; a black blotch from costa between the stigmata: terminal area uniformly grey. Hindwing dingy whitish, becoming fuscous before termen. The larva is naked except for a few short bristles and greenish with reddish-brown spots. It is markedly narrowed between the body joints so that it resembles a pearl necklace.

== Biology ==
Adults are on the wing from the start of June to the end of August. There is one generation per year.

The larvae feed on flowers and seeds of Artemisia absinthium and Artemisia vulgaris.
