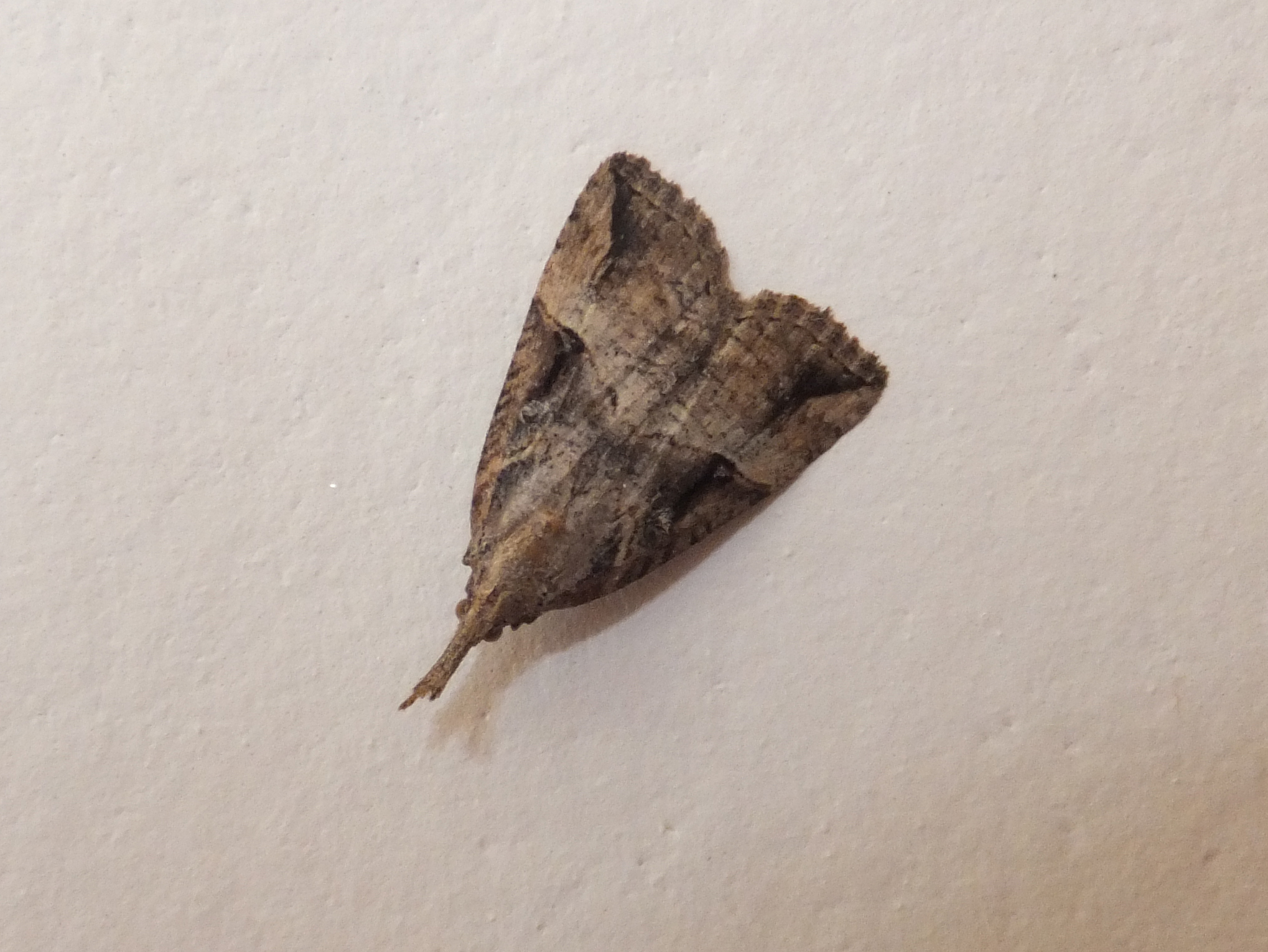

Scientific classification
- Domain: Eukaryota
- Kingdom: Animalia
- Phylum: Arthropoda
- Class: Insecta
- Order: Lepidoptera
- Superfamily: Noctuoidea
- Family: Erebidae
- Genus: Hypena
- Species: H. obesalis

Binomial name
- Hypena obesalis Treitschke, 1828

= Hypena obesalis =

Species of moth

Hypena obesalis, the Paignton snout, is a moth of the family Noctuoidea. It is found in Europe from the Iberian Peninsula through Central Europe in mountainous regions. To the east, the distribution area extends through the Palearctic to China. In the Alps it rises to altitudes of 2000 meters.

== Technical description and variation ==
B. obesalis Tr. Ground colour light ochreous, not white or grey; the inner line becomes obscure below median; the outer is vertically outcurved from subcostal to median vein with two smaller curves below. Larva grass green with yellow segmental incisions; dorsum grey; lateral lines slender, white; spiracles orange. The wingspan is ca. 40 mm.

== Biology ==
The moth flies from June onwards.

The larvae feed gregariously on nettle spinning up for pupation in a leaf.
