= Aedophron phlebophora =

Scientific classification
- Domain: Eukaryota
- Kingdom: Animalia
- Phylum: Arthropoda
- Class: Insecta
- Order: Lepidoptera
- Superfamily: Noctuoidea
- Family: Noctuidae
- Genus: Aedophron
- Species: A. phlebophora

Binomial name
- Aedophron phlebophora (Lederer, 1858)

Species of moth

Aedophron phlebophora is a moth of the family Noctuidae. It is found in Turkey, Iraq, Iran, Armenia and the Levant (recorded from Syria, Jordan and Israel).

Adults are on wing from June to July. There is one generation per year.

The larvae feed on Phlomis species.
