= C. elegans elegans =

C. elegans elegans may refer to:

- Calocheiridius elegans elegans, a pseudoscorpion subspecies
- Calochortus elegans elegans, a plant subspecies
- Cardiocondyla elegans elegans, an ant subspecies
- Carinostoma elegans elegans, a harvestman subspecies
- Caucasorhynchia elegans elegans, an extinct subspecies of brachiopods
- Celeus elegans elegans, the Russet-crested woodpecker, a subspecies of the chestnut woodpecker
- Centruroides elegans elegans, a scorpion subspecies found in Mexico
- Ceropales elegans elegans, a wasp subspecies
- Cephalota elegans elegans, a beetle subspecies
- Ceropegia elegans elegans, a plant subspecies
- Chaetanthera elegans elegans, a flowering plant subspecies found in Chile
- Chersotis elegans elegans, a moth subspecies
- Chitaura elegans elegans a subspecies of spur-throated grasshopper
- Chrysis elegans elegans, a wasp subspecies
- Coleonyx elegans elegans, a gecko subspecies
- Collaria elegans elegans, an amoebozoan subspecies
- Cormocephalus elegans elegans, a centipede subspecies
- Corydalis elegans elegans, a plant subspecies
- Cunninghamella elegans elegans, a fungus subspecies
- Cymatoderma elegans elegans, a fungus subspecies
- Cynosurus elegans elegans, a grass subspecies

== Synonyms ==
- Curimata elegans elegans, a synonym for Steindachnerina elegans, a fish

== See also ==
- C. elegans (disambiguation)
