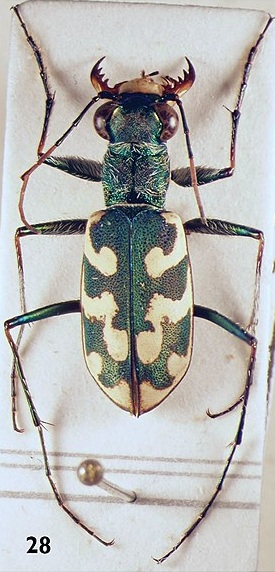

Scientific classification
- Kingdom: Animalia
- Phylum: Arthropoda
- Clade: Pancrustacea
- Class: Insecta
- Order: Coleoptera
- Suborder: Adephaga
- Family: Cicindelidae
- Genus: Cephalota
- Species: C. vartianorum

Binomial name
- Cephalota vartianorum (Mandl, 1967)

Synonyms
- Cicindela vartianorum Mandl, 1967

= Cephalota vartianorum =

Species of beetle

Cephalota vartianorum is a species of tiger beetle. This species is found in Israel/Palestine, Jordan, Syria, Iraq, Saudi Arabia, Yemen and Iran. It is found in saline habitats, as well as salt crusts in summer.

== Taxonomy ==
The species was formerly treated as a subspecies of Cephalota zarudniana, but was elevated to full species rank by Jorg Gebert in 2016.
