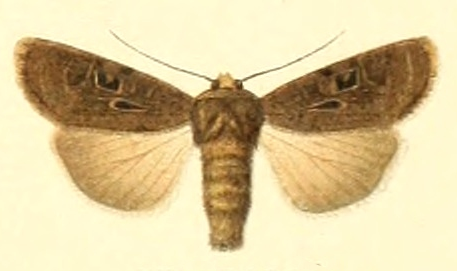
- Illustration from The Macrolepidoptera of the World
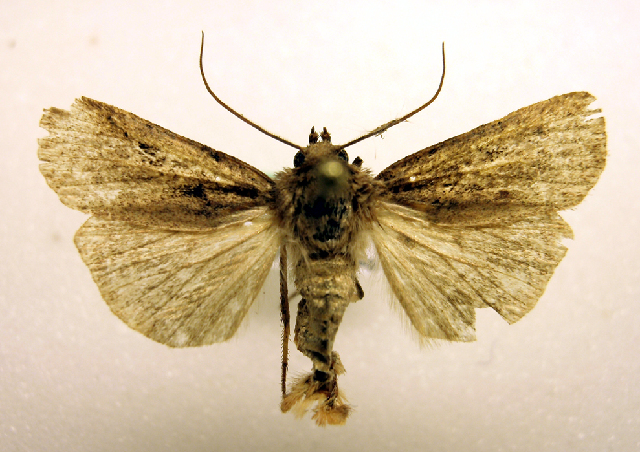
- Chersotis andereggii. Mounted specimen

Scientific classification
- Kingdom: Animalia
- Phylum: Arthropoda
- Class: Insecta
- Order: Lepidoptera
- Superfamily: Noctuoidea
- Family: Noctuidae
- Genus: Chersotis
- Species: C. andereggii

Binomial name
- Chersotis andereggii (Boisduval, [1837])

Synonyms
- Agrotis andereggii Boisduval, [1837]; Euxoa andereggii (Boisduval, [1837]); Agrotis exclamans Eversmann, 1841

= Chersotis andereggii =

Species of moth

Chersotis andereggii is a moth of the family Noctuidae.

== Subspecies ==
- Chersotis andereggii andereggi (Alps)
- Chersotis andereggii arcana (southern Finland, northern Estonia)
- Chersotis andereggii subtilis (Himalayas (Ladakh))

== Description ==
Chersotis andereggii has a wingspan of 29–32 mm. These relatively small moths are generally greyish-brown, with large dark orbicular and claviform markings. Warren states ab. andereggii Boisd. of R. rectangula is darker, without the grey irroration, the lines not showing paler.

== Biology ==
Adults are on wing from the end of July to the first half of August. The larvae feed on Lychnis, Melilotus and Trifolium species.

== Distribution ==
This species can be found in Europe (Bulgaria, East European Russia, Estonia, Finland, France, Greece, Italy, Switzerland), in the southern Urals, Turkey, north-western Iran, Transcaucasia, Turkmenistan, Azerbaijan, Kirghizia, the Altai Mountains, the Sayan Mountains, Baikal, Kamchatka, Mongolia, the Himalaya, the Alps.

== Habitat ==
These moths live in alpine meadows and steppe slopes.

== Bibliography ==
- Erstbeschreibung: BOISDUVAL („1834“): Icones historique des lépidoptères d'Europe nouveaux ou peu connus 2: 1–192, pl. 47–84. Paris (Roret).
- COWAN, C. F. (1970): Boisduval's Icones Historiques des Lépidoptères d'Europe "1832" [-1841]. — Journal of the Society for the Bibliography of Natural History 5 (4): 291–302
- HUEMER, P. (2013): Die Schmetterlinge Österreichs (Lepidoptera). Systematische und faunistische Checkliste. – 304 S. (Studiohefte 12); Innsbruck (Tiroler Landesmuseen-Betriebsgesellschaft m.b.H.).
