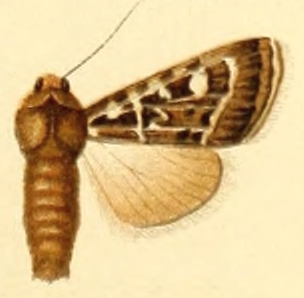

Scientific classification
- Kingdom: Animalia
- Phylum: Arthropoda
- Class: Insecta
- Order: Lepidoptera
- Superfamily: Noctuoidea
- Family: Noctuidae
- Genus: Chersotis
- Species: C. larixia

Binomial name
- Chersotis larixia (Guenée, 1852)

Synonyms
- Agrotis larixia Guenée, 1852; Rhyacia larixia (Guenée, 1852)

= Chersotis larixia =

Species of moth

Chersotis larixia is a moth of the family Noctuidae. It is found in Spain, France, Switzerland, Italy and Sicily, Crete, Turkey, and east to Armenia, Azerbaijan, Syria, Iran, Lebanon, and Turkmenistan. In Europe, it is found in mountainous regions, like the Pyrenees, the Alps, and the Maritime Alps, up to heights of 2,000 meters.

== Description ==
The wingspan is about 38 mm. Warren (1914) states R larixia Guen. Like elegans Ev. but with all the markings, as it were, blurred and unconcise; slightly larger in size and occurring always at a higher elevation than that species, in Europe it is found in the Alps of S. France and N. Italy : and in the Mts. of Armenia, Persia, and W. Turkestan in Asia.

== Subspecies ==
- Chersotis larixia asiatica (Schwingenschuss, 1938) (Crete, Turkey, Iran)
- Chersotis larixia larixia (Guenée, 1852) (south-western Europe)
- Chersotis larixia erebina Boursin, 1940 (Azerbaijan, Iran, Russia)

== Biology ==
Adults are on wing from June to August.

The larvae feed on various low-growing plants.
