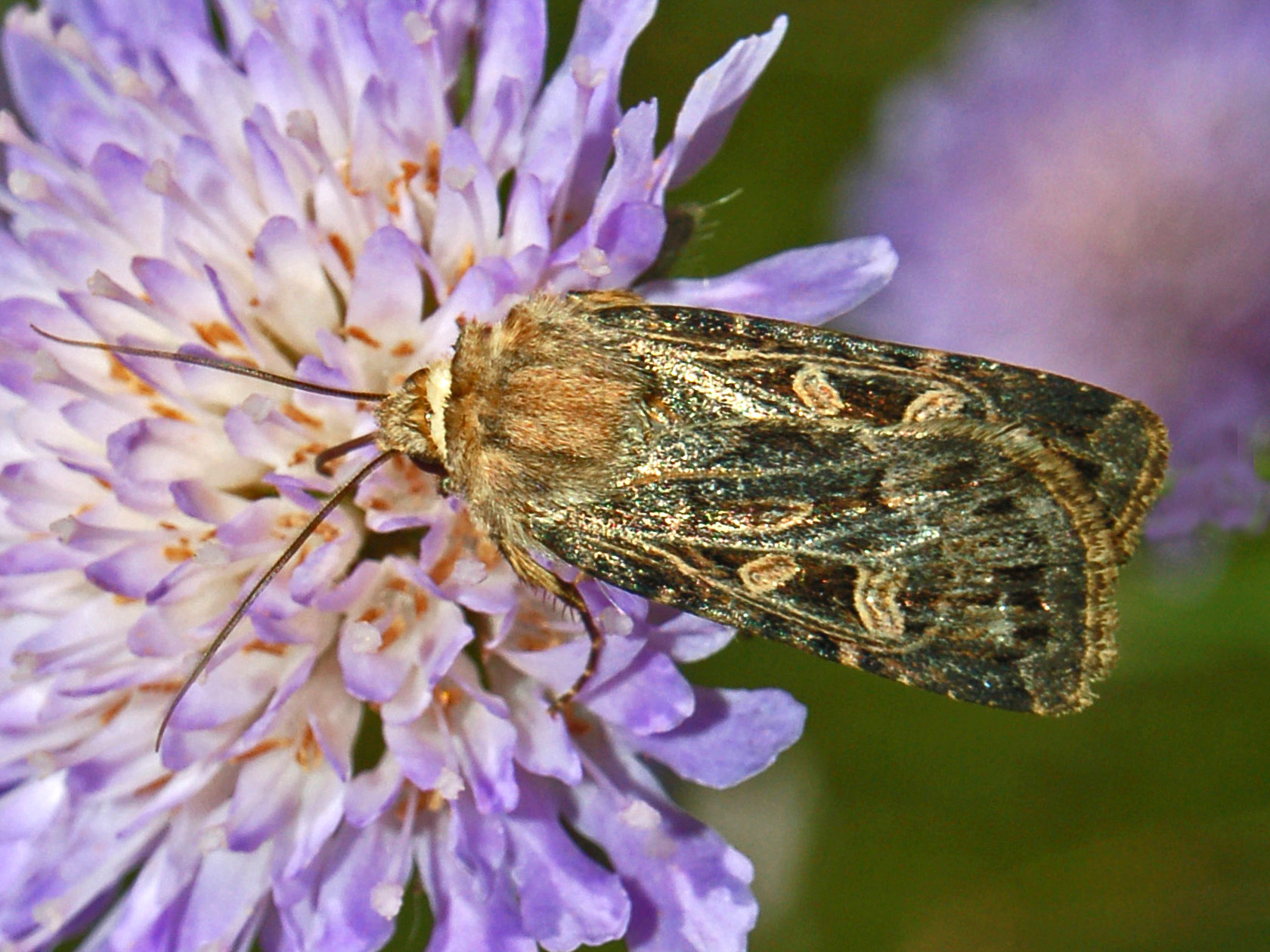

Scientific classification
- Domain: Eukaryota
- Kingdom: Animalia
- Phylum: Arthropoda
- Class: Insecta
- Order: Lepidoptera
- Superfamily: Noctuoidea
- Family: Noctuidae
- Genus: Chersotis
- Species: C. oreina

Binomial name
- Chersotis oreina Dufay, 1984

= Chersotis oreina =

Species of moth

Chersotis oreina is a moth of the family Noctuidae. It is found in Western Alps (France, Switzerland and Italy) and in Pyrenees (Spain), at about 2000 m. a.s.l. It is very similar to Chersotis alpestris, but this species has no tuft of black hair at the base of the abdomen and the upper dots on the wings are elliptical or rectangular, while in C. alpestris they are round. The wingspan is about 30 mm. The moth flies from July to September.
