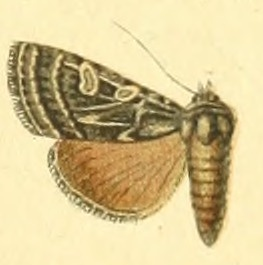

Scientific classification
- Kingdom: Animalia
- Phylum: Arthropoda
- Class: Insecta
- Order: Lepidoptera
- Superfamily: Noctuoidea
- Family: Noctuidae
- Genus: Chersotis
- Species: C. poliogramma

Binomial name
- Chersotis poliogramma (Hampson, 1903)

Synonyms
- Agrotis poliogramma Hampson, 1903; Euxoa poliogramma (Hampson, 1903)

= Chersotis poliogramma =

Species of moth

Chersotis poliogramma is a moth of the family Noctuidae. It is found in Kashmir.
