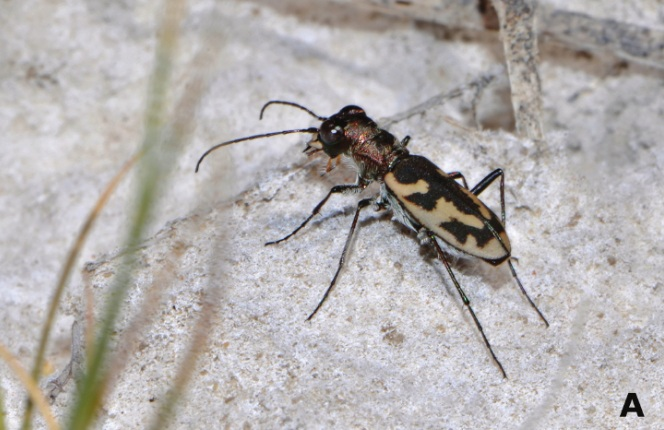

Scientific classification
- Kingdom: Animalia
- Phylum: Arthropoda
- Class: Insecta
- Order: Coleoptera
- Suborder: Adephaga
- Family: Cicindelidae
- Genus: Cephalota
- Species: C. dulcinea

Binomial name
- Cephalota dulcinea Lopez, de la Rosa & Baena, 2006

= Cephalota dulcinea =

Species of beetle

Cephalota dulcinea is a species of tiger beetle. This species is found in Spain.

Researchers have observed its preying behaviour towards ants, other small hymenopterans, and small dipterans. Some specimens seem to keep a hunting spot for a period, as suggested by the insect remains scattered around them.
