= Cephalota hispanica =

Scientific classification
- Kingdom: Animalia
- Phylum: Arthropoda
- Class: Insecta
- Order: Coleoptera
- Suborder: Adephaga
- Family: Cicindelidae
- Genus: Cephalota
- Species: C. hispanica

Binomial name
- Cephalota hispanica (Gory, 1833)

Synonyms
- Cicindela hispanica Gory, 1833; Cicindela viatica Klug, 1834

Species of beetle

Cephalota hispanica is a species of tiger beetle. This species is found in Portugal and Spain.
