= Cephalota turcosinensis =

Scientific classification
- Kingdom: Animalia
- Phylum: Arthropoda
- Clade: Pancrustacea
- Class: Insecta
- Order: Coleoptera
- Suborder: Adephaga
- Family: Cicindelidae
- Genus: Cephalota
- Species: C. turcosinensis

Binomial name
- Cephalota turcosinensis (Mandl, 1938)

Synonyms
- Cicindela turcosinensis Mandl, 1938

Species of beetle

Cephalota turcosinensis, the northwest China tiger beetle, is a species of tiger beetle. This species is found in China (Xinjiang).
