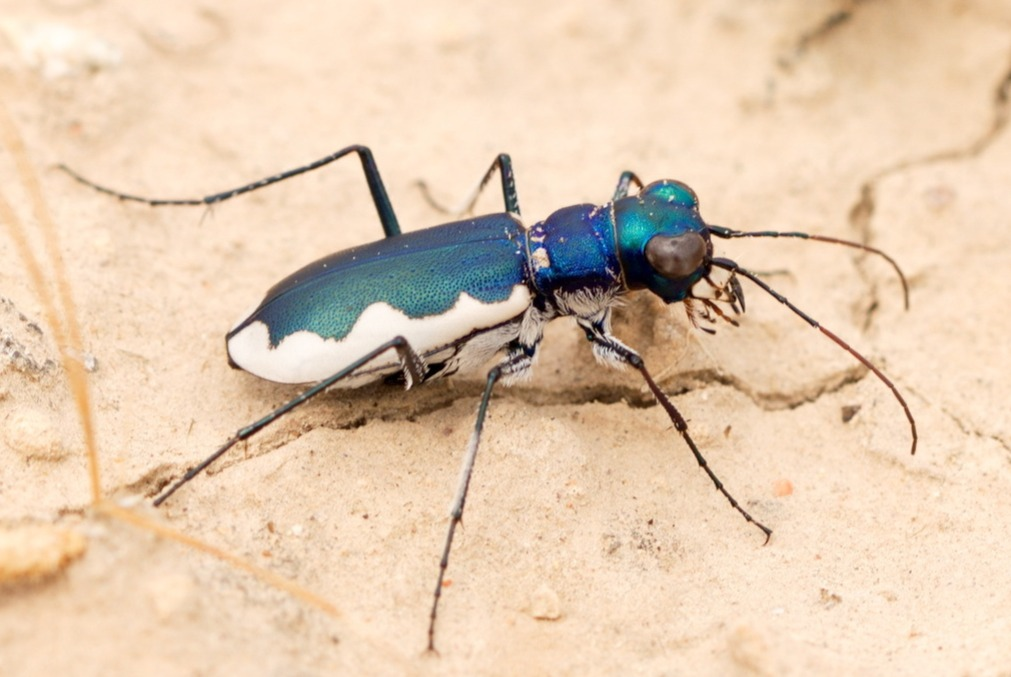
- Tiger beetle Cephalota galathea in Fergana Valley, Uzbekistan

Scientific classification
- Kingdom: Animalia
- Phylum: Arthropoda
- Clade: Pancrustacea
- Class: Insecta
- Order: Coleoptera
- Suborder: Adephaga
- Family: Cicindelidae
- Genus: Cephalota
- Species: C. galathea

Binomial name
- Cephalota galathea (Thieme, 1881)

Synonyms
- Cicindela galathea Thieme, 1881; Cicindela ramosa Beuthin, 1894; Cicindela viridescens Beuthin, 1894

= Cephalota galathea =

Species of beetle

Cephalota galathea is a species of tiger beetle. This species is found in Uzbekistan and Tadzhikistan.
