= Cephalota deserticoloides =

Scientific classification
- Kingdom: Animalia
- Phylum: Arthropoda
- Class: Insecta
- Order: Coleoptera
- Suborder: Adephaga
- Family: Cicindelidae
- Genus: Cephalota
- Species: C. deserticoloides

Binomial name
- Cephalota deserticoloides (Codina, 1931)

Synonyms
- Cicindela deserticoloides Codina, 1931

Species of beetle

Cephalota deserticoloides is a species of tiger beetle. This species is found in Spain, where it has only been recorded from a few sites in south-eastern Iberia. The habitat consists of arid saline steppe.
