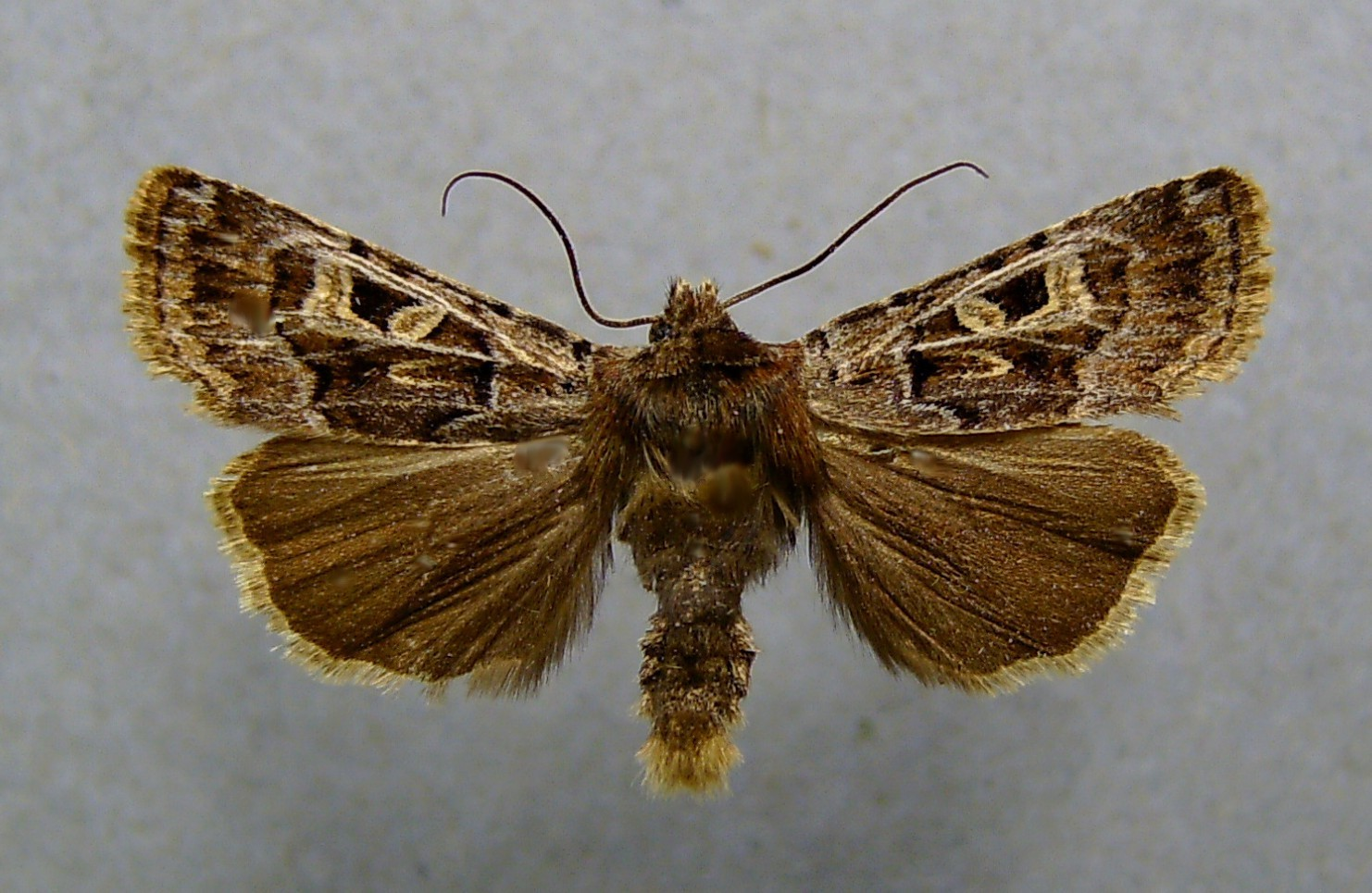

Scientific classification
- Kingdom: Animalia
- Phylum: Arthropoda
- Class: Insecta
- Order: Lepidoptera
- Superfamily: Noctuoidea
- Family: Noctuidae
- Genus: Chersotis
- Species: C. ocellina

Binomial name
- Chersotis ocellina Denis & Schiffermüller, 1775

Synonyms
- Noctua ocellina; Agrotis ocellina; Rhyacia ocellina

= Chersotis ocellina =

Species of moth

Chersotis ocellina is a moth of the family Noctuidae. It is found in the mountainous areas of Europe, especially in the Alps (on heights between 1,500 and 2,500 meters), the Apennine Mountains, Pyrenees, Arseniyadin and the Cantabrian mountains.

== Description ==
R. ocellina Schiff. (— phyteuma Esp.) (Ilk). The forewing is dark brown with more or less of a red tinge: the veins are pale to the outer line; the stigmata are pale, the upper with dark centres; the orbicular stigma is small and round or oval; the reniform is angled inwards along the median vein to touch the orbicular; the cell is black; the hind wings are brown. R. ocellina is a relatively small species (its wingspan is 25–28 mm.) occurring in the Mountains of Europe, Western Asia, and North and Central Asia. — The form transiens Stgr. [now species Chersotis transiens Staudinger, 1896), which is found in Central Asia only, is paler and approaches Chersotis alpestris. The larvae are brown; the dorsal line is pale; the lateral lines are pale and inwardly brown-bordered, and the whole dorsal field between them is darker; the spiracles are brown, each with two pale-ringed black tubercles above them; the head and anal plate are brown; the thoracic plate is black with three yellow streaks; the larvae live on various low plants.

== Biology ==
The moth flies from July to August in one generation.

The larvae feed on various herbaceous plants.

== Subspecies ==
There are two recognised subspecies:

- Chersotis ocellina ocellina
- Chersotis ocellina pyrenaellina (Pyrenees)
