= Cephalota kutshumi =

Scientific classification
- Kingdom: Animalia
- Phylum: Arthropoda
- Class: Insecta
- Order: Coleoptera
- Suborder: Adephaga
- Family: Cicindelidae
- Genus: Cephalota
- Species: C. kutshumi

Binomial name
- Cephalota kutshumi (Putchkov, 1993)

Synonyms
- Cicindela kutshumi Putchkov, 1993

Species of beetle

Cephalota kutshumi is a species of tiger beetle found in Kazakhstan.

The species was first described in 1993 by Ukrainian entomologist Alexander Vasilievich Putchkov as Cicindela (Cephalota) kutshumi.
