= Cephalota deserticola =

Scientific classification
- Kingdom: Animalia
- Phylum: Arthropoda
- Class: Insecta
- Order: Coleoptera
- Suborder: Adephaga
- Family: Cicindelidae
- Genus: Cephalota
- Species: C. deserticola

Binomial name
- Cephalota deserticola (Faldermann, 1836)

Synonyms
- Cicindela deserticola Faldermann, 1836; Cicindela albonubila Tschitscherine, 1903; Cicindela ordinata Jakovlev, 1884

Species of beetle

Cephalota deserticola is a species of tiger beetle that can be found in Afghanistan, Armenia, Iran, Russia, Ukraine, Central Asia, and northern part of China. The species is green coloured and is 11 millimetres (0.43 in) in length

== Subspecies ==
- Cephalota deserticola deserticola (Turkey, Iran, Armenia, Azerbaijan, Kazakhstan, Uzbekistan, Turkmenistan, Kyrgyzstan, Tadzhikistan, Afghanistan, China, Pakistan, Russia, Mongolia)
- Cephalota deserticola sivashensis Danilevsky, 2001 (Ukraine)
