= Cephalota hajdajorum =

Scientific classification
- Kingdom: Animalia
- Phylum: Arthropoda
- Class: Insecta
- Order: Coleoptera
- Suborder: Adephaga
- Family: Cicindelidae
- Genus: Cephalota
- Species: C. hajdajorum

Binomial name
- Cephalota hajdajorum Gebert, 2016

Species of beetle

Cephalota hajdajorum is a species of tiger beetle. This species is found in eastern Turkey and northwestern Iran.
