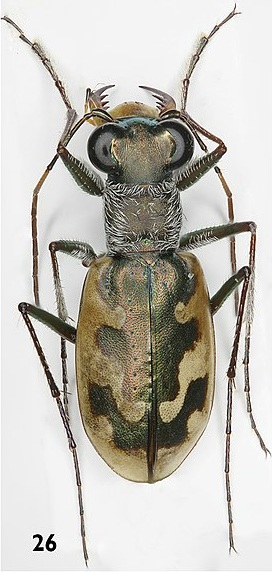

Scientific classification
- Kingdom: Animalia
- Phylum: Arthropoda
- Class: Insecta
- Order: Coleoptera
- Suborder: Adephaga
- Family: Cicindelidae
- Genus: Cephalota
- Species: C. tibialis

Binomial name
- Cephalota tibialis (Dejean, 1822)

Synonyms
- Cicindela tibialis Dejean, 1822; Cicindela barthelemyi Gory, 1838; Cicindela connata Beuthin, 1894; Cicindela impunctata Beuthin, 1894; Cicindela interruptolimbata Dupuis, 1910; Cicindela latreillei Dejean, 1831; Cicindela modesta Beuthin, 1894; Cicindela normandi Bedel, 1898; Cicindela virescens Beuthin, 1894; Cephalota zarga Kamoun, 1988; Cicindela longipes Dejean, 1822

= Cephalota tibialis =

Species of beetle

Cephalota tibialis is a species of tiger beetle. This species is found in Tunisia, Libya, Egypt, Israel/Palestine and Cyprus. Its habitat consists of the shores of salt lakes, as well as sandy beaches.

== Subspecies ==
- Cephalota tibialis tibialis (Egypt, Israel/Palestine)
- Cephalota tibialis lyonii (Vigors, 1825) (Tunisia, Libya)
- Cephalota tibialis nuessleri Gebert, 1991 (Cyprus)
