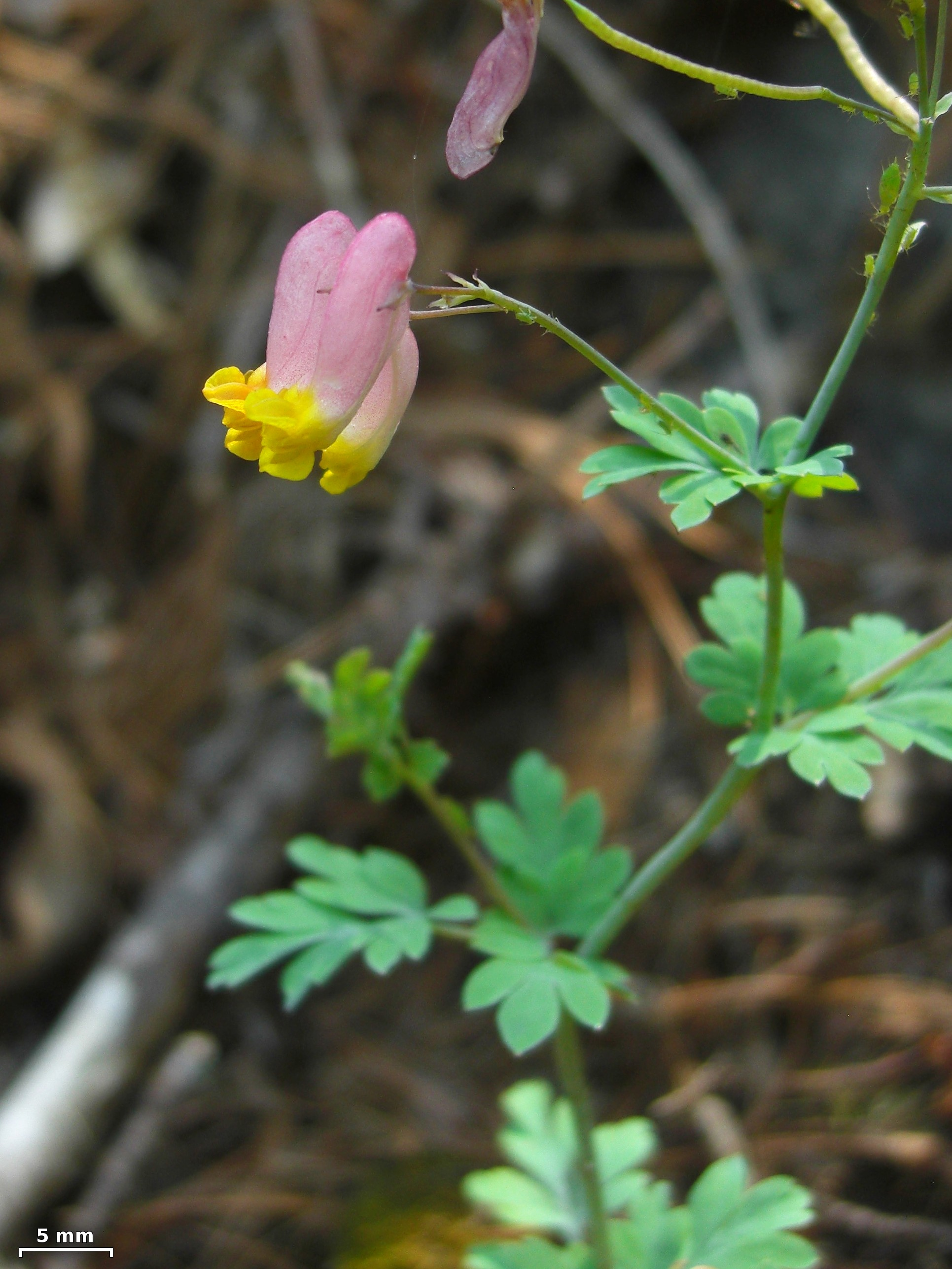
- Great Smoky Mountains, North Carolina

Conservation status
- Secure (NatureServe)

Scientific classification
- Kingdom: Plantae
- Clade: Embryophytes
- Clade: Tracheophytes
- Clade: Angiosperms
- Clade: Eudicots
- Order: Ranunculales
- Family: Papaveraceae
- Subfamily: Fumarioideae
- Tribe: Fumarieae
- Subtribe: Corydalinae
- Genus: Capnoides; Mill.
- Species: C. sempervirens

Binomial name
- Capnoides sempervirens (L.) Borkh. (1797)

Synonyms
- Corydalis glauca Pursh; Corydalis sempervirens (L.) Pers. Fumaria sempervirens L.

= Capnoides =

Pink corydalis

Monotypic genus of flowering plant in the poppy family

Capnoides sempervirens, the harlequin corydalis, rock harlequin, pale corydalis or pink corydalis, is an annual or biennial plant native to rocky woodland and burned or disturbed places in northern North America. Capnoides sempervirens is the only species in the monotypic genus Capnoides.

Name(s) brought to synonymy

- Capnoides elegans Kuntze, a synonym for Corydalis elegans

== Description ==
Plants are 20–80 cm (7.9–31.5 in) tall. Both stems and leaves are glaucous. Leaves are 1–3 cm (0.39–1.18 in) in length, twice pinnately divided, usually segmented into 3 lobes and sometimes 4. Flowers are tubular, pink with a yellow tip, 1–1.7 cm (0.39–0.67 in) long, grouped into dangling clusters. Seeds are black and shiny, about 1 mm (0.039 in) wide, held tightly together in long thin cylindrical pods.

Flowers bloom from May to September. Often growing out of areas disturbed by fire. Native from Newfoundland to Alaska and south into the eastern United States.

== Gallery ==
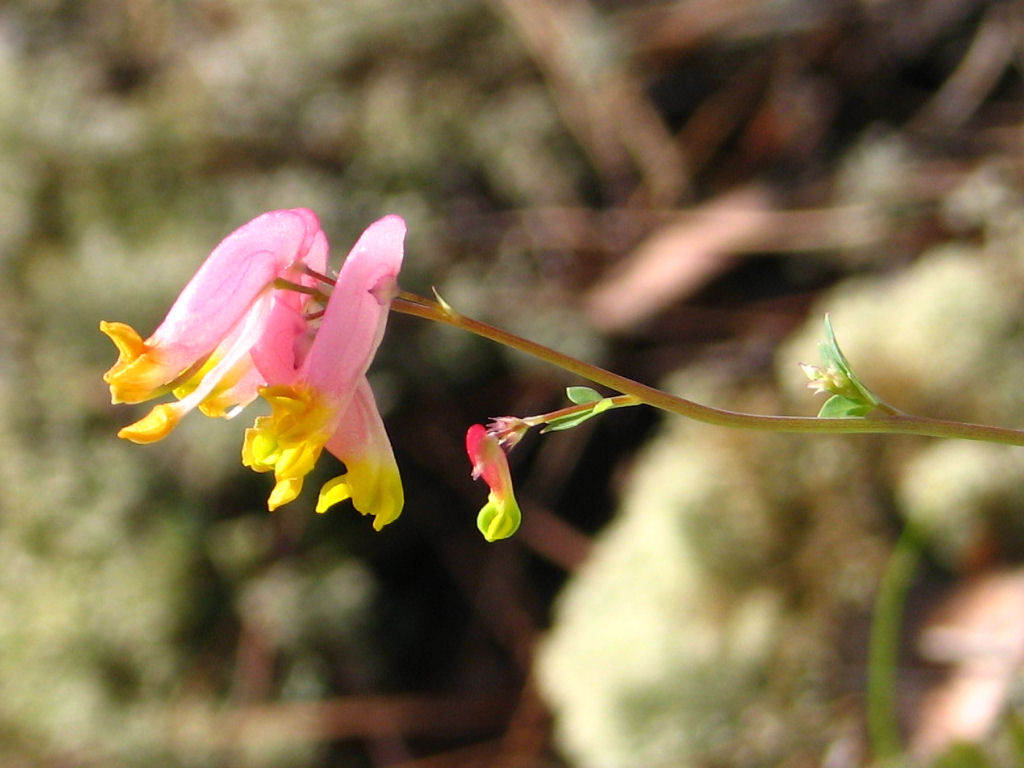
Quetico Provincial Park, Ontario

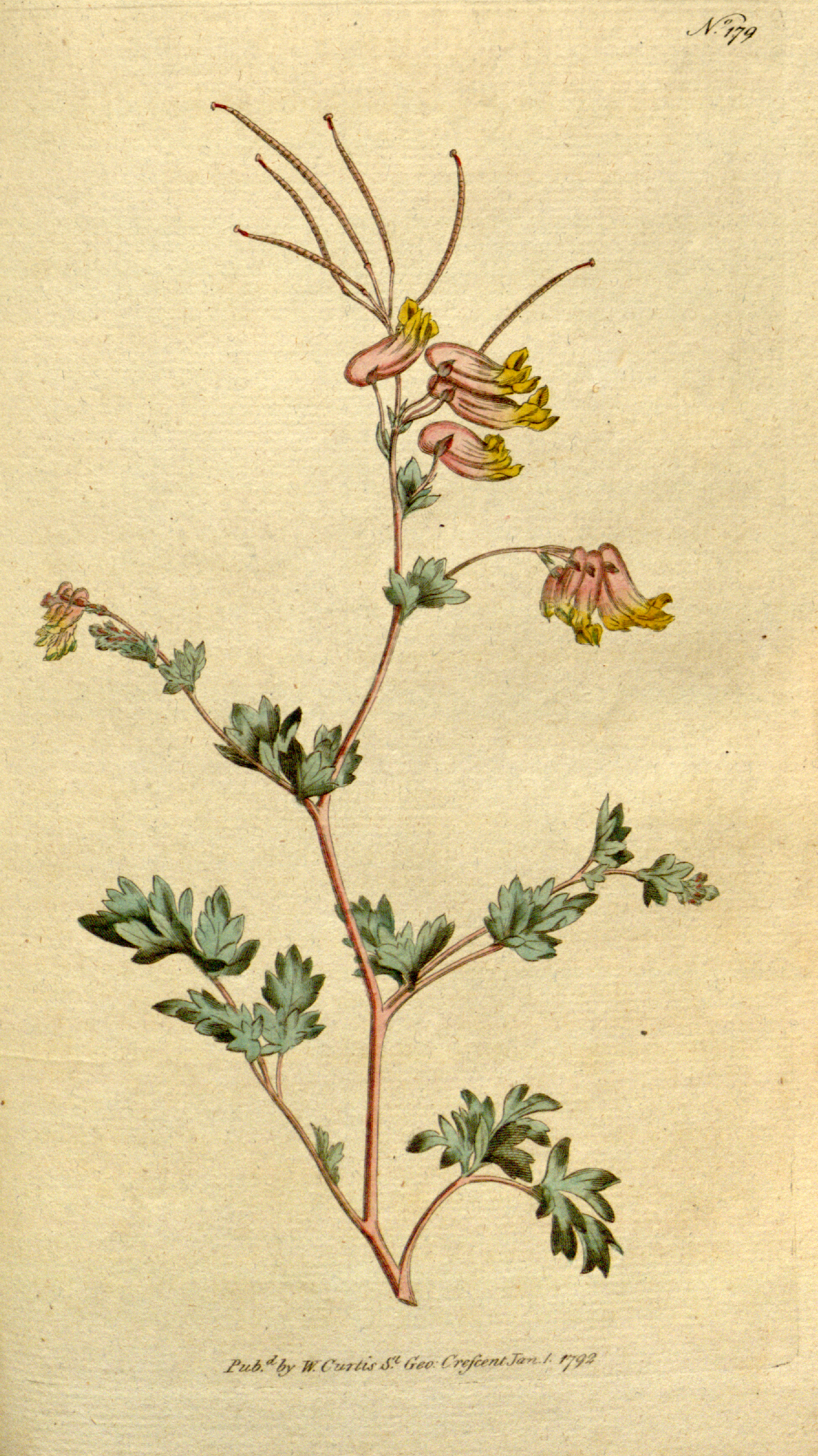
Illustration from The Botanical Magazine Vol. 5, 1792 (as Fumaria glauca)
