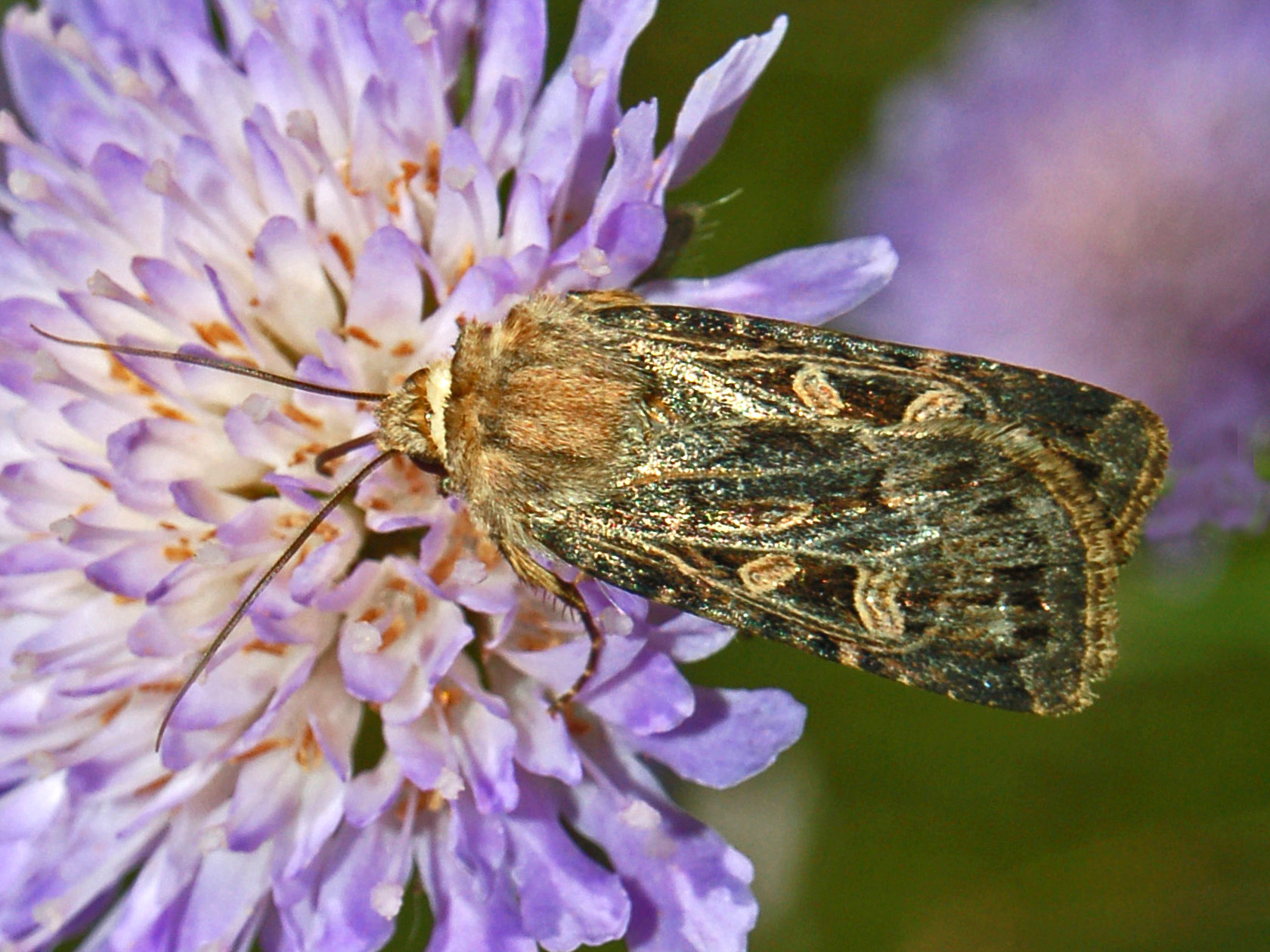
- Chersotis oreina

Scientific classification
- Domain: Eukaryota
- Kingdom: Animalia
- Phylum: Arthropoda
- Class: Insecta
- Order: Lepidoptera
- Superfamily: Noctuoidea
- Family: Noctuidae
- Subtribe: Noctuina
- Genus: Chersotis; Boisduval, 1840

= Chersotis =

Genus of moths

Chersotis is a genus of moths of the family Noctuidae.

== Species ==
- Chersotis acutangula Staudinger, 1892
- Chersotis alpestris [Schiffermüller], 1775
- Chersotis anatolica Draudt, 1936
- Chersotis andereggii Boisduval, [1837]
- Chersotis capnistis Lederer, 1871
- Chersotis cuprea [Schiffermüller], 1775
- Chersotis cyrnea Spuler, 1908
- Chersotis deplana Freyer, 1831
- Chersotis deplanata Eversmann, 1843
- Chersotis eberti Dufay & Varga, 1995
- Chersotis ebertorum Koçak, 1980
- Chersotis elegans Eversmann, 1837
- Chersotis fimbriola Esper, [1803]
- Chersotis gratissima Corti, 1932
- Chersotis juncta Grote, 1878
- Chersotis kacem Le Cerf, 1933
- Chersotis laeta Rebel, 1904
- Chersotis larixia Guenée, 1852
- Chersotis margaritacea Villers, 1789
- Chersotis multangula Hübner, [1803]
- Chersotis ocellina [Schiffermüller], 1775
- Chersotis oreina Dufay, 1984
- Chersotis poliogramma (Hampson, 1903)
- Chersotis rectangula [Schiffermüller], 1775
- Chersotis sordescens Staudinger, 1900
- Chersotis transiens Staudinger, 1896
- Chersotis vicina Corti, 1930
- Chersotis zukowskyi Draudt, 1936
