= Chersotis juncta =

Scientific classification
- Kingdom: Animalia
- Phylum: Arthropoda
- Class: Insecta
- Order: Lepidoptera
- Superfamily: Noctuoidea
- Family: Noctuidae
- Tribe: Noctuini
- Subtribe: Noctuina
- Genus: Chersotis
- Species: C. juncta

Binomial name
- Chersotis juncta (Grote, 1878)

Synonyms
- Chersotis juncta patefacta (Smith, 1895)

Species of moth

Chersotis juncta, known generally as the stirrup dart moth or spear dart moth, is a species of cutworm or dart moth in the family Noctuidae. It is found in Europe and Northern Asia (excluding China) and North America.

The MONA or Hodges number for Chersotis juncta is 11003.
