= Cephalota luctuosa =

Scientific classification
- Kingdom: Animalia
- Phylum: Arthropoda
- Class: Insecta
- Order: Coleoptera
- Suborder: Adephaga
- Family: Cicindelidae
- Genus: Cephalota
- Species: C. luctuosa

Binomial name
- Cephalota luctuosa (Dejean, 1831)

Synonyms
- Cicindela luctuosa Dejean, 1831; Cicindela spinuligera Antoine, 1951

Species of beetle

Cephalota luctuosa is a species of tiger beetle. This species is found in Morocco, and Spain. The habitat consists of salt marshes.
