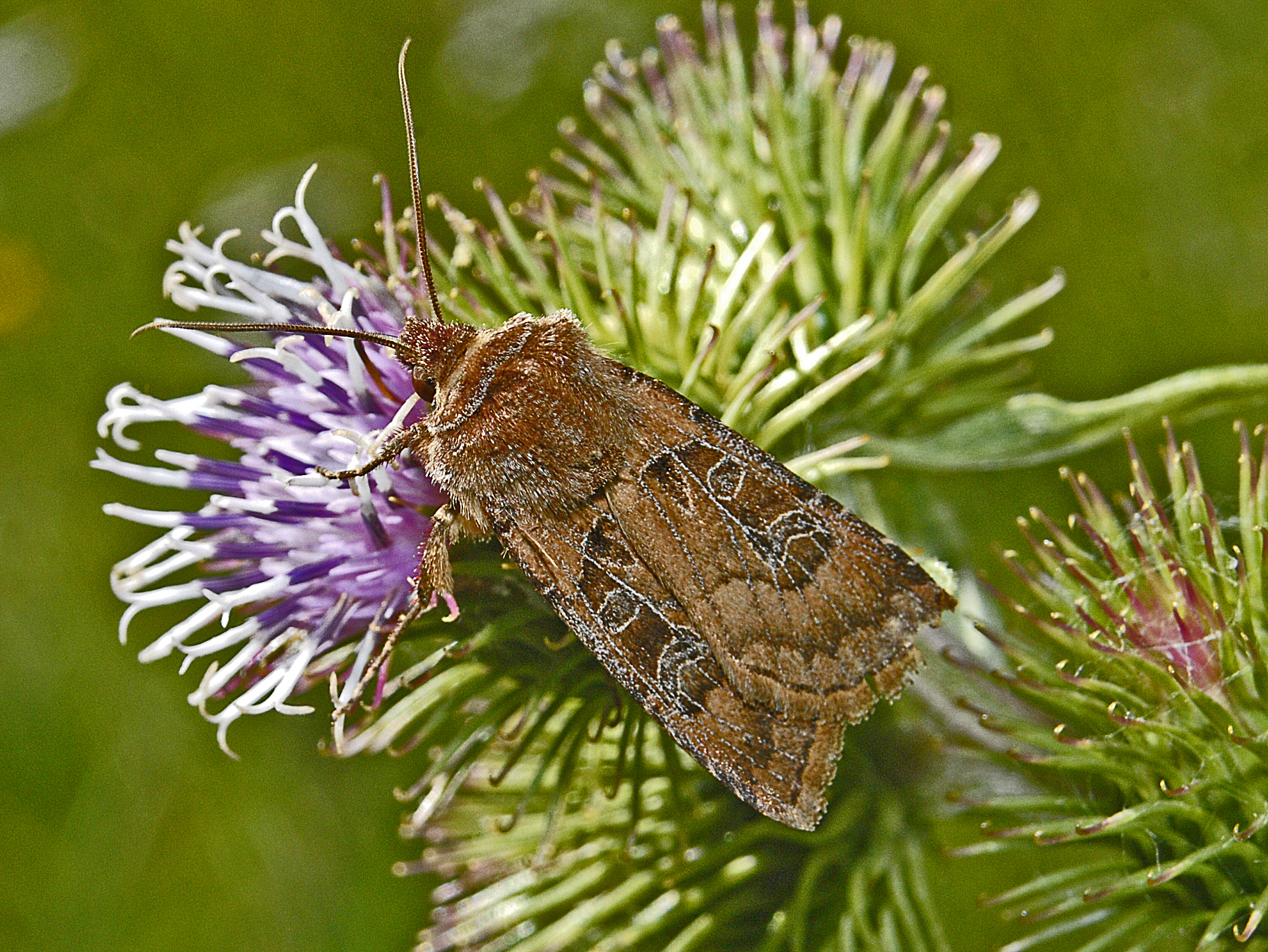

Scientific classification
- Domain: Eukaryota
- Kingdom: Animalia
- Phylum: Arthropoda
- Class: Insecta
- Order: Lepidoptera
- Superfamily: Noctuoidea
- Family: Noctuidae
- Genus: Chersotis
- Species: C. cuprea

Binomial name
- Chersotis cuprea Denis & Schiffermüller, 1775

Synonyms
- Noctua cuprea; Rhyacia cuprea; Agrotis cuprea

= Chersotis cuprea =

Species of moth

Chersotis cuprea is a moth of the family Noctuidae.

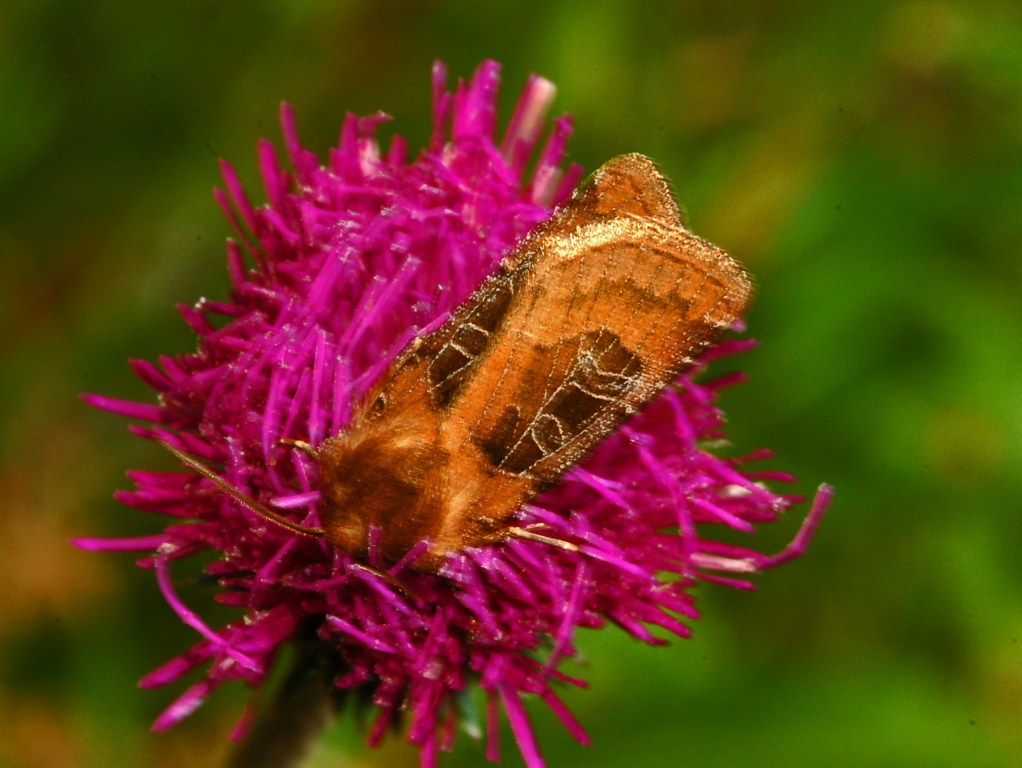
Chersotis cuprea

== Subspecies ==
There are three recognised subspecies:

- Chersotis cuprea cuprea
- Chersotis cuprea japonica (Japan)
- Chersotis cuprea schaeferi (Eastern Tibet)

== Description ==
Adult males have a wingspan of 32–36 millimetres (1.3–1.4 in); adult females have a wingspan of 33–39 millimetres (1.3–1.5 in). This species shows a high variability in the basic colors. Usually, the upper side of the forewings is coppery reddish brown (hence the Latin name cuprea) with dark brown markings that have a thin whitish border. The underside of the forewing is dark gray-brown. The hind wings are monochrome gray-brown. Caterpillars are gray-brown, with dark dorsal markings and bright side stripes. Warren (1914) states R. cuprea Schiff. (= haematitedea Esp.) that the forewing is a dull brown; the median area below the subcostal vein is dark brown; the veins and edges of stigmata are very finely pale; the stigmata are a deep brown; the costa is dark with fine pale speckling and a dark shade before the submarginal line; the hindwing is gray-brown with a yellowish fringe. The species in found in Northern Europe (excluding Britain), Armenia, and Kamschatka. The larvae are dull brown, with 3 whitish dorsal lines, some oblique black subdorsal streaks, and a grey lateral line; The larvae live on various low plants.

== Biology ==
The moth flies from July to September depending on the location. The larvae feed on Vaccinium myrtillus, on Asteraceae (Centaurea or Taraxacum) and on other plants.

== Distribution ==
This species can be found in Northern Europe, the Pyrenees, Central Europe down to Greece and east through Ukraine, Siberia, Turkey, the Caucasus and Armenia, up to China and Japan.

== Habitat ==
These moths live in forests and in mountain forests, in nutrient-poor grasslands and especially in partly humid alpine pastures.

== Bibliography ==
- Michael Fibiger: Noctuinae II. - Noctuidae Europaeae, Volume 2. Entomological Press, Sorø, 1993, ISBN 87-89430-02-6
- Erstbeschreibung: (1775): Ankündung eines systematischen Werkes von den Schmetterlingen der Wienergegend herausgegeben von einigen Lehrern am k. k. Theresianum. 1-323, pl. I a+b, Frontispiz. Wien (Augustin Bernardi).
- LepIndex: The Global Lepidoptera Names Index. Beccaloni G.W., Scoble M.J., Robinson G.S. & Pitkin B.
- Manfred Koch: Wir bestimmen. Schmetterlinge. Band 3. Eulen. Neumann Verlag Radebeul 2. Auflage 1972
- Hochspringen Bundesamt für Naturschutz (Hrsg.): Rote Liste gefährdeter Tiere Deutschlands. Landwirtschaftsverlag, Münster 1998, ISBN 3-89624-110-9
