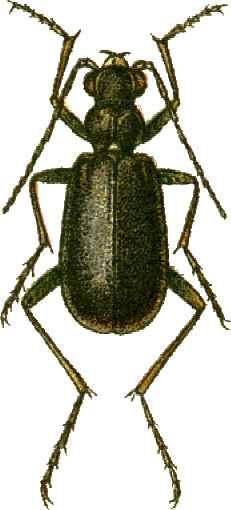

Scientific classification
- Kingdom: Animalia
- Phylum: Arthropoda
- Class: Insecta
- Order: Coleoptera
- Suborder: Adephaga
- Family: Cicindelidae
- Genus: Cephalota
- Species: C. atrata

Binomial name
- Cephalota atrata (Pallas, 1776)

Synonyms
- Cicindela atrata Pallas, 1776; Cicindela albomarginata Beuthin, 1890; Cicindela bipunctata Kraatz, 1890; Cicindela confluens Kraatz, 1890; Cicindela conjuncta Kraatz, 1890; Cicindela distans Fischer von Waldheim, 1820; Cicindela infuscata Pallas, 1798; Cicindela lacteola Fischer von Waldheim, 1822; Cicindela marginata Kraatz, 1890; Cicindela nigra Motschulsky, 1850; Cicindela subvittata Kraatz, 1890; Cicindela zwickii Fischer von Waldheim, 1820

= Cephalota atrata =

Species of beetle

Cephalota atrata is a species of tiger beetle. This species is found in Ukraine, Kazakhstan and Russia.
