= Chersotis capnistis =

Scientific classification
- Domain: Eukaryota
- Kingdom: Animalia
- Phylum: Arthropoda
- Class: Insecta
- Order: Lepidoptera
- Superfamily: Noctuoidea
- Family: Noctuidae
- Genus: Chersotis
- Species: C. capnistis

Binomial name
- Chersotis capnistis (Lederer, 1872)

Synonyms
- Agrotis capnistis Lederer, [1870]; Agrotis neara Püngeler, 1906; Agrotis glabripennis Corti, 1926; Agrotis guberlae Corti, 1930

Species of moth

Chersotis capnistis is a moth of the family Noctuidae. It is found in most parts of the Near East and Middle East, west central Asia, eastward to western China and Afghanistan, southward to north and southwest Iran and the Levant.

Adults are on wing from July to October. There is one generation per year.

== Subspecies ==
- Chersotis capnistis capnistis (Turkmenistan)
- Chersotis capnistis neara (Turkmenistan)
- Chersotis capnistis glabripennis (southern Urals)
- Chersotis capnistis schnacki (Greece)
