= Chersotis laeta =

Scientific classification
- Domain: Eukaryota
- Kingdom: Animalia
- Phylum: Arthropoda
- Class: Insecta
- Order: Lepidoptera
- Superfamily: Noctuoidea
- Family: Noctuidae
- Genus: Chersotis
- Species: C. laeta

Binomial name
- Chersotis laeta (Rebel, 1904)

Synonyms
- Agrotis fimbriola var. laeta Rebel, 1904

Species of moth

Chersotis laeta is a moth of the family Noctuidae. It is found in a number of isolated populations from Greece to the Caucasus; Turkey, Lebanon, Israel, and Syria.

Adults are on wing from June to July. There is one generation per year.

== Subspecies ==
- Chersotis laeta laeta (western Turkey, southern Turkey, Lebanon, Syria)
- Chersotis laeta euxina (Pontic Mountains, Caucasus, Armenia, Elburz)
- Chersotis laeta leonhardi (Albania, Bosnia-Herzegovina, Yugoslavia (Macedonia), Greek Macedonia)
- Chersotis laeta achaiana (Greece)
- Chersotis laeta cretica (Crete)
