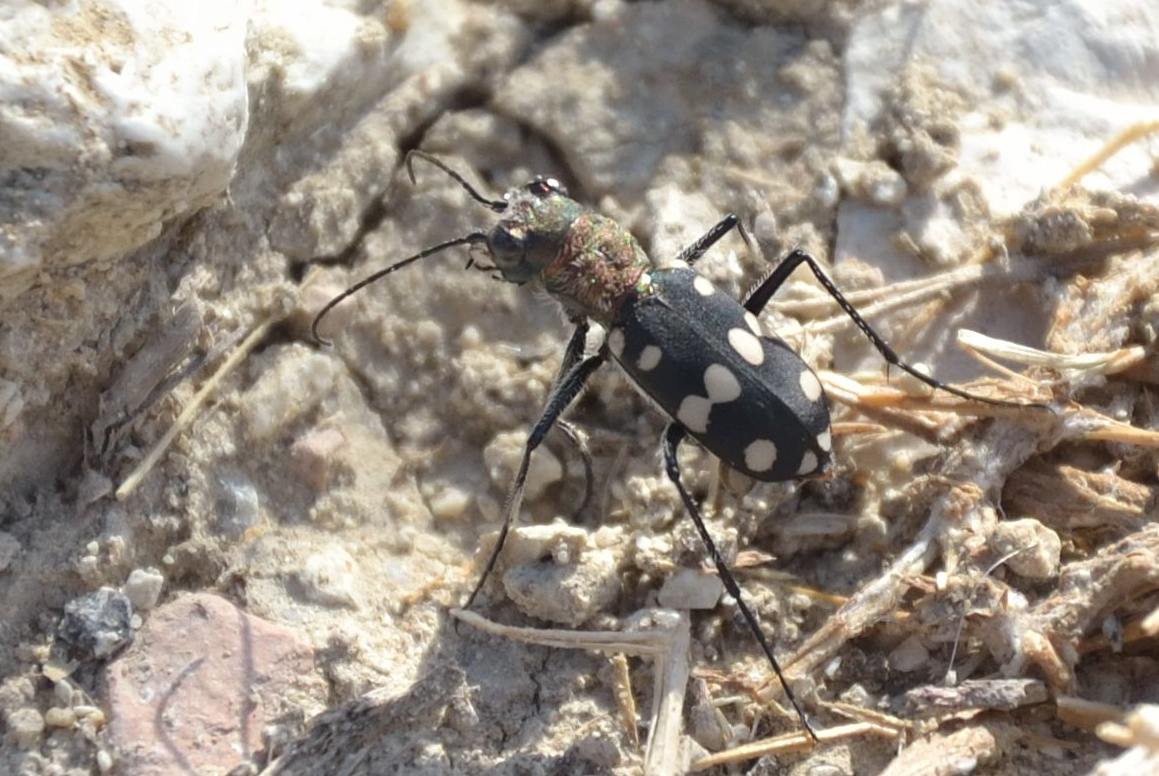

Scientific classification
- Kingdom: Animalia
- Phylum: Arthropoda
- Class: Insecta
- Order: Coleoptera
- Suborder: Adephaga
- Family: Cicindelidae
- Genus: Cephalota
- Species: C. maura

Binomial name
- Cephalota maura (Linnaeus, 1758)

Synonyms
- Cicindela maura Linnaeus, 1758; Cicindela cupreothoracica Korell & Cassola, 1987; Cicindela angulata Beuthin, 1894; Cicindela apicalis Kraatz, 1890; Cicindela arenaria Fabricius, 1792; Cicindela biskrensis Schulz, 1900; Cicindela humeralis Beuthin, 1890; Cicindela marginalis Beuthin, 1894; Cicindela muelleri Beuthin, 1890; Cicindela punctigera Kraatz, 1890; Cicindela recta Kraatz, 1890; Cicindela sexmaculata Beuthin, 1894; Cicindela sicula Gistel, 1837; Cicindela stricta Beuthin, 1894; Cicindela transversalis Beuthin, 1894

= Cephalota maura =

Species of beetle

Cephalota maura is a species of tiger beetle. This species is found in Portugal, Spain, Italy, Morocco, Algeria and Tunisia. The habitat consists of salt marshes and river banks.
