= Cephalota pseudodeserticola =

Scientific classification
- Kingdom: Animalia
- Phylum: Arthropoda
- Class: Insecta
- Order: Coleoptera
- Suborder: Adephaga
- Family: Cicindelidae
- Genus: Cephalota
- Species: C. pseudodeserticola

Binomial name
- Cephalota pseudodeserticola (W. Horn, 1891)

Synonyms
- Cicindela pseudodeserticola W.Horn, 1891; Cicindela deserticola Dokhtouroff, 1887

Species of beetle

Cephalota pseudodeserticola, the false desert tiger beetle, is a species of tiger beetle. This species is found in Kazakhstan, China and Mongolia.
