= Cephalota illecebrosa =

Scientific classification
- Kingdom: Animalia
- Phylum: Arthropoda
- Class: Insecta
- Order: Coleoptera
- Suborder: Adephaga
- Family: Cicindelidae
- Genus: Cephalota
- Species: C. illecebrosa

Binomial name
- Cephalota illecebrosa (Dokhtouroff, 1885)

Synonyms
- Cicindela illecebrosa Dokhtouroff, 1885

Species of beetle

Cephalota illecebrosa is a species of tiger beetle. This species is found in Iran, Turkmenistan, Tadzhikistan and Afghanistan.
