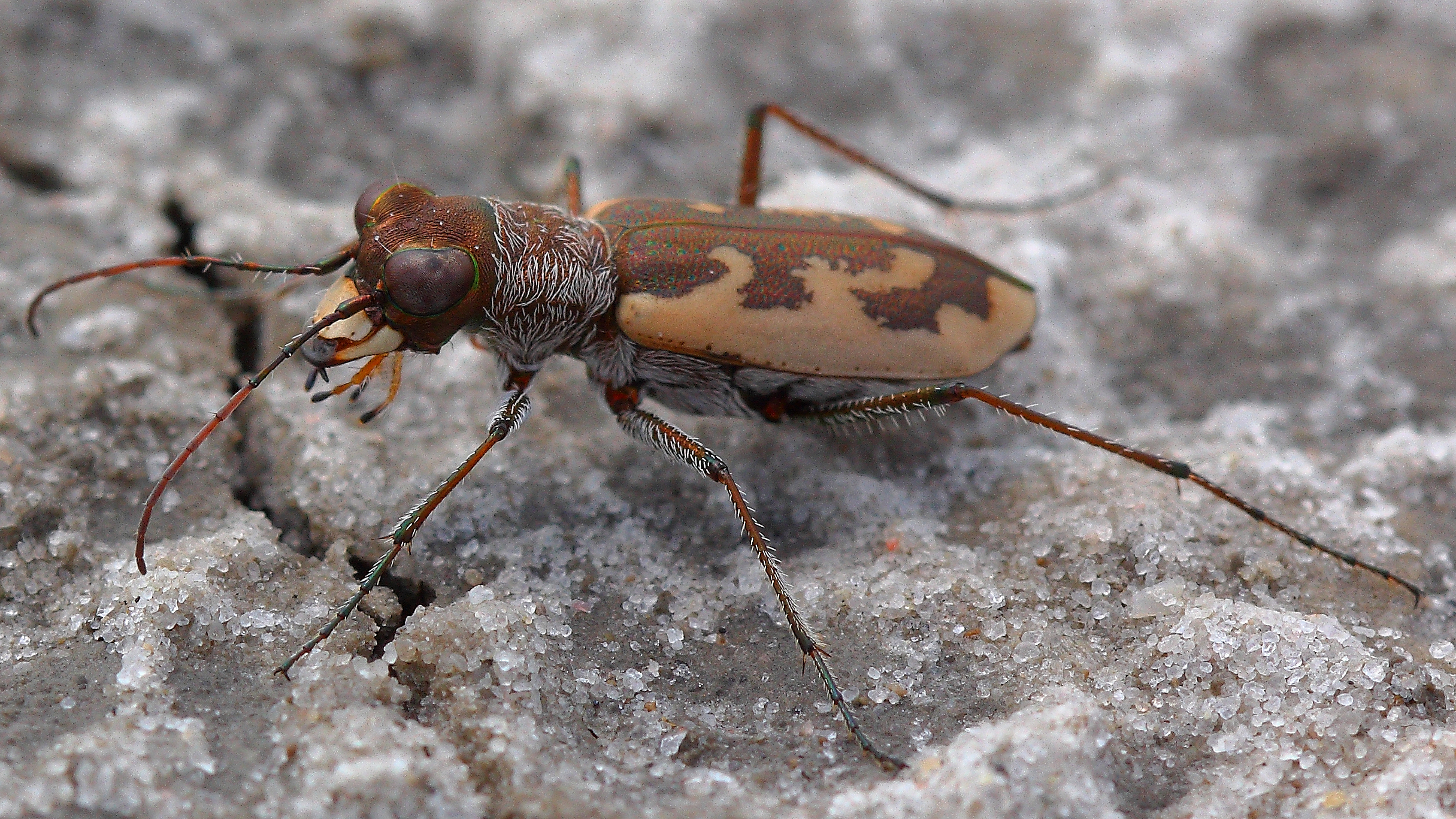

Scientific classification
- Kingdom: Animalia
- Phylum: Arthropoda
- Class: Insecta
- Order: Coleoptera
- Suborder: Adephaga
- Family: Cicindelidae
- Genus: Cephalota
- Species: C. chiloleuca

Binomial name
- Cephalota chiloleuca (Fischer von Waldheim, 1820)

Synonyms
- Cicindela chiloleuca Fischer von Waldheim, 1820; Cicindela circumpicta Chaudoir, 1861; Cicindela circumscripta Chaudoir, 1861; Cicindela marcens Zoubkoff, 1833; Cicindela mniszechi W.Horn, 1891

= Cephalota chiloleuca =

Species of beetle

Cephalota chiloleuca is a species of tiger beetle. This species is found in Hungary, Ukraine, Bulgaria, Romania, Moldova, Kazakhstan, China, South Korea, Russia and Mongolia. Its habitat consists of salt marshes.
