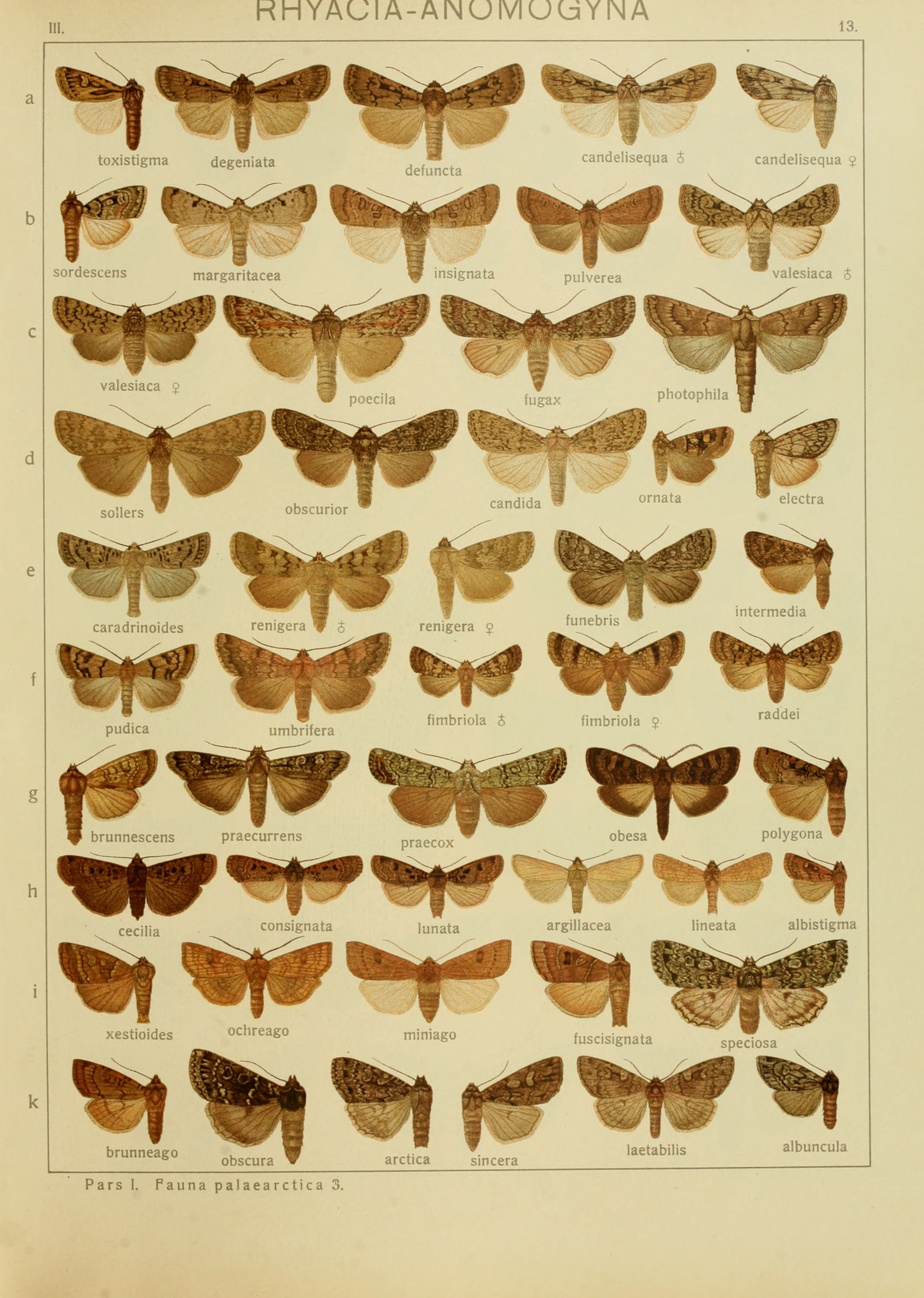
- 13f

Scientific classification
- Domain: Eukaryota
- Kingdom: Animalia
- Phylum: Arthropoda
- Class: Insecta
- Order: Lepidoptera
- Superfamily: Noctuoidea
- Family: Noctuidae
- Genus: Chersotis
- Species: C. fimbriola

Binomial name
- Chersotis fimbriola (Esper, [1803])

Synonyms
- Phalaena (Noctua) fimbriola Esper, [1803]; Agrotis raddei Christoph, 1877; Noctua maravignae Duponchel, 1826; Agrotis (Rhyacia) amaliae Fernández, 1931

= Chersotis fimbriola =

Species of moth

Chersotis fimbriola is a moth of the family Noctuidae. It is found in number of isolated populations from Austria to Spain, Morocco, Turkey, Iraq, Iran and Turkmenistan.

== Description ==
Warren (1914) states R. fimbriola Esp. (= maravigna Dup.) Forewing dark greyish ochreous, often much suffused with fuscous; stigmata of the ground colour, often indistinct, the upper two always separated by a fuscous black blotch forming part of a thick median shade; submarginal line preceded by a blackish shade; the raddei. marginal area fuscous; hindwing fuscous brown. — The ground colour of ab. raddei Chr. (13 f) is paler and brighter, the dark suffusion less, and the markings clearer; the underside likewise much paler. — A south European species, found in France, Spain, N. Italy, Switzerland, and Hungary; occurring also in Western Asia, in Armenia, Asia Minor, Syria, Persia and W. Turkestan, these Asiatic examples being usually the form raddei. Larva dark brownish grey; dorsal and subdorsal lines paler: between them on each segment two oblique black streaks; similar streaks also between the subdorsal and the conspicuous dark lateral lines; thoracic plate brown with 3 white streaks; head shining brown; on a variety of low-growing plants.

== Subspecies ==
- Chersotis fimbriola fimbriola (Austria, Hungary)
- Chersotis fimbriola baloghi (northern Hungary, southern Slovakia)
- Chersotis fimbriola vallensis (Wallis (Piemont), Alpes-Maritimes)
- Chersotis fimbriola hackeri (south-eastern France)
- Chersotis fimbriola iberica (Spain)
- Chersotis fimbriola iminenia (the High Atlas in Morocco)
- Chersotis fimbriola rifensis (Middle Atlas and Rif in Morocco)
- Chersotis fimbriola maravignae (Sicily)
- Chersotis fimbriola forsteri (Yugoslavia, Bulgaria, Greece)
- Chersotis fimbriola bohatschi (Turkey, Armenia)
- Chersotis fimbriola zernyi (southern Turkey, Israel, Iraq, south-eastern Iran)
- Chersotis fimbriola raddei (northern Iran, eastern Armenia, Turkmenistan)

== Biology ==
Adults are on wing from June to August. There is one generation per year.

The larvae feed on various herbaceous plants.
