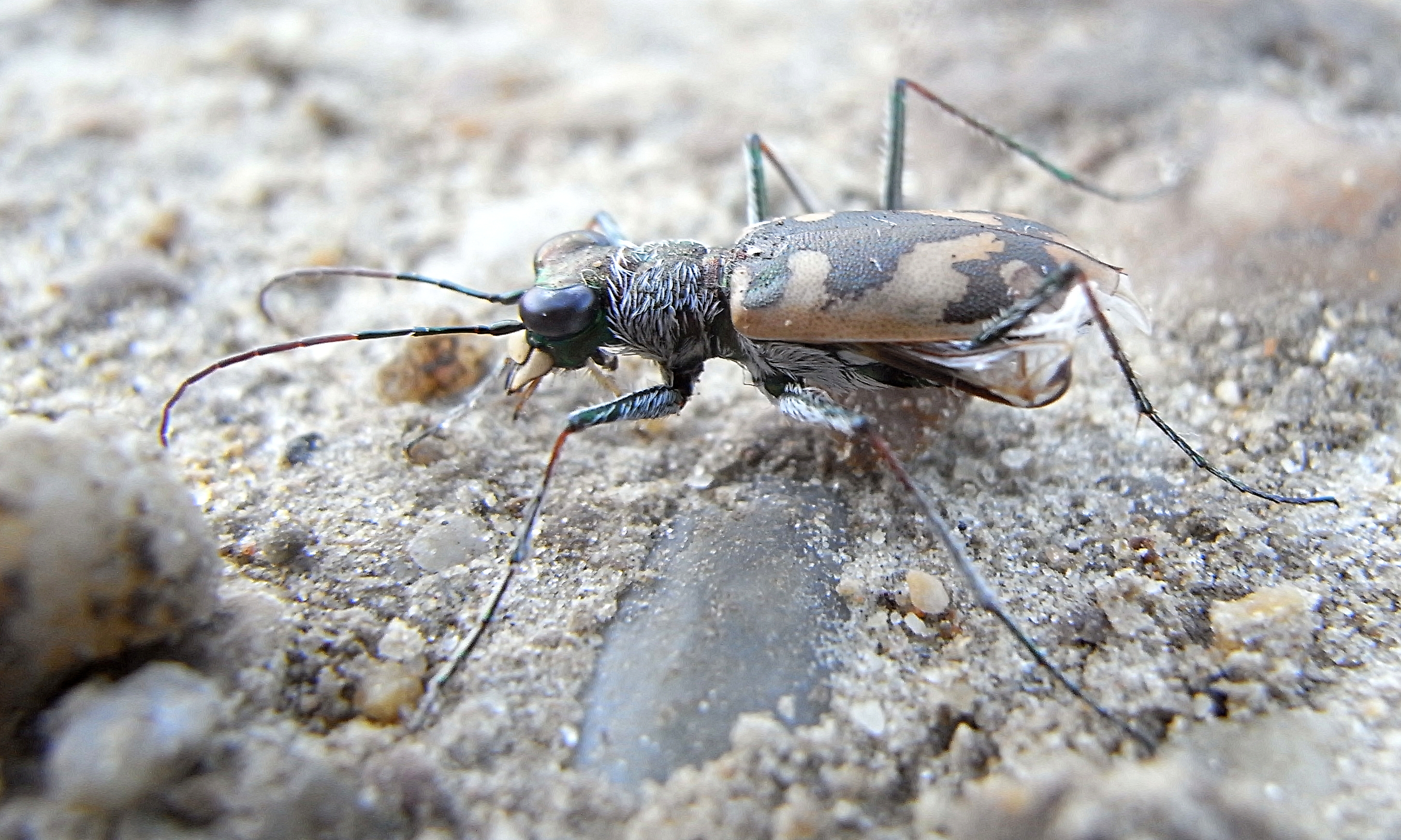
- Cephalota circumdata

Scientific classification
- Kingdom: Animalia
- Phylum: Arthropoda
- Clade: Pancrustacea
- Class: Insecta
- Order: Coleoptera
- Suborder: Adephaga
- Family: Cicindelidae
- Tribe: Cicindelini
- Subtribe: Cicindelina
- Genus: Cephalota; Dokhtouroff, 1883

Subgenera
- Cassolaia Wiesner, 1985; Cephalota Dokhtouroff, 1883; Taenidia Rivalier, 1950

= Cephalota =

Genus of beetles

Cephalota is a genus in the beetle family Cicindelidae. There are more than 20 described species in Cephalota.

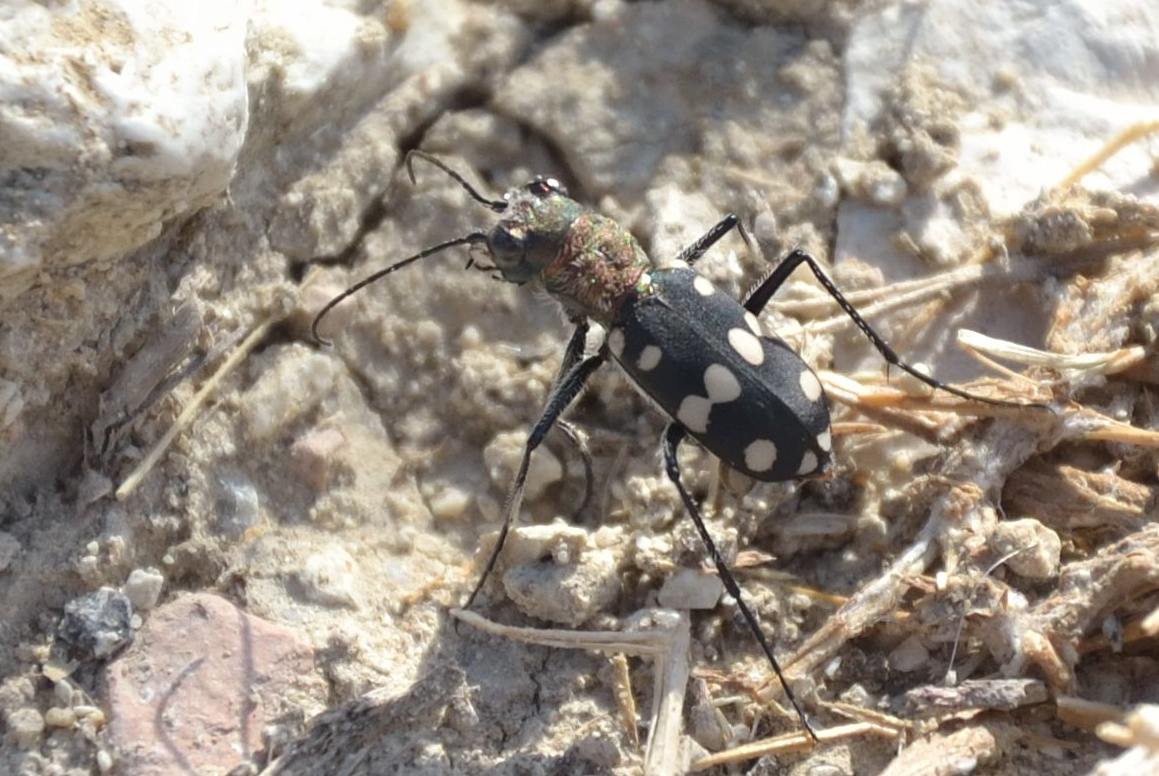
Cephalota maura

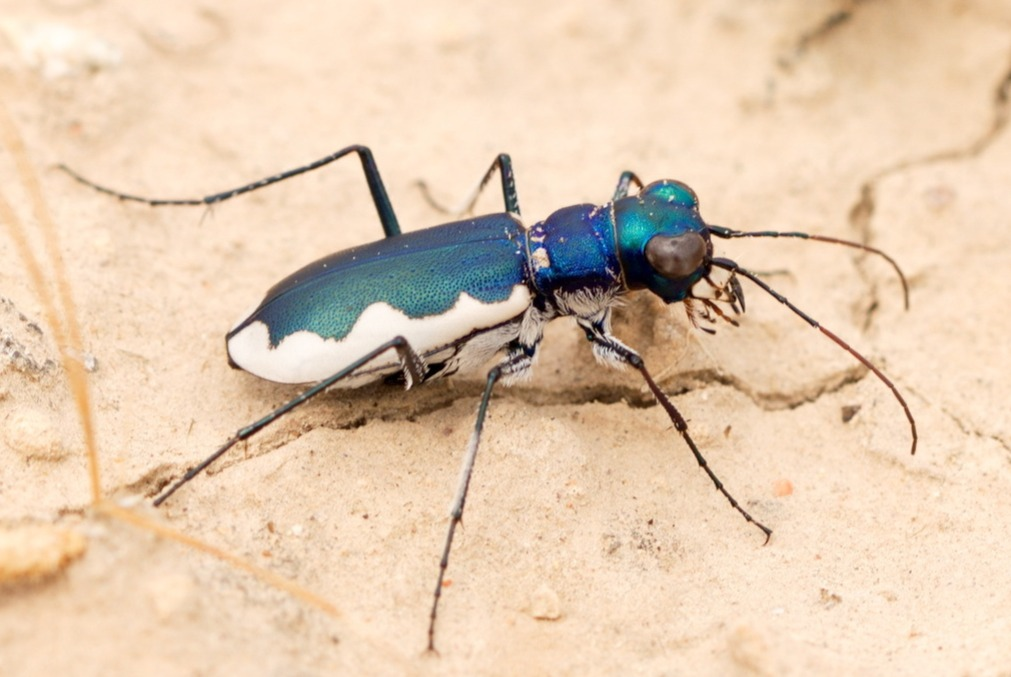
Cephalota galathea

== Species ==
These 27 species belong to the genus Cephalota:

- Subgenus Cassolaia Wiesner, 1985
  - Cephalota maura (Linnaeus, 1758)
- Subgenus Cephalota Dokhtouroff, 1883
  - Cephalota hispanica (Gory, 1833)
  - Cephalota luctuosa (Dejean, 1831)
  - Cephalota pseudodeserticola (W.Horn, 1891)
  - Cephalota turcica (Schaum, 1859)
- Subgenus Taenidia Rivalier, 1950
  - Cephalota atrata (Pallas, 1776)
  - Cephalota besseri (Dejean, 1826)
  - Cephalota chiloleuca (Fischer von Waldheim, 1820)
  - Cephalota circumdata (Dejean, 1822)
  - Cephalota deserticola (Faldermann, 1836)
  - Cephalota deserticoloides (Codina, 1931)
  - Cephalota dulcinea Lopez; de la Rosa & Baena, 2006
  - Cephalota eiselti (Mandl, 1967)
  - Cephalota elegans (Fischer von Waldheim, 1823)
  - Cephalota galathea (Thieme, 1881)
  - Cephalota hajdajorum Gebert, 2016
  - Cephalota illecebrosa (Dokhtouroff, 1885)
  - Cephalota jakowlewi (Semenov, 1896)
  - Cephalota kutshumi (Putchkov, 1993)
  - Cephalota littorea (Forskål, 1775)
  - Cephalota schrenkii (Gebler, 1841)
  - Cephalota susanneae Gebert, 1994
  - Cephalota tibialis (Dejean, 1822)
  - Cephalota turcosinensis (Mandl, 1938)
  - Cephalota vartianorum (Mandl, 1967)
  - Cephalota vonderdeckeni Gebert, 1992
  - Cephalota zarudniana (Tschitscherine, 1903)
