= Cephalota susanneae =

Scientific classification
- Kingdom: Animalia
- Phylum: Arthropoda
- Class: Insecta
- Order: Coleoptera
- Suborder: Adephaga
- Family: Cicindelidae
- Genus: Cephalota
- Species: C. susanneae

Binomial name
- Cephalota susanneae Gebert, 1994

Species of beetle

Cephalota susanneae is a species of tiger beetle. This species is found in Kazakhstan.
