= Cephalota eiselti =

Scientific classification
- Kingdom: Animalia
- Phylum: Arthropoda
- Clade: Pancrustacea
- Class: Insecta
- Order: Coleoptera
- Suborder: Adephaga
- Family: Cicindelidae
- Genus: Cephalota
- Species: C. eiselti

Binomial name
- Cephalota eiselti (Mandl, 1967)

Synonyms
- Cicindela eiselti Mandl, 1967; Cicindela cankiriana Korell & Kleinfeld, 1985

Species of beetle

Cephalota eiselti is a species of tiger beetle. This species is found in Turkey.

== Subspecies ==
- Cephalota eiselti eiselti (central Turkey)
- Cephalota eiselti cankiriana (Korell & Kleinfeld, 1985) (north of central Turkey)
