= Cephalota turcica =

Scientific classification
- Kingdom: Animalia
- Phylum: Arthropoda
- Class: Insecta
- Order: Coleoptera
- Suborder: Adephaga
- Family: Cicindelidae
- Genus: Cephalota
- Species: C. turcica

Binomial name
- Cephalota turcica (Schaum, 1859)

Synonyms
- Cicindela turcica Schaum, 1859

Species of beetle

Cephalota turcica is a species of tiger beetle. This species is found in North Macedonia, Greece, Bulgaria and Turkey. The habitat consists of salt marshes.
