= Cephalota vonderdeckeni =

Scientific classification
- Kingdom: Animalia
- Phylum: Arthropoda
- Class: Insecta
- Order: Coleoptera
- Suborder: Adephaga
- Family: Cicindelidae
- Genus: Cephalota
- Species: C. vonderdeckeni

Binomial name
- Cephalota vonderdeckeni Gebert, 1992

Species of beetle

Cephalota vonderdeckeni is a species of tiger beetle. This species is found in Somalia.

== Etymology ==
The species is named for Baron Karl Klaus von der Decken.
