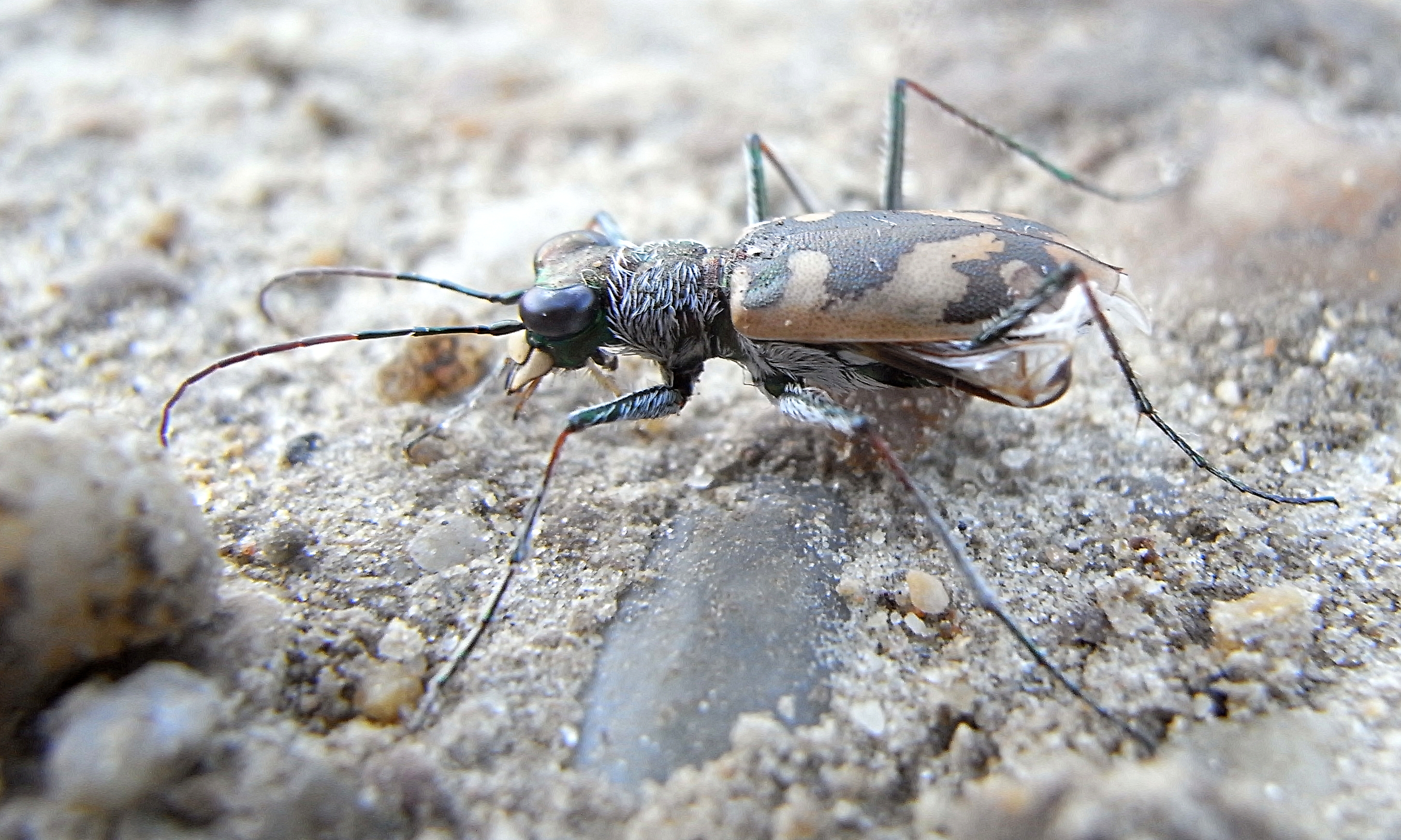

Scientific classification
- Kingdom: Animalia
- Phylum: Arthropoda
- Class: Insecta
- Order: Coleoptera
- Suborder: Adephaga
- Family: Cicindelidae
- Genus: Cephalota
- Species: C. circumdata

Binomial name
- Cephalota circumdata (Dejean, 1822)

Subspecies
- Cephalota circumdata cappadocica; Cephalota circumdata circumdata; Cephalota circumdata hattusae; Cephalota circumdata imperialis; Cephalota circumdata leonschaeferi

Synonyms
- Cicindela circumdata Dejean, 1822; Cicindela dilacerata Dejean, 1831; Cicindela imperialis Klug, 1834; Cicindela internejuncta Pic, 1938; Cicindela marthae Barthe, 1908; Cicindela theresae Pic, 1938

= Cephalota circumdata =

Species of beetle

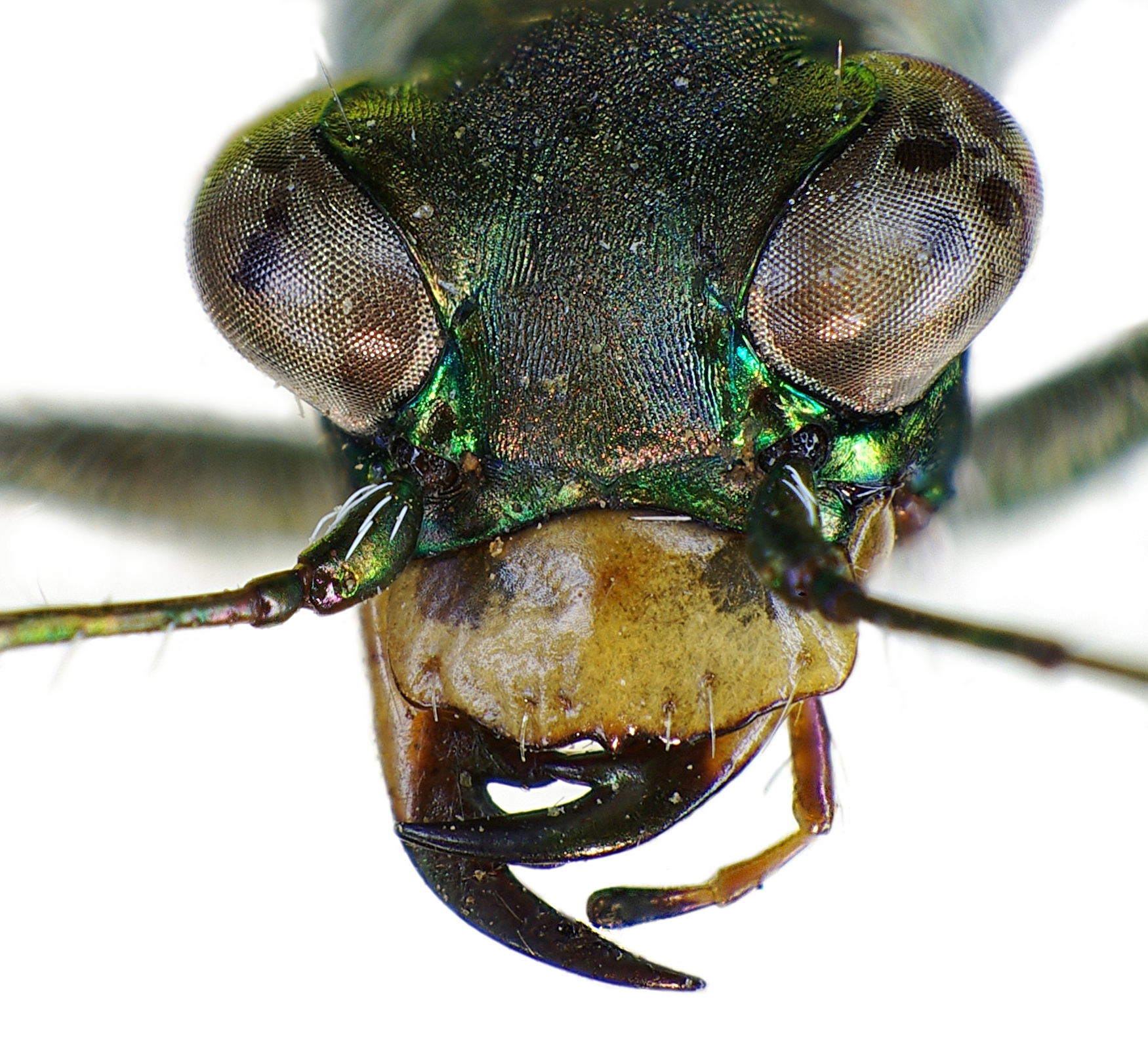
Head of Cephalota circumdata, showing the compound eyes and mouthparts

Cephalota circumdata is a tiger beetle species in the genus Cephalota that can be found in such European countries as Albania, Bulgaria, France, Greece, Italy, North Macedonia, Romania, Spain, Ukraine, and on the islands such as Balearic, Sardinia, and Sicily. It can also be found in African nations of Algeria and Tunisia, and in Turkey.

== Subspecies ==
- Cephalota circumdata circumdata (Italy, Albania, Greece, Bulgaria, Turkey)
- Cephalota circumdata cappadocica Franzen, 1996 (Turkey)
- Cephalota circumdata hattusae Franzen, 1996 (Turkey)
- Cephalota circumdata imperialis (Klug, 1834) (Spain, Italy, Algeria, Tunisia)
- Cephalota circumdata leonschaeferi Cassola, 1970 (France, Italy)
