= Cephalota schrenkii =

Scientific classification
- Kingdom: Animalia
- Phylum: Arthropoda
- Class: Insecta
- Order: Coleoptera
- Suborder: Adephaga
- Family: Cicindelidae
- Genus: Cephalota
- Species: C. schrenkii

Binomial name
- Cephalota schrenkii (Gebler, 1841)

Synonyms
- Cicindela schrenkii Gebler, 1841; Cicindela benjamini Semenov, 1904; Cicindela ordinaria Semenov, 1904; Cicindela transcaspica Semenov, 1896

Species of beetle

Cephalota schrenkii is a species of tiger beetle. This species is found in Iran, Kazakhstan, Uzbekistan, Turkmenistan, Afghanistan and China.
