= Cephalota besseri =

Scientific classification
- Kingdom: Animalia
- Phylum: Arthropoda
- Class: Insecta
- Order: Coleoptera
- Suborder: Adephaga
- Family: Cicindelidae
- Genus: Cephalota
- Species: C. besseri

Binomial name
- Cephalota besseri (Dejean, 1826)

Synonyms
- Cicindela besseri Dejean, 1826; Cicindela dejeanii Fischer von Waldheim, 1832; Cicindela heydeni Kraatz, 1890; Cicindela recurvata Kraatz, 1890

Species of beetle

Cephalota besseri is a species of tiger beetle. This species is found in Ukraine, Kazakhstan and Russia. Its habitat consists of salt marshes and solonchaks with sparse halophytic vegetation.
