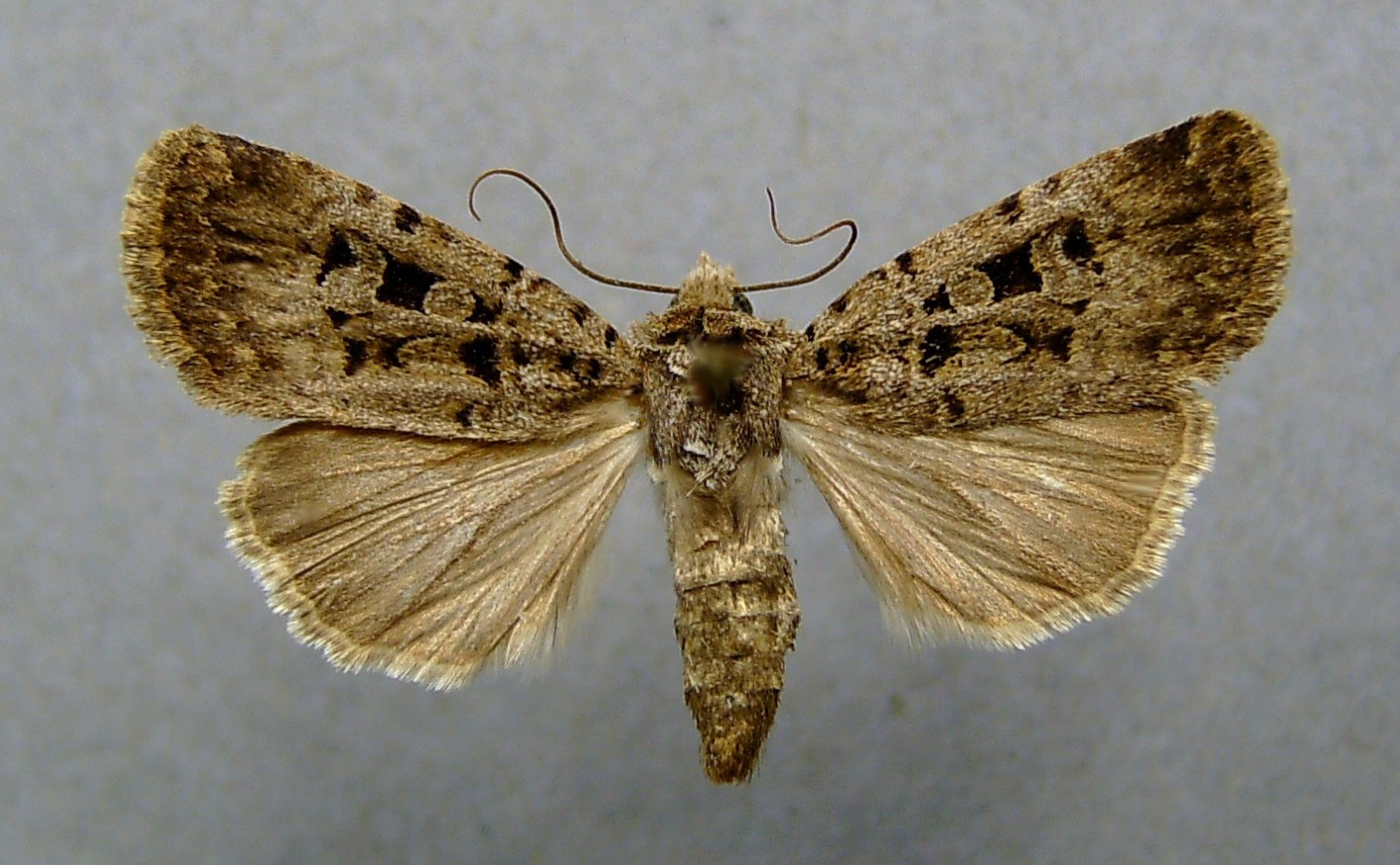

Scientific classification
- Kingdom: Animalia
- Phylum: Arthropoda
- Clade: Pancrustacea
- Class: Insecta
- Order: Lepidoptera
- Superfamily: Noctuoidea
- Family: Noctuidae
- Genus: Chersotis
- Species: C. multangula

Binomial name
- Chersotis multangula Hübner, 1803

Synonyms
- Noctua multangula; Agrotis multangula

= Chersotis multangula =

Species of moth

Chersotis multangula is a moth of the family Noctuidae. It is found in the mountainous areas (on heights of over 2,000 meters) of Central and Southern Europe, Morocco, Turkey, Armenia, Iran, Syria, Lebanon and the Caucasus.

== Description ==
The wingspan is 32–38 mm.

Warren (1914) states R. multangula Hbn. Forewing greyish fuscous; the cell, the base of claviform stigma, and a streak from its tip to outer fine blackish; termen darker, with the submarginal line indistinct; hindwing sub- brownish grey. The male is paler and smaller, with hindwing whiter. — ab. subrectangula Stgr.[Chersotis rectangula (Denis & Schiffermüller, 1775) C. r. subrectangula (Staudinger, 1871)] (= rectanrectangula Boisd. part) is merely a darker form; ab. dissoluta Stgr. (lOh) is greyer and paler, the dark markings by contrast more conspicuous. The species occurs throughout S. Europe, in Asia Minor, Armenia, Persia, Turkestan, Tibet and Amurland. Larva earth-brown; dorsal line white with conspicuous black edges; subdorsal fines dull, pale, with an elongate black spot on each segment; lateral lines whitish; spiracles black;thoracic shield brown with 3 white lines; head blackish brown with two dark streaks; said to feed on Galium.

== Subspecies ==
There are three recognised subspecies:

- Chersotis multangula multangula
- Chersotis multangula subdissoluta (Turkey, Western Turkmenistan, Armenia, the Caucasus, Northern Iran, Syria and Lebanon)
- Chersotis multangula andreae (Pyrenees, Morocco)

== Biology ==
The moth flies from June to August depending on the location.

The larvae feed on Galium mollugo and other plants.
