= Cephalota jakowlewi =

Scientific classification
- Kingdom: Animalia
- Phylum: Arthropoda
- Class: Insecta
- Order: Coleoptera
- Suborder: Adephaga
- Family: Cicindelidae
- Genus: Cephalota
- Species: C. jakowlewi

Binomial name
- Cephalota jakowlewi (Semenov, 1896)

Synonyms
- Cicindela jakowlewi Semenov, 1896

Species of beetle

Cephalota jakowlewi is a species of tiger beetle. This species is found in Turkmenistan.
