= Chersotis ebertorum =

Scientific classification
- Domain: Eukaryota
- Kingdom: Animalia
- Phylum: Arthropoda
- Class: Insecta
- Order: Lepidoptera
- Superfamily: Noctuoidea
- Family: Noctuidae
- Genus: Chersotis
- Species: C. ebertorum

Binomial name
- Chersotis ebertorum Koçak, 1980

Species of moth

Chersotis ebertorum is a moth of the family Noctuidae. It is found in the eastern part of Turkey, Iran, Transcaucasia and the Levant.

Adults are on wing from May to June. There is one generation per year.
