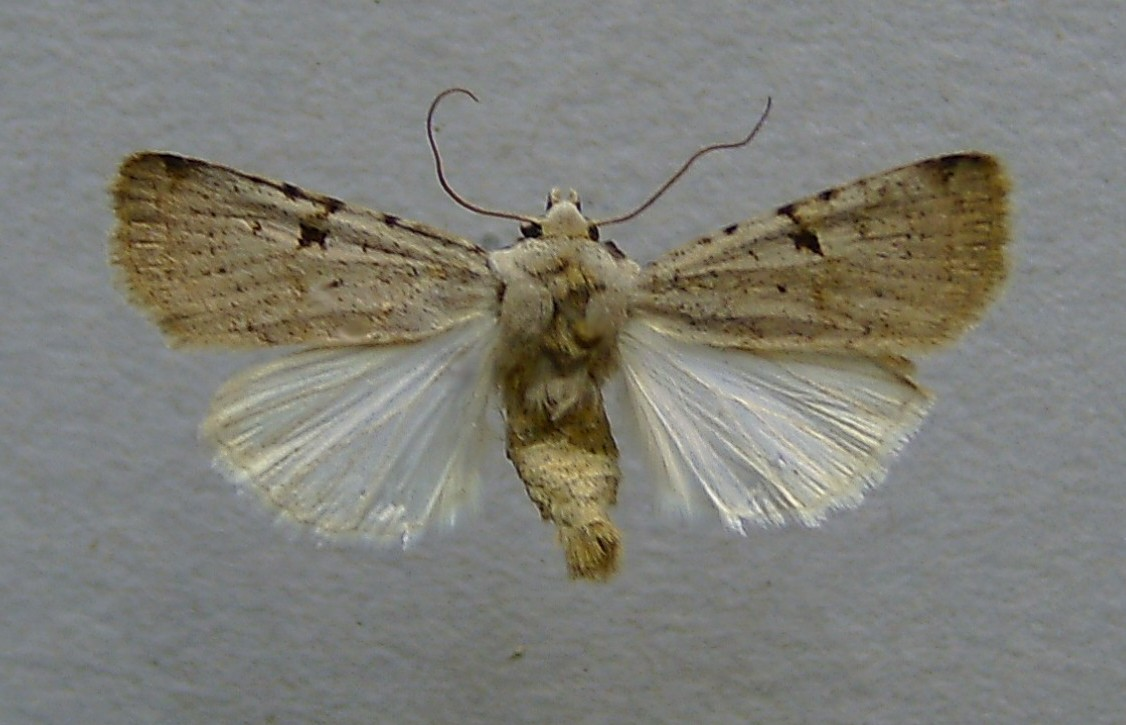

Scientific classification
- Kingdom: Animalia
- Phylum: Arthropoda
- Class: Insecta
- Order: Lepidoptera
- Superfamily: Noctuoidea
- Family: Noctuidae
- Genus: Chersotis
- Species: C. margaritacea

Binomial name
- Chersotis margaritacea Villers, 1789

Synonyms
- Noctua margaritacea; Noctua i-intactum; Rhyacia margaritacea; Agrotis margaritacea

= Chersotis margaritacea =

Species of moth

Chersotis margaritacea is a moth of the family Noctuidae. It is found in Central and Southern Europe up to heights of 1,500 meters. Outside of Europe, it is found in Algeria, Morocco, Anatolia, Iran, Georgia, Armenia, Kazakhstan up to the Altai Mountains.

== Description ==
The wingspan is 32–40 mm. Warren (1914) states R. margaritacea Vill.(= I-intactum Hbn., glareosa Tr., nec Esp.) Forewing pearl-grey, slight flushed with, pink; lines marked by black costal spots; upper stigmata large, obscurely marked, separated by a square black spot; hindwing white, with the veins and terminal area darkened in female and slightly also in dark well-marked males. Occurs throughout S. Europe, in France, Italy, Switzerland, S. Germany, Austria, Hungary, Roumelia, S. Russia; also in Asia Minor, Armenia, W. Siberia, and Turkestan. Larva yellowish brown, marbled with dark above; dorsal and subdorsal lines white, with oblique black streaks between; a red and white lateral line dark-edged above; on low plants.

== Biology ==
The moth flies from June to September depending on the location.

The larvae feed on Galium and Asperula cynanchica.
