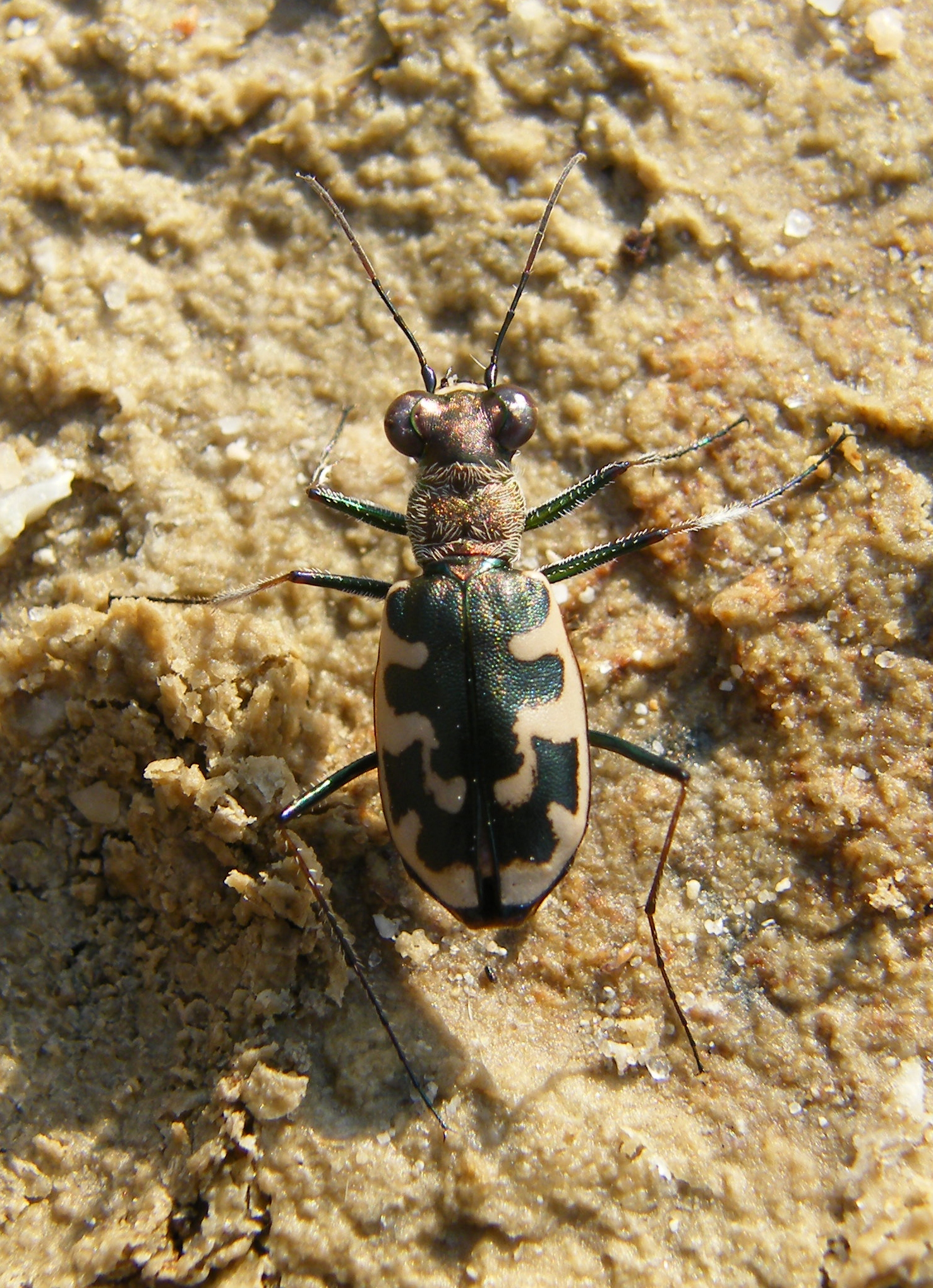
- Cephalota littorea goudotii

Scientific classification
- Kingdom: Animalia
- Phylum: Arthropoda
- Class: Insecta
- Order: Coleoptera
- Suborder: Adephaga
- Family: Cicindelidae
- Genus: Cephalota
- Species: C. littorea

Binomial name
- Cephalota littorea (Forskål, 1775)

Synonyms
- Cicindela littorea Forskål, 1775; Cicindela alboreducta W.Horn, 1934; Cicindela abbasi Ali, 1978; Cicindela arabiana Brouerius van Nidek, 1984; Cicindela pseudolitorea Ali, 1978; Cicindela goudotii Dejean, 1829; Cicindela dilatana Brouerius van Nidek, 1984; Cicindela eudeserticola Ali, 1978; Cicindela jiddaica Ali, 1978

= Cephalota littorea =

Species of beetle

Cephalota littorea is a species of tiger beetle. This species is found in Portugal, Spain, Italy, Morocco, Algeria, Tunisia, Egypt, Israel/Palestine, Saudi Arabia, Oman, Yemen, Chad, Sudan, Eritrea, Djibouti and Somalia.

== Subspecies ==
- Cephalota littorea littorea (Egypt, Israel/Palestine, Saudi Arabia, Chad, Sudan, Eritrea)
- Cephalota littorea alboreducta (W.Horn, 1934) (Saudi Arabia, Oman, Yemen, Sudan, Eritrea, Djibouti, Somalia)
- Cephalota littorea goudotii (Dejean, 1829) (Portugal, Spain, Italy, Morocco, Algeria, Tunisia)
