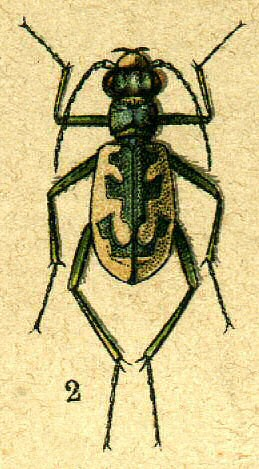
- Illustration from the monograph by Georgiy Jacobson "Beetles Russia and the Western Europe" (1905).
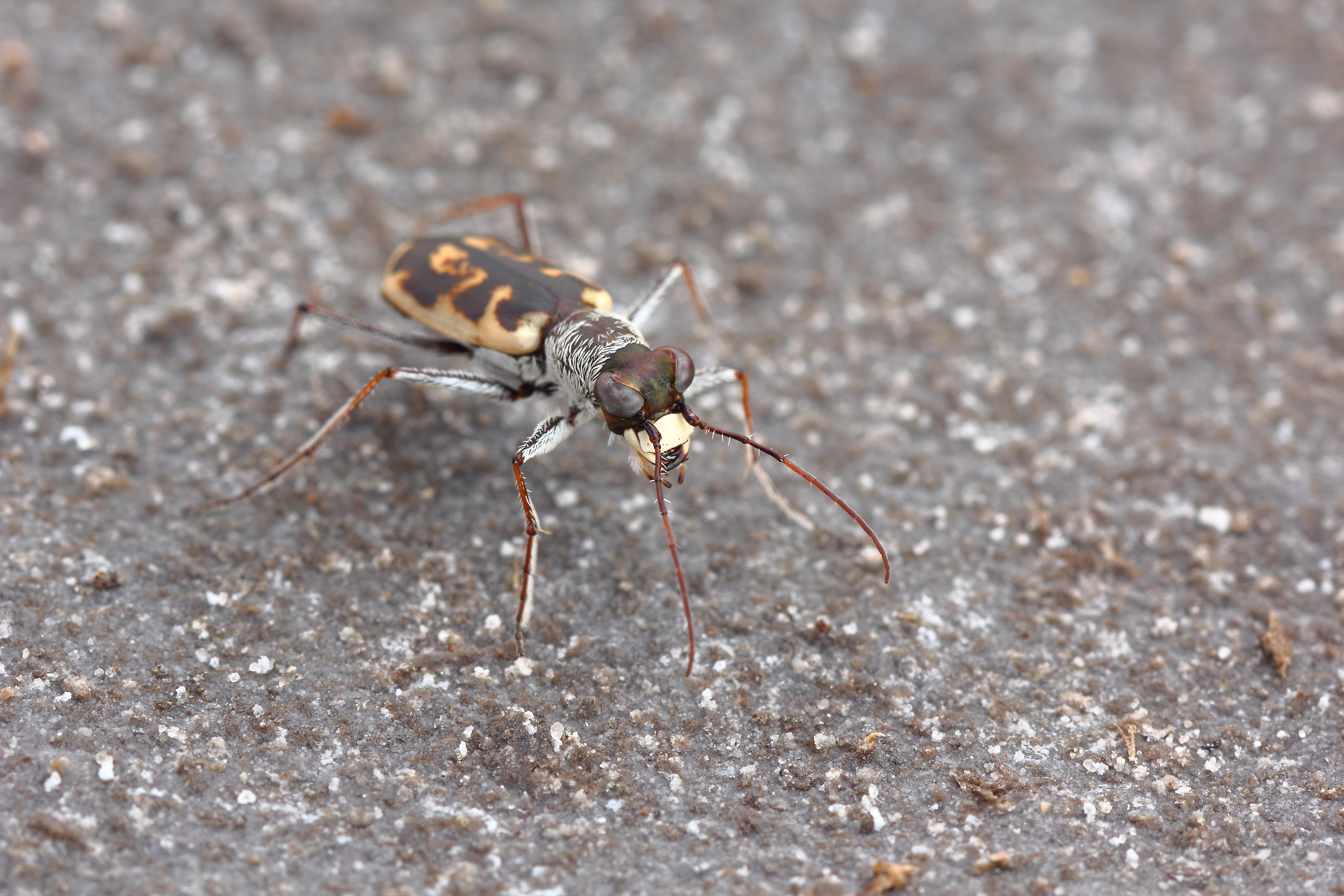

Scientific classification
- Kingdom: Animalia
- Phylum: Arthropoda
- Class: Insecta
- Order: Coleoptera
- Suborder: Adephaga
- Family: Cicindelidae
- Genus: Cephalota
- Species: C. elegans

Binomial name
- Cephalota elegans (Fischer von Waldheim, 1823)

Synonyms
- Cicindela elegans Fourcroy & Geoffroy, 1785; Cicindela brunnea Putchkov, 1993; Cicindela circumscripta Fischer von Waldheim, 1828; Cicindela decipiens Fischer von Waldheim, 1828; Cicindela volgensis Dejean, 1825; Cicindela stigmatophora Fischer von Waldheim, 1828; Cicindela circumdata Krynicki, 1832; Cicindela propinqua Chaudoir, 1835; Cicindela seidlitzi Kraatz, 1890; Cicindela turkmenica Putchkov, 1993

= Cephalota elegans =

Species of beetle

Cephalota elegans is a species in the tiger beetle family Cicindelidae. It is found in eastern Europe and western Asia, in the European-Siberian steppe.

Body length is 12–15 mm. The top is copper or bronze-green with a white pattern on the elytra. The legs and underparts have a metallic sheen. The head has powerful long jagged mandibles. The beetles and larvae are typically diurnal predators. They fly well and run fast.

== Subspecies ==
These four subspecies belong to the species Cephalota elegans:

- Cephalota elegans brunnea (Putchkov, 1993) (Ukraine)
- Cephalota elegans elegans (Fischer von Waldheim, 1823) (Kazakhstan and Russia)
- Cephalota elegans stigmatophora (Fischer von Waldheim, 1828) (Hungary, Ukraine, (former) Yugoslavia, Bulgaria, Romania, Moldova, and Russia)
- Cephalota elegans turkmenica (Putchkov, 1993) (Turkmenistan)
