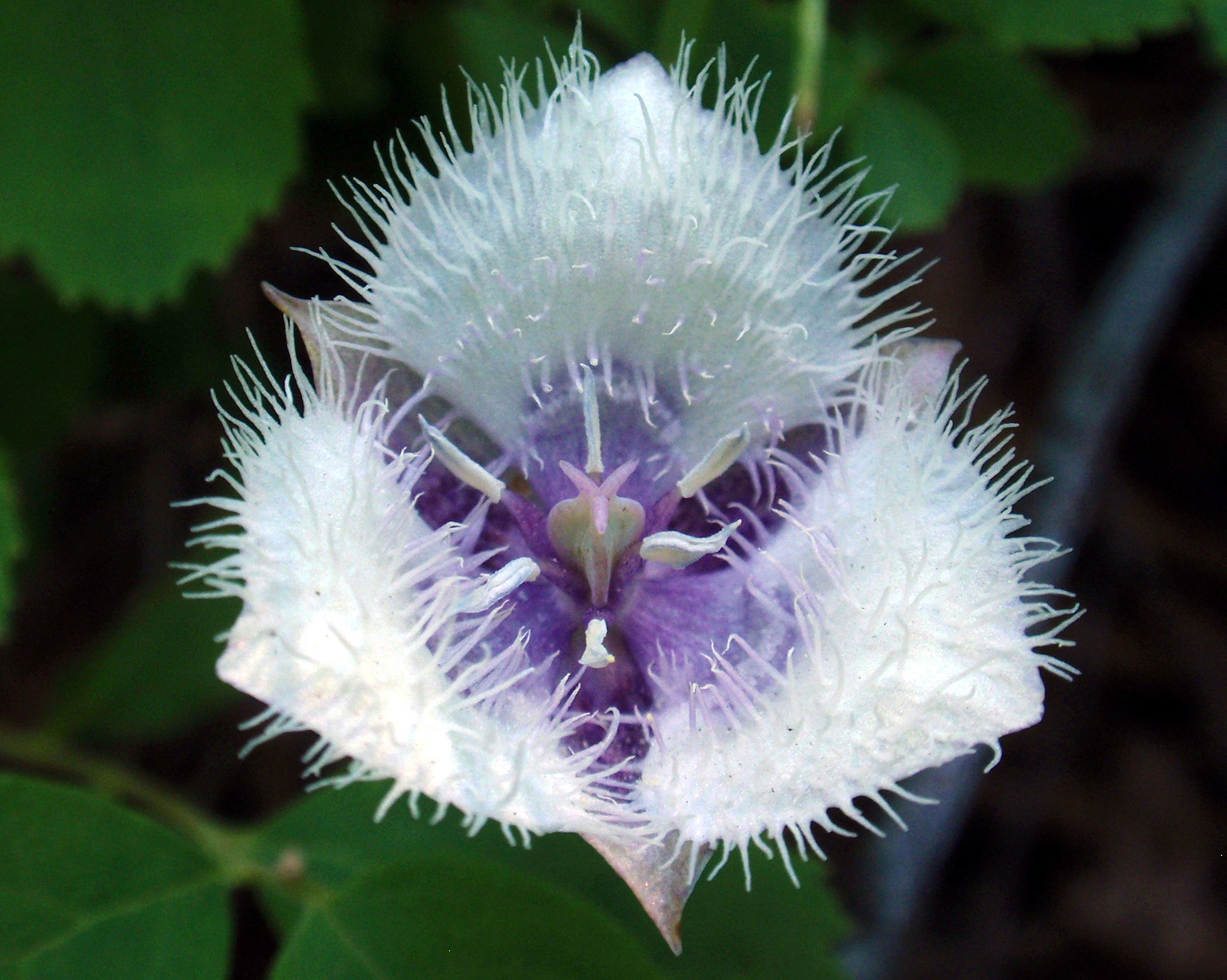
- Calochortus elegans in Klamath Mountains

Conservation status
- Vulnerable (NatureServe)

Scientific classification
- Kingdom: Plantae
- Clade: Tracheophytes
- Clade: Angiosperms
- Clade: Monocots
- Order: Liliales
- Family: Liliaceae
- Genus: Calochortus
- Species: C. elegans

Binomial name
- Calochortus elegans Pursh 1813 not Baker 1875

Synonyms
- Cyclobothra elegans (Pursh) Benth.; Calochortus nanus (Alph.Wood) Piper, syn of var. nanus; Calochortus selwayensis H.St.John, syn of var. selwayensis

= Calochortus elegans =

Species of flowering plant

Calochortus elegans is a species of flowering plant in the lily family known by the common name elegant Mariposa lily, cat's ear, elegant cat's ears or star tulip. It is native to the western United States from northern California to Montana.

It is a perennial herb producing a slender, generally unbranched stem up to 15 centimeters in height. The basal leaf is 10 to 20 centimeters long and does not wither at flowering. The inflorescence bears 1 to 7 erect bell-shaped flowers. Each flower has three sepals and three petals with very hairy inner surfaces and edges. Each petal is greenish white in color with a purple crescent above a hairless patch at the base. The fruit is a winged capsule about 2 centimeters long.

The bulb is a choice wild root vegetable when eaten cooked, and can be eaten raw to avoid starvation. It grows in open woodland and grassy hillsides.

Varieties

- Calochortus elegans var. amoenus (Greene) auct.
- Calochortus elegans var. amoenus hort.
- Calochortus elegans var. elegans Pursh - Idaho, Oregon, Washington
- Calochortus elegans var. lobbii Baker
- Calochortus elegans var. major Hook.
- Calochortus elegans var. minor Hook.
- Calochortus elegans var. nanus Alph.Wood - Oregon, northern California
- Calochortus elegans var. oreophilus Ownbey
- Calochortus elegans var. selwayensis (H.St.John) Ownbey - Idaho, Montana
- Calochortus elegans var. subclavatus Baker
