= Cephalota zarudniana =

Scientific classification
- Kingdom: Animalia
- Phylum: Arthropoda
- Class: Insecta
- Order: Coleoptera
- Suborder: Adephaga
- Family: Cicindelidae
- Genus: Cephalota
- Species: C. zarudniana

Binomial name
- Cephalota zarudniana (Tschitscherine, 1903)

Synonyms
- Cicindela zarudniana Tschitscherine, 1903; Cicindela probsti Mandl, 1976

Species of beetle

Cephalota zarudniana is a species of tiger beetle. This species is found in Israel/Palestine, Syria, Iraq, Saudi Arabia, Yemen and Iran.
