= Corydalis elegans =

Scientific classification
- Kingdom: Plantae
- Clade: Tracheophytes
- Clade: Angiosperms
- Clade: Eudicots
- Order: Ranunculales
- Family: Papaveraceae
- Genus: Corydalis
- Species: C. elegans

Binomial name
- Corydalis elegans Wall. ex Hook.f. et Thomson, 1855

Subspecies
- Corydalis elegans subsp. elegans Wall., 1855; Corydalis elegans subsp. robusta Lidén, 1989

Synonyms
- Capnoides elegans Kuntze

Species of flowering plant in the poppy family

Corydalis elegans (Chinese: 幽雅黄堇; pinyin: yōu yǎ huáng jǐn) is a species of plant in the family Papaveraceae. It is found in India, China and the West Himalayas.
