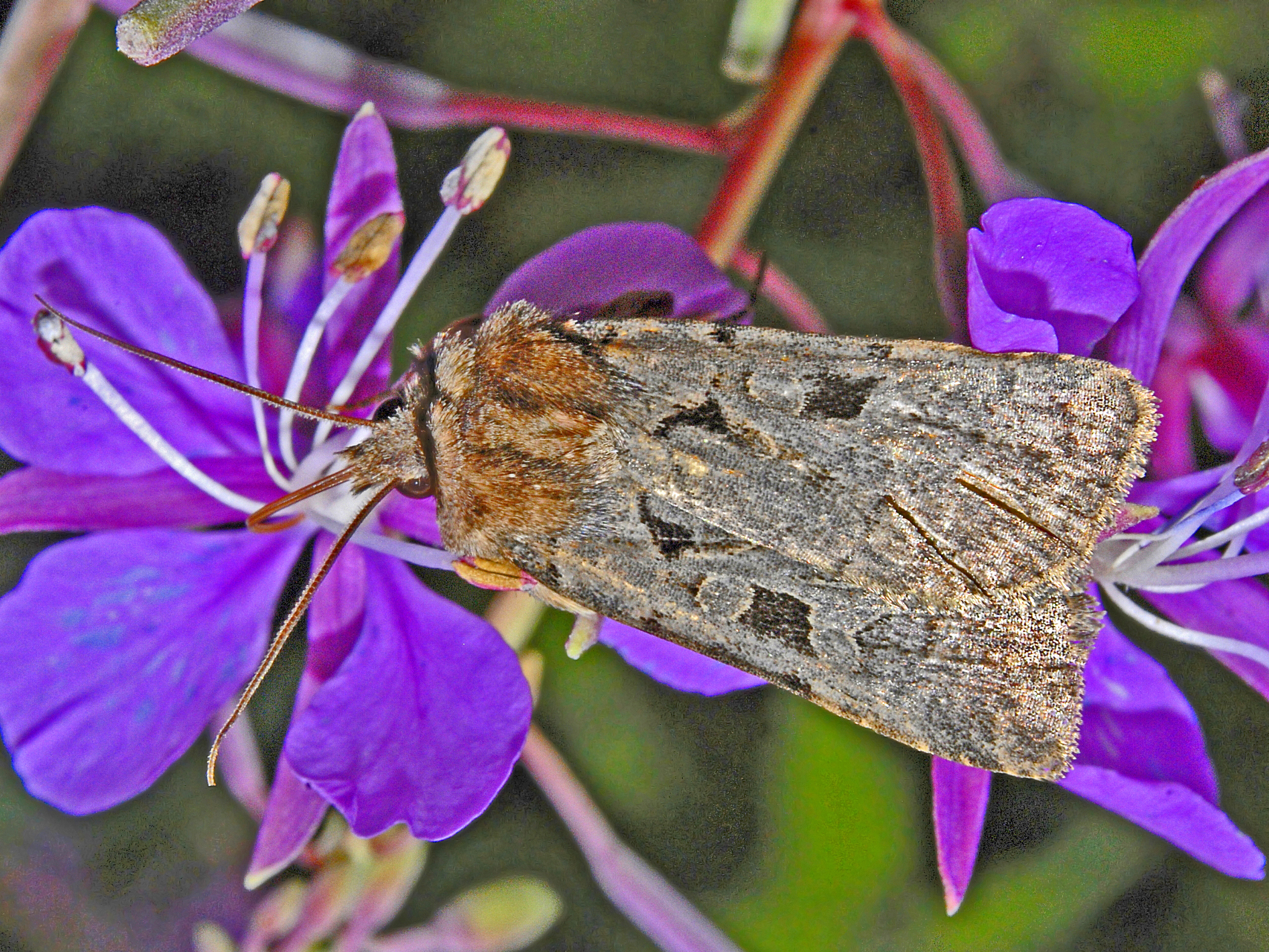

Scientific classification
- Domain: Eukaryota
- Kingdom: Animalia
- Phylum: Arthropoda
- Class: Insecta
- Order: Lepidoptera
- Superfamily: Noctuoidea
- Family: Noctuidae
- Genus: Chersotis
- Species: C. rectangula

Binomial name
- Chersotis rectangula (Denis & Schiffermüller, 1775)

Synonyms
- Noctua rectangula Denis & Schiffermüller, 1775; Agrotis rectangula; Agrotis multangula var. subrectangula Staudinger, 1871

= Chersotis rectangula =

Species of moth

Chersotis rectangula is a moth of the family Noctuidae. It is the type species of the genus Chersotis.

== Description ==
Chersotis rectangula has a wingspan of 29–37 mm. These moths are generally greyish-brown, with not conspicuous dark markings.

== Biology ==
Adults are found from late June to mid-September. Larvae are polyphagous and feed on various herbaceous plants, especially on Melilotus species and Vicia species.

== Distribution ==
This species is present in the southern part of central Europe (Poland, the Czech Republic, Slovakia, Austria, Italy, Greece, Romania and Hungary), in SW Siberia, Altai, Turkmenistan, Caucasus, Armenia, Turkey and in NW Iran.

== Habitat ==
Chersotis rectangula live in bushy areas and in rocky grasslands, mainly in the subalpine habitats, at an elevation of 600–2,400 metres (2,000–7,900 ft) above sea level.

== Subspecies ==
- ''Chersotis rectangula rectangula
- ''Chersotis rectangula subrectangula (Staudinger, 1871) (Turkey)

== Bibliography ==
- Erstbeschreibung: (1775): Ankündung eines systematischen Werkes von den Schmetterlingen der Wienergegend herausgegeben von einigen Lehrern am k. k. Theresianum. 1–323, pl. I a+b, Frontispiz. Wien (Augustin Bernardi).
- Sviridov, A. V., Noctuid moths (Lepidoptera) new for different areas of the Russian Federation, 1. 2002
