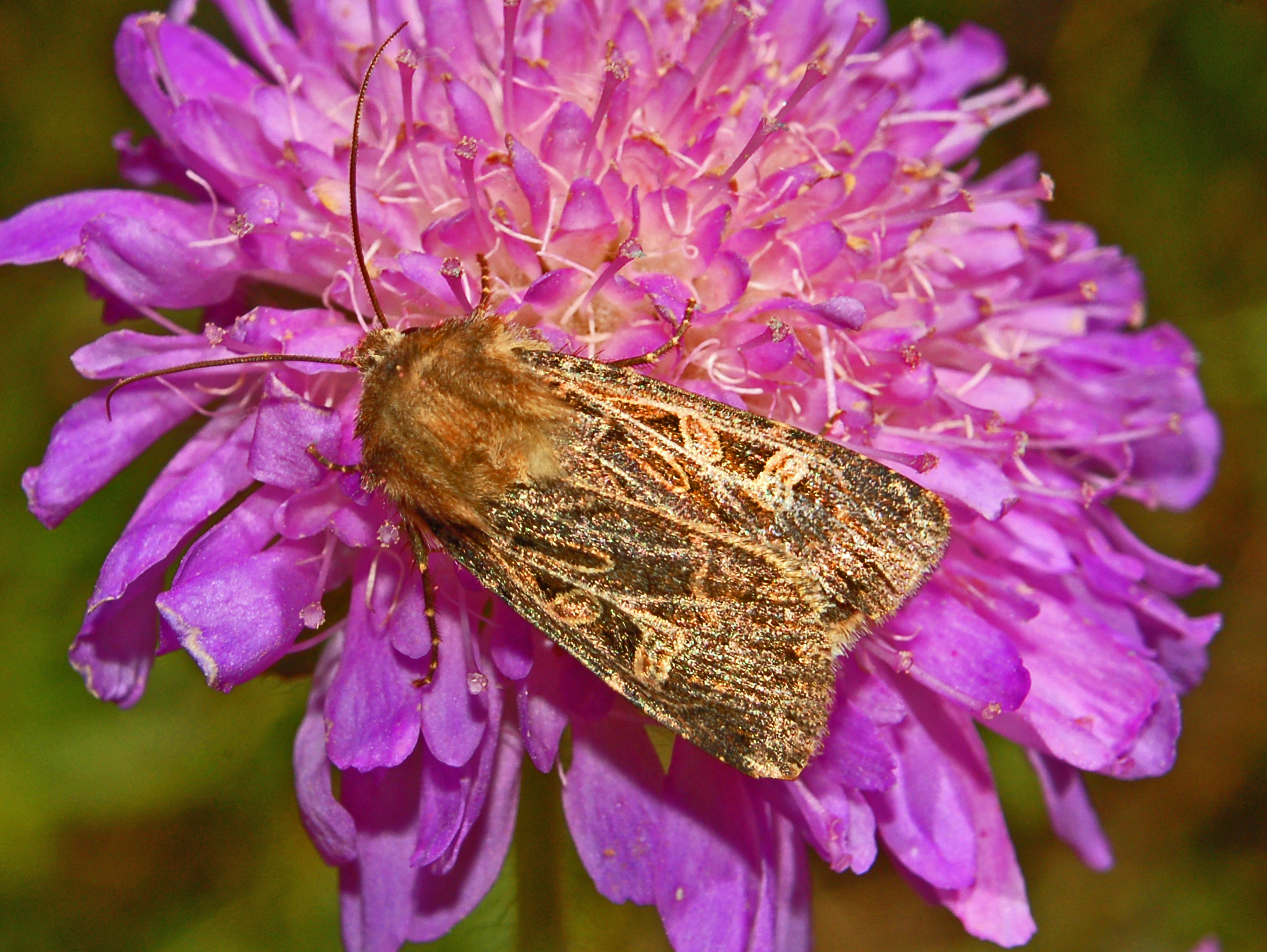

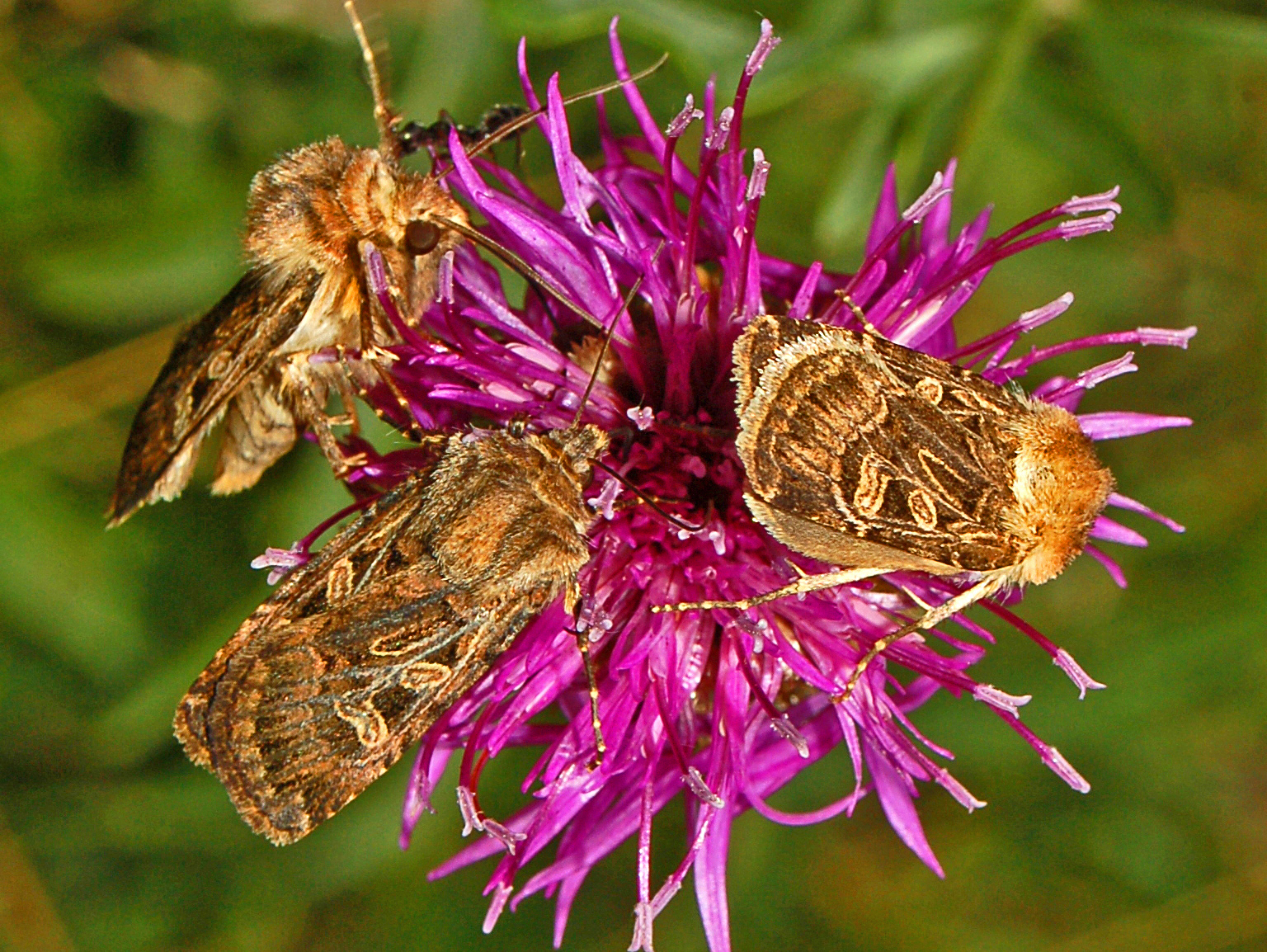

Scientific classification
- Kingdom: Animalia
- Phylum: Arthropoda
- Class: Insecta
- Order: Lepidoptera
- Superfamily: Noctuoidea
- Family: Noctuidae
- Genus: Chersotis
- Species: C. alpestris

Binomial name
- Chersotis alpestris (Boisduval, 1837)

Synonyms
- Agrotis alpestris Boisduval, [1837]; Rhyacia alpestris ponticola Draudt, 1936

= Chersotis alpestris =

Species of moth

Chersotis alpestris is a moth of the family Noctuidae.

== Subspecies ==
- Chersotis alpestris alpestris (Alps, Apennines, Pyrenees)
- Chersotis alpestris ponticola (Draudt, 1936) (south-western Russia, southern Urals, Turkey, Caucasus, Armenia, Kyrgyzstan, Syria, north-western Iran)

== Description ==
Chersotis alpestris has a wingspan of 28–34 millimetres (1.1–1.3 in). The hind wings are light brown in males, while in females they are medium or dark brown. The underside of the wings is usually yellowish brown, though the underside of the hind wings is often more whitish. Seitz states R. alpestris Bsd. (ocellina Hbn., nec. Schiff.) (Ilk). is hardly separable from the preceding [R. ocellina Schiff], but the reniform stigma is less produced and does not touch the orbicular stigma. C. alpestris occurs in nearly the same localities as ocellina; both species are diurnal and are found at rest on flower heads.

== Biology ==
Caterpillars are polyphagous on low plants.

== Distribution ==
This species can be found in Europe (Andorra, Austria, Bulgaria, East European Russia, France, Italy, South European Russia, Spain, Switzerland and Ukraine) and eastward into Asia.

== Bibliography ==
- Erstbeschreibung: BOISDUVAL (1834): Icones historique des lépidoptères d'Europe nouveaux ou peu connus 2: 1-192, pl. 47-84. Paris (Roret).
- COWAN, C. F. (1970): Boisduval's Icones Historiques des Lépidoptères d'Europe 1832-1841. — Journal of the Society for the Bibliography of Natural History 5 (4): 291-302
- Dufay (Claude), 1984.- Chersotis oreina n. sp., noctuelle méconnue des montagnes de l'Europe occidentale (Noctuidae, Noctuinae). Nota Lepidopterologica, 7 (1) : 8-20.
