= Caucasorhynchia =

Caucasorhynchia Temporal range: 247.2–201.3 Ma

Scientific classification
- Kingdom: Animalia
- Phylum: Brachiopoda
- Class: Rhynchonellata
- Order: Rhynchonellida
- Family: †Allorhynchidae
- Genus: †Caucasorhynchia; Dagys, 1963

Species
- †Caucasorhynchia altaplecta (Bockh 1872); †Caucasorhynchia baliana (Bittner 1895); †Caucasorhynchia circularis Jin et al. 1979; †Caucasorhynchia elegans Siblik 1986; †Caucasorhynchia elegans consobrina Siblik 1986; †Caucasorhynchia elegans elegans; †Caucasorhynchia kunensis Dagys 1963; †Caucasorhynchia simplexa Sun 1981; †Caucasorhynchia trigonalis Sun 1981; †Caucasorhynchia worobievi Dagys 1963; †Caucasorhynchia zhidoensis Jin et al. 1979

Extinct genus of brachiopods

Caucasorhynchia is an extinct genus of brachiopods in the family Allorhynchidae. Species are known from the Triassic of Europe, Russia and the United States.

== See also ==
- List of brachiopod genera
