= Chersotis elegans =

Scientific classification
- Domain: Eukaryota
- Kingdom: Animalia
- Phylum: Arthropoda
- Class: Insecta
- Order: Lepidoptera
- Superfamily: Noctuoidea
- Family: Noctuidae
- Genus: Chersotis
- Species: C. elegans

Binomial name
- Chersotis elegans (Eversmann, 1837)

Synonyms
- Agrotis elegans Eversmann, 1837; Agrotis grammiptera Rambur, 1839; Hadena cancellata Freyer, 1840; Agrotis (Rhyacia) elegans aragonensis Schwingenschuss, 1962

Species of moth

Chersotis elegans is a moth of the family Noctuidae. It is found in the mountains of Spain, Greece, Turkey, the Caucasus, Lebanon, Israel and western central Asia.

== Description ==
Warren (1914) states R. elegans Ev. (— grammiptera Bsd., cancellata Frr.) Forewing pale brown, the veins whitish: lines black and white; stigmata margined with white and black, the claviform large and pointed, the reniform angled inwards on median nervure; submarginal line white preceded by a row of black wedge-shaped marks: hindwing of male white with slight subterminal brownish band of female more or less suffused with fuscous. A South European species, found in Spain, France, Greece, and S. Russia; widely spread in W. Asia, and also in Siberia and Turkestan.

== Subspecies ==
- Chersotis elegans elegans
- Chersotis elegans hermonis (Israel)

== Biology ==
Adults are on wing from July to September. There is one generation per year.
