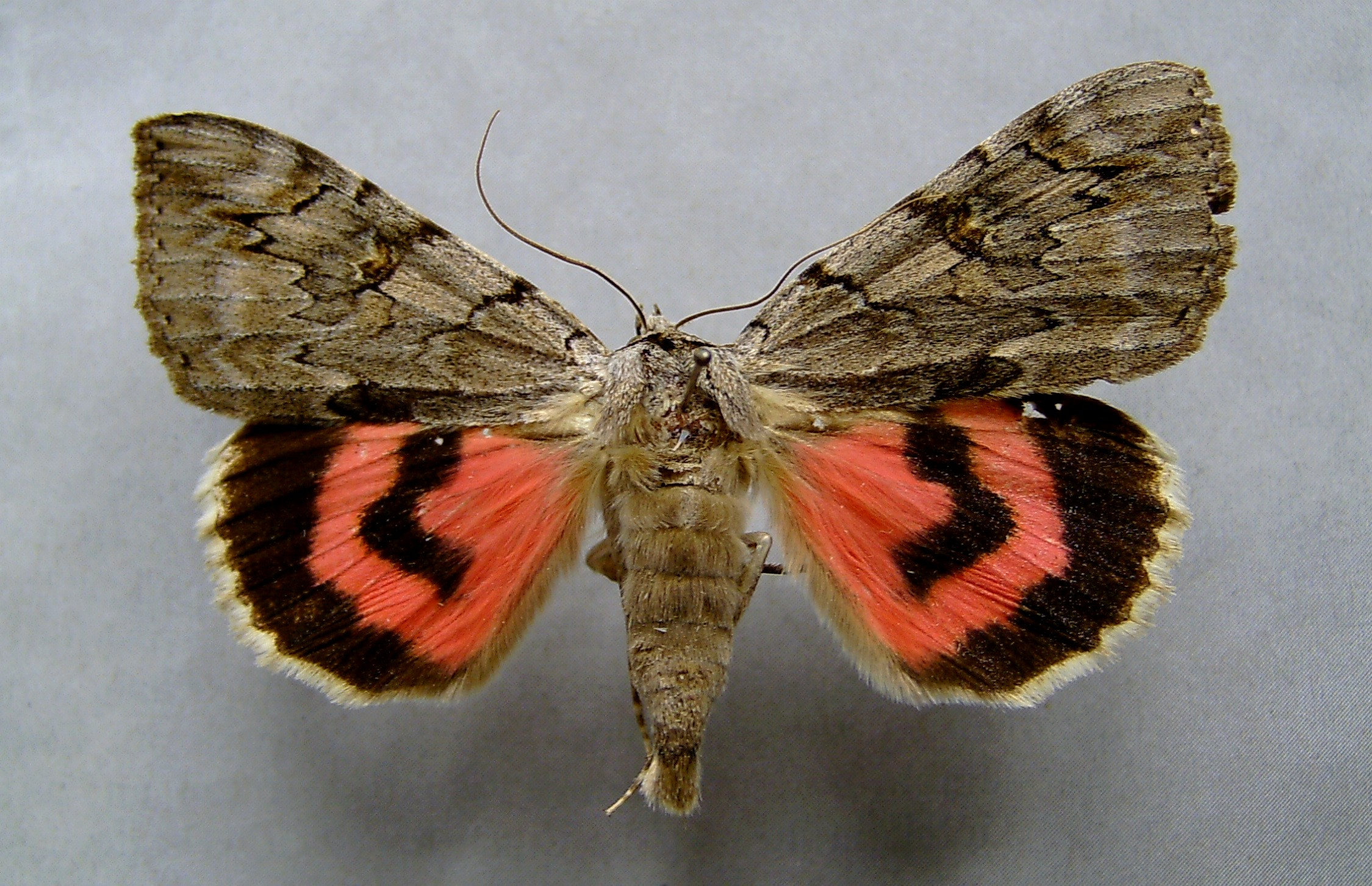

Scientific classification
- Domain: Eukaryota
- Kingdom: Animalia
- Phylum: Arthropoda
- Class: Insecta
- Order: Lepidoptera
- Superfamily: Noctuoidea
- Family: Erebidae
- Genus: Catocala
- Species: C. electa

Binomial name
- Catocala electa (Vieweg, 1790)

Synonyms
- Noctua electa Vieweg, 1790; Catocala zalmunna Butler, 1877

= Catocala electa =

Species of moth

Catocala electa, the rosy underwing, is a moth of the family Erebidae. The species was first described by Karl Friedrich Vieweg in 1790. It can be found in Europe and Asia (ranging to Korea).

== Technical description and variation ==
C. electa Bkh. (= pacta Esp. nec L.) Forewing pale grey dusted with darker; a dark grey, often brownish tinted band beyond outer line and along termen; inner and outer lines double, conversely black and dark grey, less distinctly marked below middle; the inner dentate inwards, the outer outwards with a pair of more prominent teeth on each fold; the outer running inwards above vein 2 and forming an oblong pale blotch below reniform; this is inwardly black and curved, outwardly dentate, containing a brownish lunule, outlined, especially externally, with pale grey; submarginal line dentate, light and dark grey, joined by an oblique dark shade from below apex; median shade distinct at costa, diffuse beyond reniform; hindwing crimson, with a sinuous median band ending on vein 1 and the broad marginal border black; fringe white; — the ab.meridionalis Spul. ( = suffusa Gillm.) from more southern localities, is larger, more shaded with dark grey brown, especially along inner margin; — ab. nigra Spul. is a rare form with blackish brown forewing, the lines whitish or yellowish, the fringe of forewing, the base, and the thorax either pale or blackish; —the ab. lugdunensis Mill. (= flava Spul.) has the red of hindwing changed to yellow; — ab. excellens Schultz shows the hindwings wholly black, the two usual black bands merely appearing deeper black; Chinese and Japanese examples, subsp. zalmunna Btlr. are larger than European, with the markings in lower half of forewing less distinct, and the lunule in the reniform stigma more conspicuously brown; the ground colour ranging from the ordinary pale silvery grey through ochreous grey to the dark grey Gensan and Amur examples, for which latter Schultz proposes the name subsp. subtristis Schultz, similar dark aberrations to which occur occasionally even among European specimens. Larva pale or dark yellowish grey to yellowish brown, finely black-dotted; tubercles yellow; the hump on segment 9 bright yellow with black outline : that on segment 12 bifid, brownish yellow; spiracles white with dark rings; the lateral fringes of filaments whitish. The wingspan is 65–80 mm.

== Subspecies ==
- Catocala electa electa
- Catocala electa tschiliensis Bang-Haas, 1927
- Catocala electa zalmunna Butler, 1877

== Biology ==
The moths flies from July to September depending on the location.

Larvae feed on sallow (Salix species) and poplar (Populus species).
