= N. carnea =

N. carnea may refer to:

- Nocardia carnea, a rod-shaped bacteria
- Noctua carnea, an owlet moth
