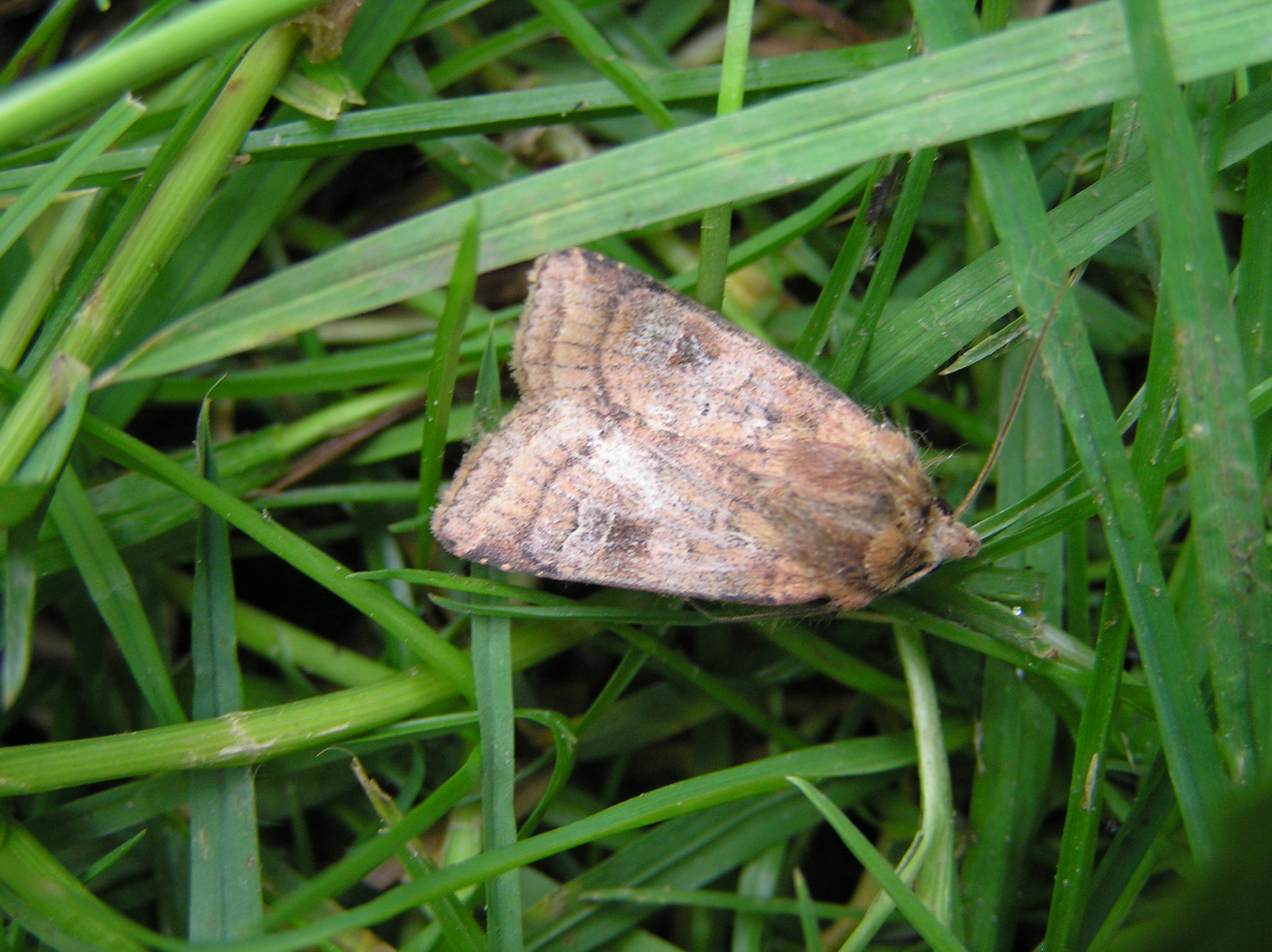

Scientific classification
- Domain: Eukaryota
- Kingdom: Animalia
- Phylum: Arthropoda
- Class: Insecta
- Order: Lepidoptera
- Superfamily: Noctuoidea
- Family: Noctuidae
- Genus: Diarsia
- Species: D. rubi

Binomial name
- Diarsia rubi (Vieweg, 1790)

Synonyms
- Noctua rubi

= Small square-spot =

Species of moth

The small square-spot (Diarsia rubi) is a moth of the family Noctuidae. The species was first described by Karl Friedrich Vieweg in 1790. It is found in Europe apart from the far south-east then east through the Caucasus, Transcaucasia, Central Asia, Siberia, the Russian Far East and Kamchatka.

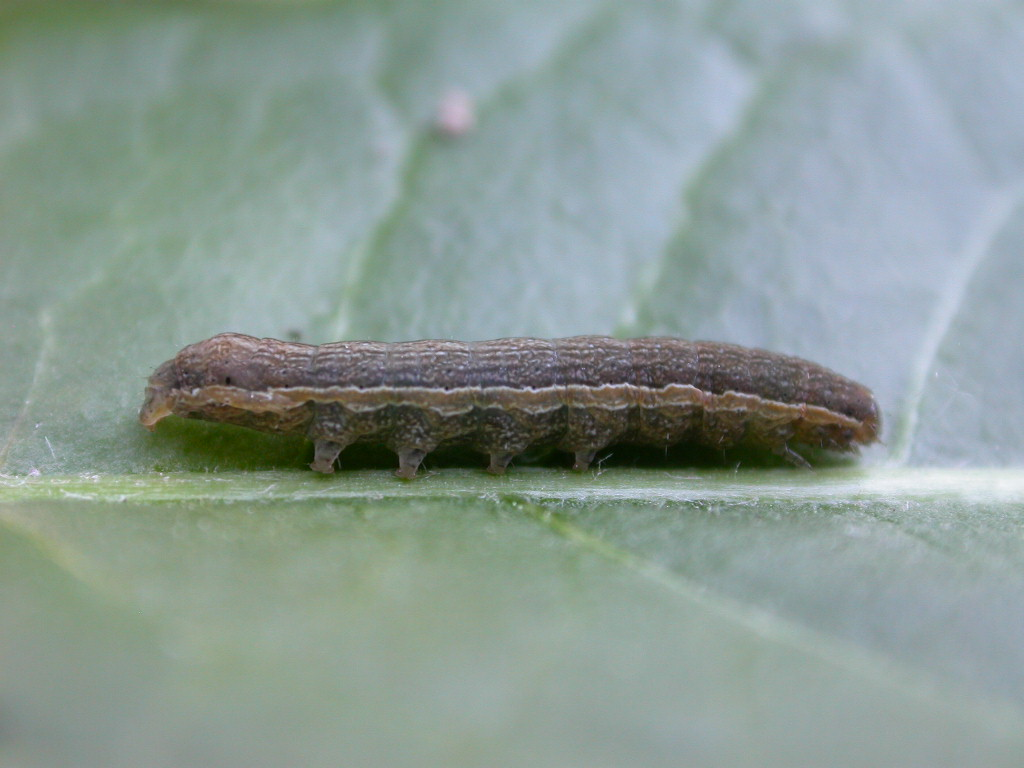
Caterpillar

== Description ==
This is a quite a small species (wingspan 30–38 mm) with dull greyish-pink forewings, varying to red brown, marked with a pale angular mark which gives the species its common name. Forewing with the crosslines and shades olive; the cell brown; reniform with whitish outline; claviform with a dark speck at its end; marginal area dark. The hindwings are pale luteous grey with a pink fringe.

== Biology ==
Two broods are produced each year with the adults flying in May and June and again in August and September. Moths of the second brood are usually smaller and darker than those of the first. The species flies at night and is attracted to light and sugar. It will also visit flowers such as heather and ragwort.

The larva feeds on a variety of plants: Recorded food plants include raspberry, Vaccinium and willow. The species overwinters as a larva.

== Similar species ==
Diarsia rubi is difficult to certainly distinguish from its congeners. See Townsend et al.

- Protolampra sobrina (Duponchel, 1843)
- Diarsia mendica ssp. mendica (Fabricius, 1775)
- Diarsia mendica ssp. thulei (Staudinger, 1891)
- Diarsia mendica ssp. orkneyensis (Bytinski-Salz, 1930)
- Diarsia florida (Schmidt, 1859)
