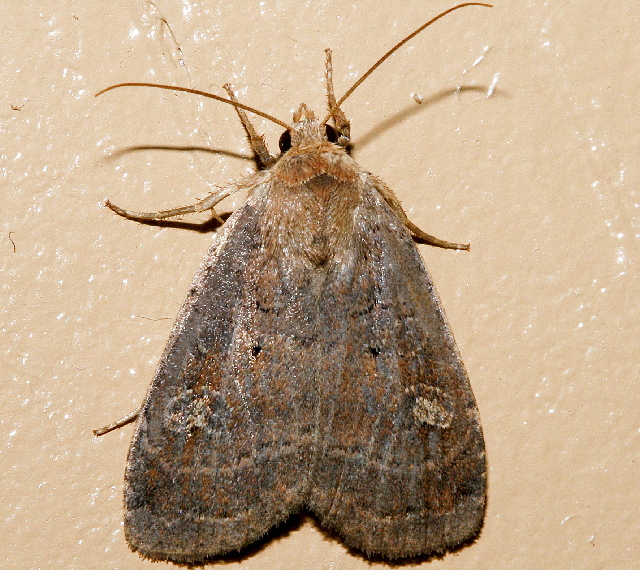

Scientific classification
- Kingdom: Animalia
- Phylum: Arthropoda
- Class: Insecta
- Order: Lepidoptera
- Superfamily: Noctuoidea
- Family: Noctuidae
- Genus: Diarsia
- Species: D. rubifera

Binomial name
- Diarsia rubifera (Grote, 1875)

Synonyms
- Agrotis rubifera Grote, 1875; Noctua cynica Smith, 1898; Noctua perversa (Strand, 1916); Diarsia rubifera perumbrosa (Dyar, 1904)

= Diarsia rubifera =

Red dart

Species of moth

Diarsia rubifera, the red dart, is a moth of the family Noctuidae. It is found from coast to coast and from central and southern Canada and the northern United States. In the east it occurs as far south as western North Carolina, and in the west it has been recorded from south-western Montana and south-western Colorado. It has been recently recorded from Tennessee.

The wingspan is about 29 mm. Adults are on wing from July to August.
