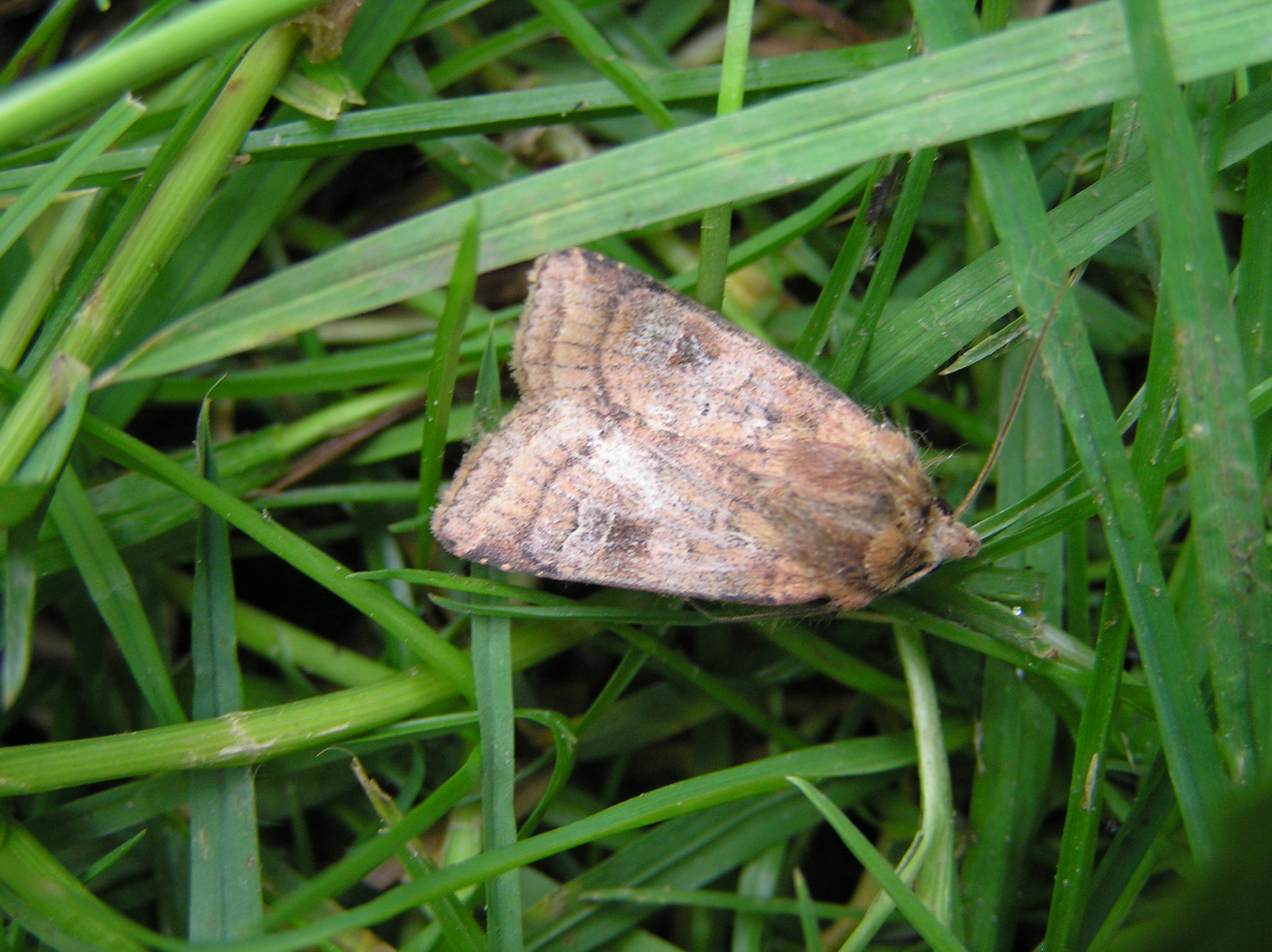
- Diarsia rubi

Scientific classification
- Kingdom: Animalia
- Phylum: Arthropoda
- Clade: Pancrustacea
- Class: Insecta
- Order: Lepidoptera
- Superfamily: Noctuoidea
- Family: Noctuidae
- Subtribe: Noctuina
- Genus: Diarsia; Hübner, [1821]

Synonyms
- Oxira Walker, 1865; Brunnarsia Beck, 1996; Rubarsia Beck, 1996; Menarsia Beck, 1996

= Diarsia =

Genus of moths

Diarsia is a genus of moths of the family Noctuidae.

== Species ==
- The hoenei species group
  - Diarsia acutipennis Boursin, 1954
  - Diarsia caradjai Boursin, 1954
  - Diarsia claudia Boursin, 1963
  - Diarsia excelsa Hreblay et Ronkay, 1998
  - Diarsia fletcheri Boursin, 1969
    - Diarsia fletcheri afghana Boursin, 1969
  - Diarsia guadarramensis (Boursin, 1931)
  - Diarsia hoenei Boursin, 1954
    - Diarsia hoenei nepalensis Hreblay et Ronkay, 1998)
  - Diarsia nyei Boursin, 1969
    - Diarsia nyei ferruginea Chen, 1984
  - Diarsia robusta Boursin, 1954
  - Diarsia vulpina (Moore, 1882)
- The canescens species group
  - Diarsia canescens (Butler, 1878)
- The acharista species group
  - Diarsia acharista Boursin, 1954
  - Diarsia eleuthera Boursin, 1954
  - Diarsia erythropsis Boursin, 1954
  - Diarsia flavibrunnea Leech, 1910
  - Diarsia hypographa Boursin, 1954
  - Diarsia nipponica Ogata, 1957
  - Diarsia odontophora Boursin, 1954
  - Diarsia pseudacharista Boursin, 1954
  - Diarsia unica Plante, 1994
  - Diarsia yoshimotoi Plante, 1994
  - Diarsia ypsiloidea Peregovits et Ronkay, 1999
- The polytaenia species group
  - Diarsia coenostola Boursin, 1954
  - Diarsia polytaenia Boursin, 1954
- The axiologa species group
  - Diarsia axiologa Boursin, 1954
  - Diarsia nebula Boursin, 1954
  - Diarsia orophila Boursin, 1954
  - Diarsia poliophaea Boursin, 1954
- The chalcea species group
  - Diarsia chalcea Boursin, 1954
  - Diarsia cia (Strand, 1919)
  - Diarsia copria Hreblay et Plante, 1995
  - Diarsia mandarinella (Hampson, 1903)
  - Diarsia dichroa Boursin, 1954
  - Diarsia scotodichroa Varga & Ronkay, 2007
  - Diarsia metadichroa Varga & Ronkay, 2007
  - Diarsia gozmanyi Varga & Ronkay, 2007 (Vietnam)
  - Diarsia formosensis (Hampson, 1914)
  - Diarsia dewitzi (Graeser, 1888) (= Diarsia tarda Leech, 1889)
  - Diarsia sinuosa (Wileman, 1912)
- The basistriga-cerastioides-tincta species group
  - Diarsia basistriga (Moore, 1867)
  - Diarsia cerastioides (Moore, 1867)
  - Diarsia griseithorax Warren, 1912
  - Diarsia subtincta Chang, 1991
  - Diarsia tincta (Leech, 1900)
- The erubescens species group
  - Diarsia beckeri Boursin, 1948
  - Diarsia erubescens (Butler, 1880)
  - Diarsia formosana Boursin, 1948
  - Diarsia macrodactyla Boursin, 1954
  - Diarsia pacifica Boursin, 1943
  - Diarsia rubicilia (Moore, 1967)
  - Diarsia ruficauda (Warren, 1909)
  - Diarsia taidactyla Varga & Ronkay, 2007
- The stictica species group
  - Diarsia carnipennis B.S.Chang, 1991
  - Diarsia stictica (Poujade, 1887)
- The arenosoides species group
  - Diarsia arenosoides Poole, 1989
- The nigrosigna species group
  - Diarsia deparca (Butler, 1879) (= Diarsia takamukui Matsumura, 1926)
  - Diarsia nigrosigna (Moore, 1881)
  - Diarsia postpallida (Prout, 1928)
- The albipennis species group
  - Diarsia albipennis (Butler, 1889)
  - Diarsia nigrafasciata B.S.Chang, 1991
- The mendica species group
  - Diarsia mendica – ingrailed clay (Fabricius, 1775)
  - Diarsia obuncula Hampson, 1903
  - Diarsia henrici (Corti et Draudt, 1933) (= Diarsia diorismena Boursin, 1948)
  - Diarsia rubifera (Grote, 1875)
  - Diarsia dislocata (Smith, 1904)
  - Diarsia jucunda (Walker, [1857])
- The esurialis species group
  - Diarsia calgary (Smith, 1898)
  - Diarsia esurialis (Grote, 1881)
- The rubi species group
  - Diarsia florida – fen square spot (Schmidt, 1859)
  - Diarsia rosaria (Grote, 1878)
  - Diarsia rubi – small square-spot (Vieweg, 1790)
- The torva species group
  - Diarsia metatorva Varga & Ronkay, 2007
  - Diarsia torva (Corti et Draudt, 1933) (= Diarsia stenoptera Boursin, 1948)
- The dahlii species group
  - Diarsia dahlii – barred chestnut (Hübner, [1813])
  - Diarsia protodahlii Varga & Ronkay, 2007
- The fannyi species group
  - Diarsia fannyi (Corti et Draudt, 1933)
- The brunnea species group
  - Diarsia brunnea – purple clay ([Schiffermüller], 1775)
- Unknown species group
  - Diarsia banksi Holloway, 1976
  - Diarsia barlowi Holloway, 1976
  - Diarsia borneochracea Holloway, 1989
  - Diarsia dimorpha (Wileman & West, 1928)
  - Diarsia flavostigma Holloway, 1976
  - Diarsia gaudens (Hampson, 1905)
  - Diarsia intermixta (Guenée, 1852)
  - Diarsia javanica Boursin, 1959
  - Diarsia kebeae (Walker, 1908)
  - Diarsia latimacula Kozhanchikov, 1937
  - Diarsia magnisigna (Prout, 1922)
    - Diarsia magnisigna angusta (Prout, 1922)
  - Diarsia ochracea (Walker, 1865)
  - Diarsia olivacea (Prout, 1922)
  - Diarsia owgarra (Walker, 1908)
  - Diarsia pallens Chen, 1993
  - Diarsia pallidimargo (Prout, 1922)
  - Diarsia pallidisigna (Prout, 1922)
  - Diarsia pediciliata (Prout, 1924)
    - Diarsia pediciliata melanomma (Prout, 1926)
  - Diarsia pseudobarlowi Holloway, 1989
  - Diarsia ruptistriga (Walker, 1858)
  - Diarsia sciera Chen, 1993
  - Diarsia serrata Holloway, 1976
  - Diarsia tibetica Chen, 1994
  - Diarsia stigmatias (Prout, 1924)
