= Diarsia ochracea =

Scientific classification
- Kingdom: Animalia
- Phylum: Arthropoda
- Class: Insecta
- Order: Lepidoptera
- Superfamily: Noctuoidea
- Family: Noctuidae
- Genus: Diarsia
- Species: D. ochracea

Binomial name
- Diarsia ochracea (Walker, 1865)

Synonyms
- Oxiara ochracea Walker, 1865; Oxira ochracea Walker 1865

Species of moth

Diarsia ochracea is a moth of the family Noctuidae. It is found in Sri Lanka. It is found where tea is cultivated.

== Description ==
Its wingspan is about 41 mm. It is an ochreous-greyish-brown or reddish-brown moth. Palpi dark at sides. Forewings with double subbasal and antemedial waved lines. The orbicular and reniform stigmata large in some specimen with a black spot between them and a triangular black spot before orbicular, the reniform often filled in chestnut colour. There is a diffused angled medial fuscous band. A double lunulate curved postmedial line present. A submarginal pale line and marginal crenulate dark line can be seen. Hindwings are fuscous brown or reddish brown.
