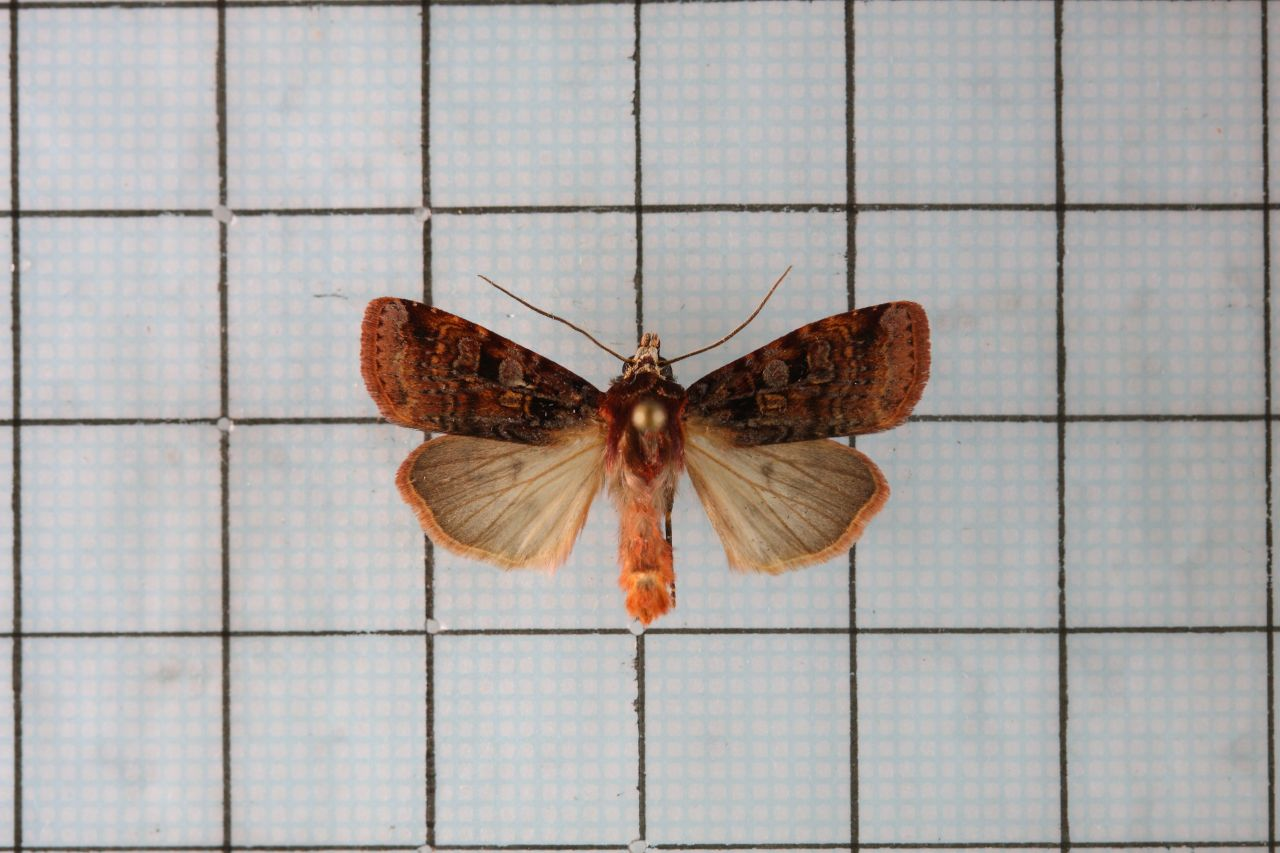

Scientific classification
- Domain: Eukaryota
- Kingdom: Animalia
- Phylum: Arthropoda
- Class: Insecta
- Order: Lepidoptera
- Superfamily: Noctuoidea
- Family: Noctuidae
- Genus: Diarsia
- Species: D. formosana

Binomial name
- Diarsia formosana Boursin, 1948

= Diarsia formosana =

Species of moth

Diarsia formosana is a moth of the family Noctuidae. It is found in Taiwan.
