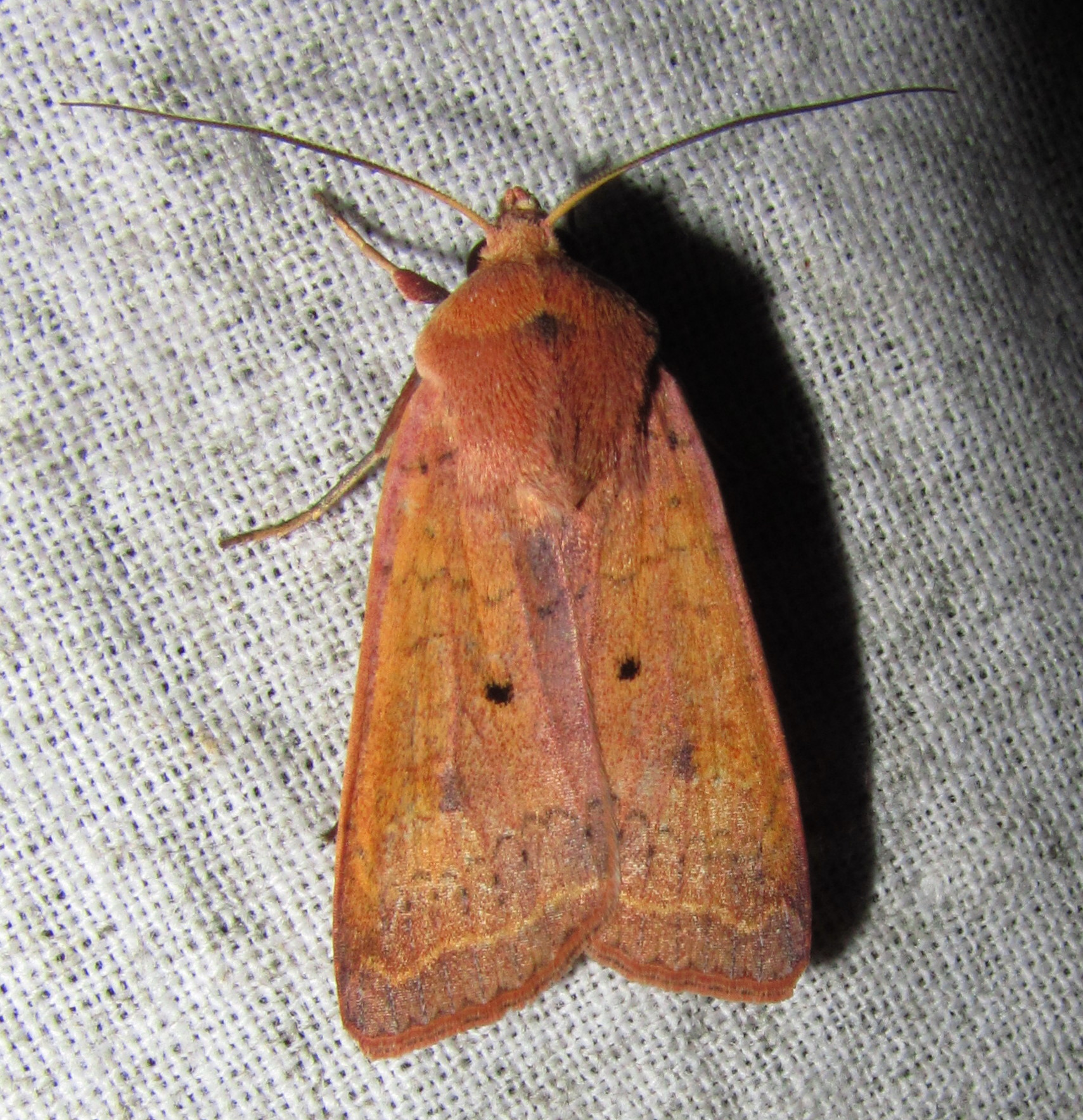

Scientific classification
- Domain: Eukaryota
- Kingdom: Animalia
- Phylum: Arthropoda
- Class: Insecta
- Order: Lepidoptera
- Superfamily: Noctuoidea
- Family: Noctuidae
- Genus: Diarsia
- Species: D. nigrosigna

Binomial name
- Diarsia nigrosigna (Moore, 1881)

Synonyms
- Graphiphora nigrosigna Moore, 1881; Chera efflorescens Hampson, 1891; Chera erubescens Hampson, 1891; Rhyacia subochracea Corti & Draudt, 1933; Agrotis nigrosigna postpallida Prout, 1928

= Diarsia nigrosigna =

Species of moth

Diarsia nigrosigna is a moth of the family Noctuidae. It is found in the north-eastern parts of the Himalaya, from China to Sundaland, the Philippines and Sulawesi.
