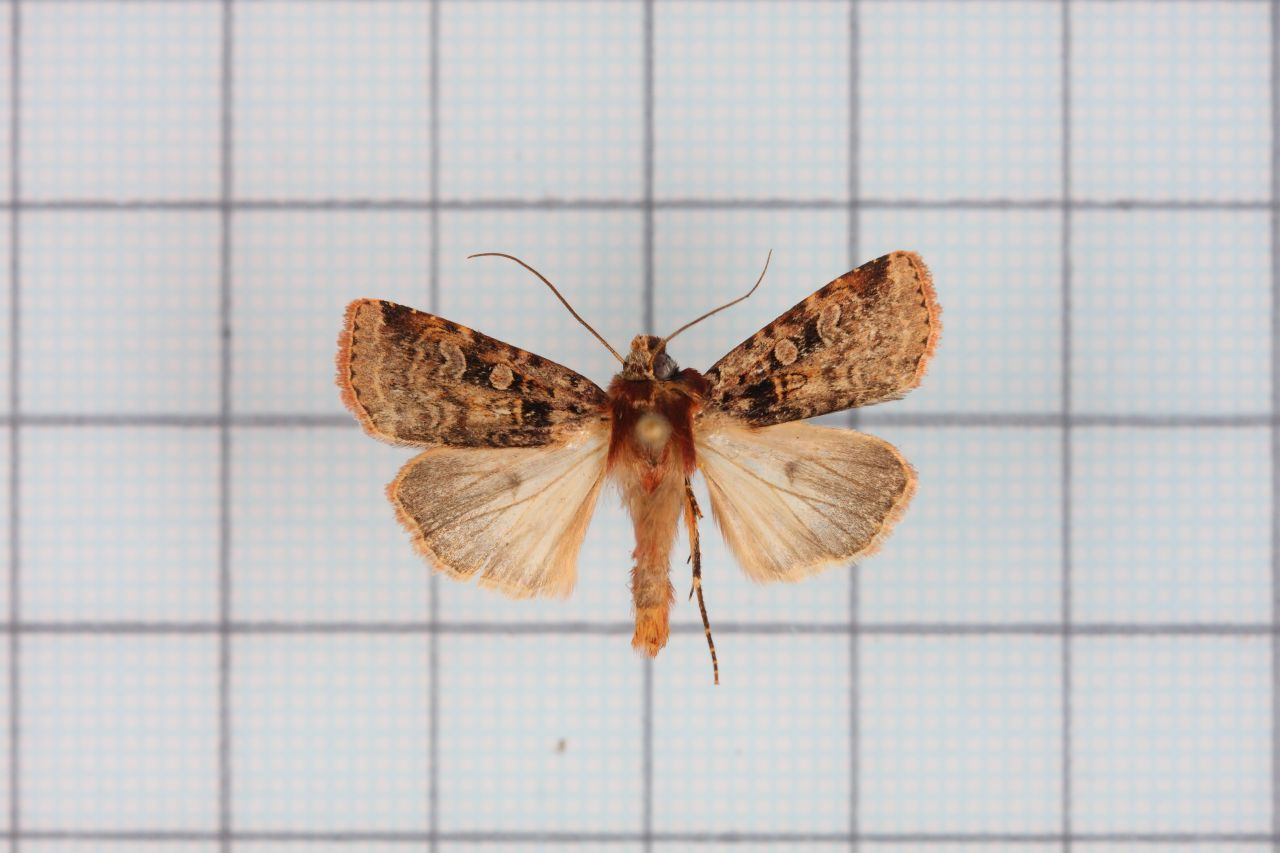

Scientific classification
- Kingdom: Animalia
- Phylum: Arthropoda
- Class: Insecta
- Order: Lepidoptera
- Superfamily: Noctuoidea
- Family: Noctuidae
- Genus: Diarsia
- Species: D. formosensis

Binomial name
- Diarsia formosensis (Hampson, 1914)

Synonyms
- Agrotis formosensis Hampson, 1914; Diarsia moltrechti Boursin, 1948

= Diarsia formosensis =

Species of moth

Diarsia formosensis is a moth of the family Noctuidae. It is found in Taiwan.

The wingspan is 28–33 mm.
