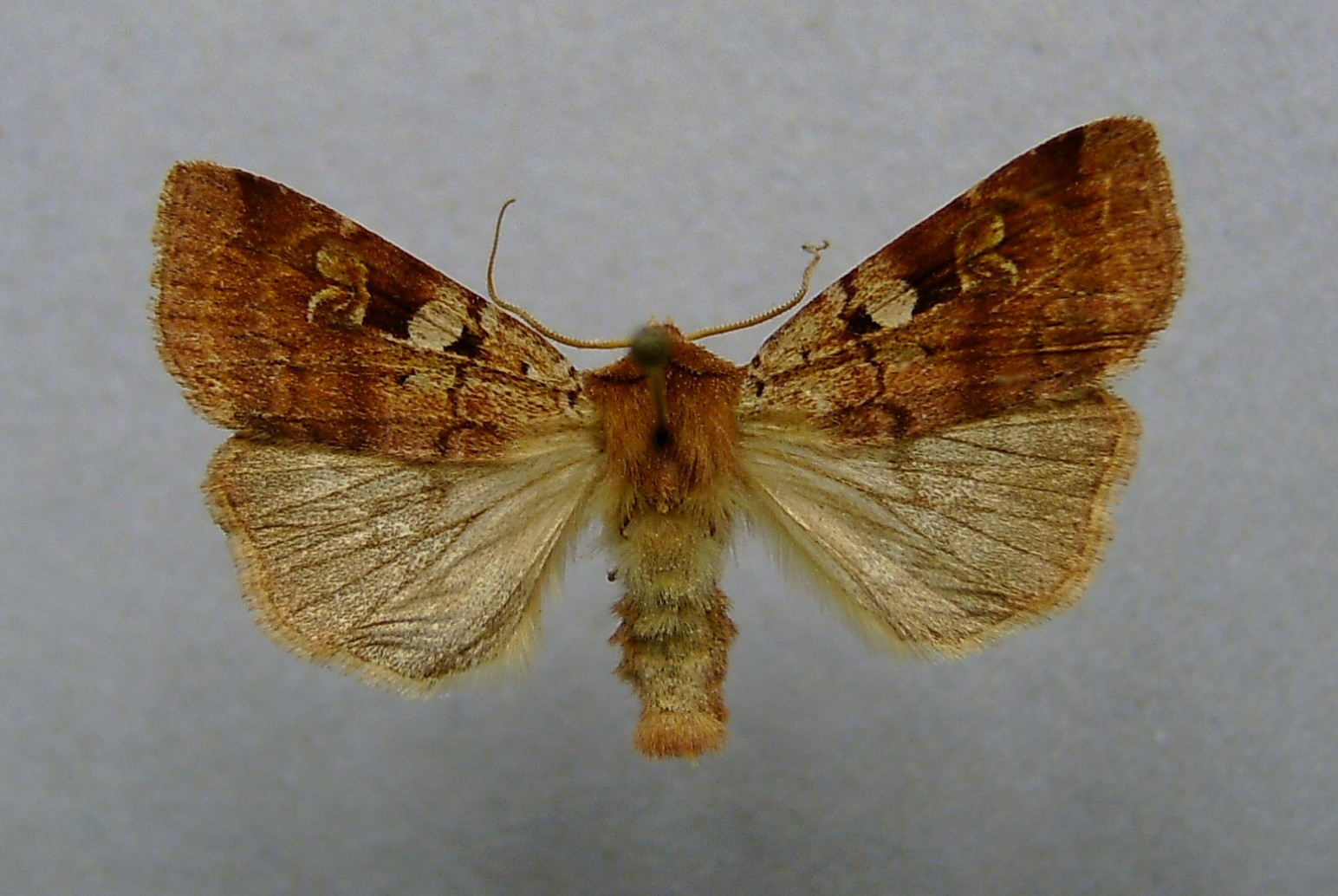

Scientific classification
- Domain: Eukaryota
- Kingdom: Animalia
- Phylum: Arthropoda
- Class: Insecta
- Order: Lepidoptera
- Superfamily: Noctuoidea
- Family: Noctuidae
- Genus: Diarsia
- Species: D. mendica

Binomial name
- Diarsia mendica (Fabricius, 1775)

= Ingrailed clay =

Species of moth

The ingrailed clay (Diarsia mendica) is a moth of the family Noctuidae. The species was first described by Johan Christian Fabricius in 1775. It is distributed through most of Europe and the Palearctic.

This species occurs in a huge range of colours and is one of the most variable species in the family. Its forewings range in colour from very pale straw to very dark brown, with the pale forms predominant in the south of the range and the darker forms prevalent further north.

== Description ==
The wingspan is 28–36 mm. "Forewing with basal area grey, outer area red-brown; the lines and stigmata grey; hindwing dull grey with a dark lunule and transverse line and the fringe reddish; as a rule the male is paler than the female; a very variable species alike in colour and plainness of markings; ab. congener Hbn. is wholly red-brown with the stigmata yellowish; -ab. subrufa Haw. is distinguished by having the cell dark at base and between the stigmata; — ab. conflua H.-S. nec Tr. has the ground colour reddish ochreous mottled with darker; — ab. mendica F. is like the last but shows black or dark brown spaces in the cell; — ab. ignicola H.-Sch. has the ground colour yellowish ochreous, with the markings distinct; — primulae Esp. is the same form but with the cell filled in with blackish; — ab. ochrea-virgata Tutt is a banded form, the whole space between the median and subterminal line being darker; — ab. grisea Tutt is a small dark grey form, the stigmata clear; — ab. coerulea Tutt is of a clear slaty or lilac colour with pale stigmata; — lastly, ab. lamentanda Alph. is a pale uniformly ochreous form from Siberia and Kamschatka . subsp. conflua Tr. (= thulei Stgr.)is smaller, with narrower, more pointed forewing, reddish brown varied with yellowish; the stigmata large with dark marks in cell; described originally from Iceland and occurring in Shetland and Lapland; — ab. borealis Zett. is a grey brown form without any red but with the cell blackish; obsoleta Tutt resembles borealis, but the cell is unicolorous and the markings obscure; - ab. diducta Zett. has the forewing grey with a broad rusty-testaceous fascia, and the markings obscured.

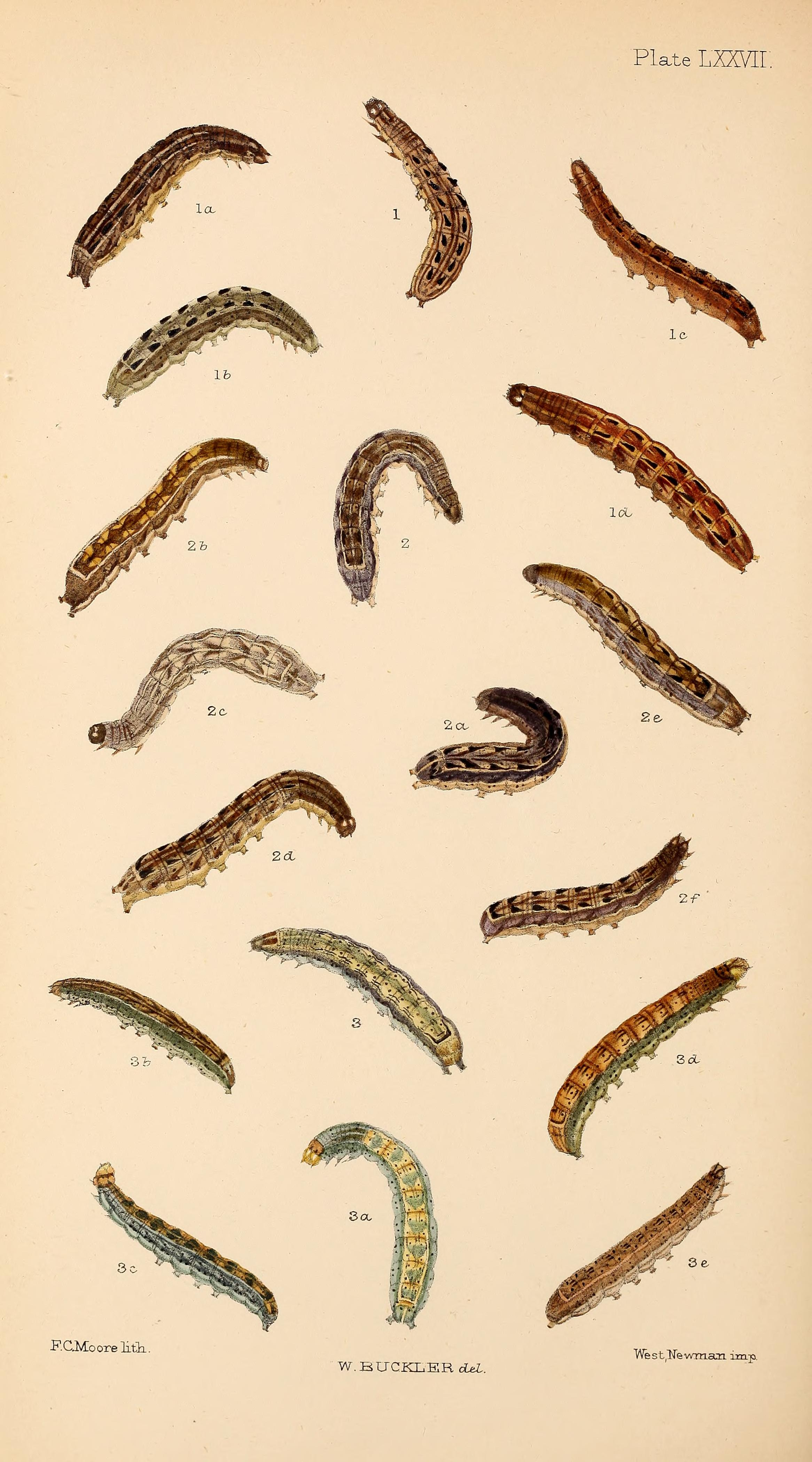
Figs 1-1d, 2-2f larvae after final moult

The larva is brown with black triangular markings along the side. It feeds on a wide range of plants (see list below). The species overwinters as a larva.

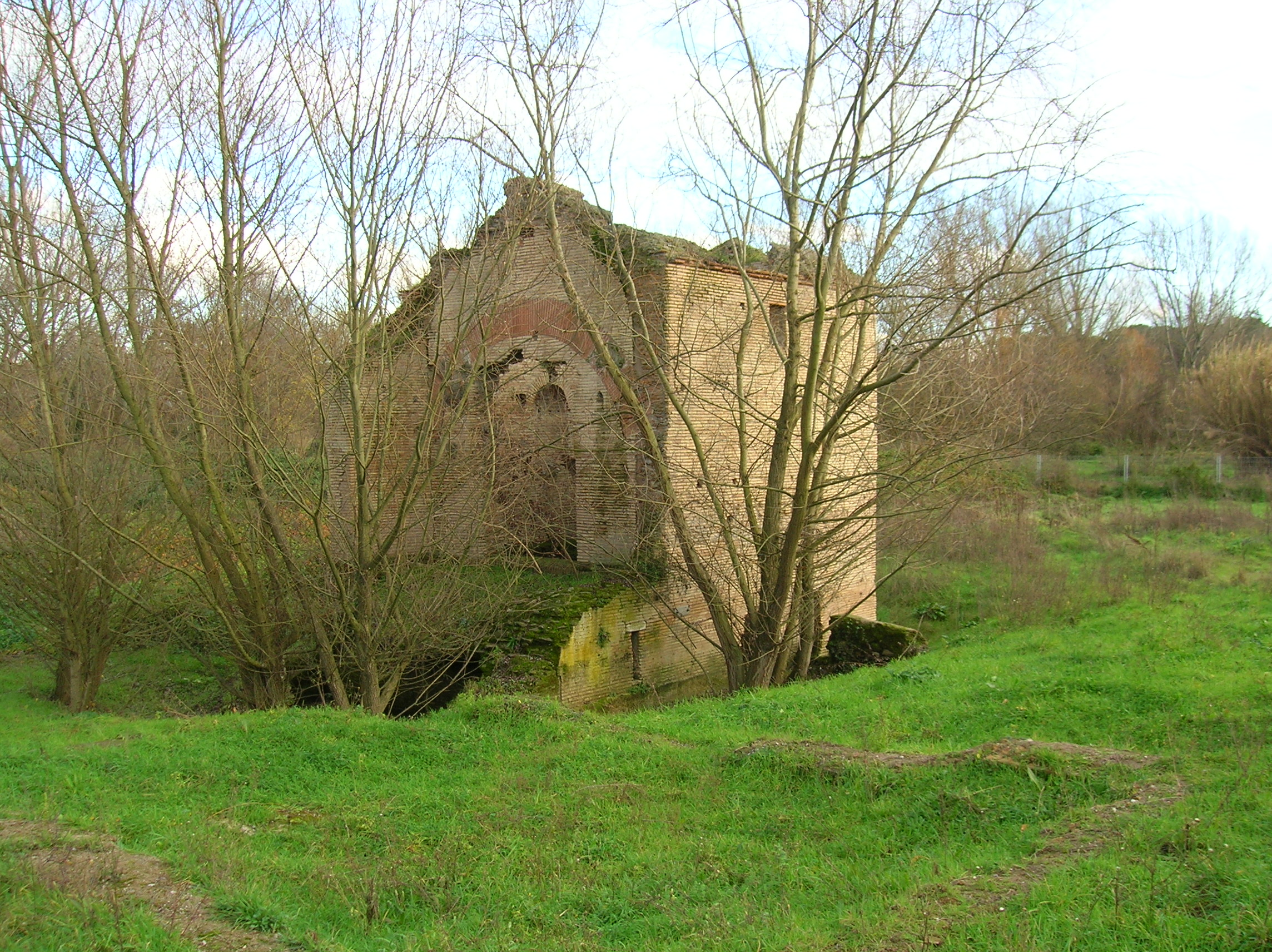
Habitat in Rome, Italy

== Biology ==
This moth flies at night from June to August and is attracted to light.

== Recorded food plants ==
- Calluna – heather
- Campanula – harebell
- Crataegus – hawthorn
- Lactuca – lettuce
- Pinaceae
- Rubus – bramble
- Rumex – dock
- Salix – willow
- Vaccinium

See Robinson, G. S. et al.

== Subspecies ==
- D. m. borealis - Scandinavia, northern and central Russia, Iceland
- D. m. mendica - central and northern Europe, except in northernmost Fennoscandia
- D. m. orkneyensis - Orkney
- D. m. thulei - Shetland
- D. m. lamentunda- Siberia, Kamchatka, Mongolia, China and Tibet
- D. m. monochroma - Alborz and other ragions of Iran
- undescribed subspecies in the north of Turkey, Armenia, the Caucasus and other regions of Transcaucasia

== Similar species ==
Diarsia mendica ssp. mendica (Fabricius, 1775) is difficult to certainly distinguish from its congeners. See Townsend et al.

- Protolampra sobrina (Duponchel, 1843)
- Diarsia mendica ssp. thulei (Staudinger, 1891)
- Diarsia mendica ssp. orkneyensis (Bytinski-Salz, 1930)
- Diarsia rubi (Vieweg, 1790)
- Diarsia florida (Schmidt, 1859)

== Notes ==
1. The flight season refers to the British Isles. This may vary in other parts of the range.
