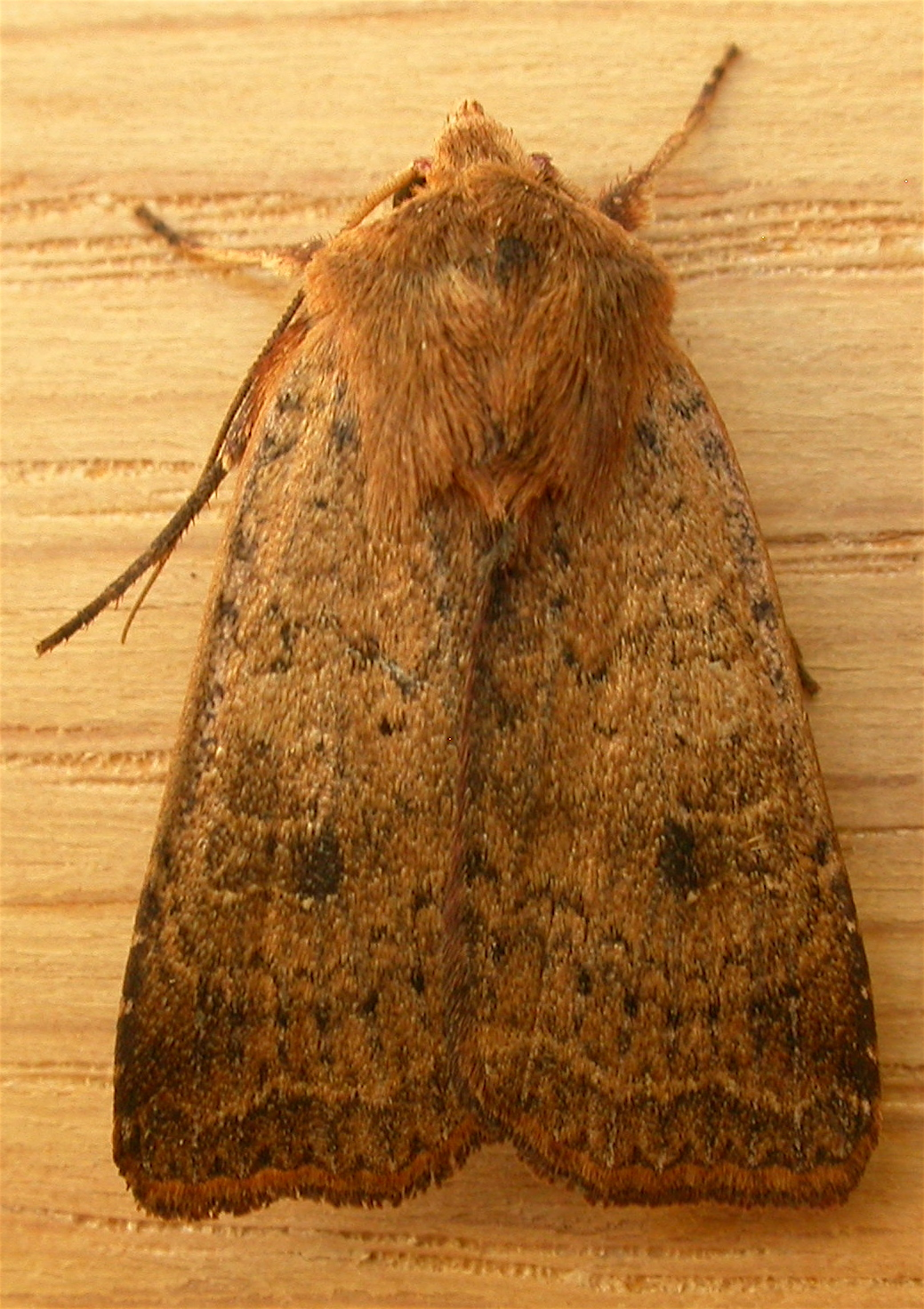

Scientific classification
- Domain: Eukaryota
- Kingdom: Animalia
- Phylum: Arthropoda
- Class: Insecta
- Order: Lepidoptera
- Superfamily: Noctuoidea
- Family: Noctuidae
- Genus: Diarsia
- Species: D. intermixta

Binomial name
- Diarsia intermixta Guenée, 1852

Synonyms
- Graphiphora compta

= Diarsia intermixta =

Species of moth

Diarsia intermixta, also known as the orange peel moth, is a species of moth in the family Noctuidae. It is found from Queensland to Tasmania in Australia, as well as in New Zealand, and islands in the south Pacific.

The larvae feed on nettles, Sinapis alba, Arctotheca calendula, Histiopteris incisa, Pteridium esculentum, and is considered a pest on Brassica rapa. Adults are on the wing in summer and autumn.
