= Diarsia stictica =

Scientific classification
- Kingdom: Animalia
- Phylum: Arthropoda
- Class: Insecta
- Order: Lepidoptera
- Superfamily: Noctuoidea
- Family: Noctuidae
- Genus: Diarsia
- Species: D. stictica

Binomial name
- Diarsia stictica (Poujade, 1887)

Synonyms
- Agrotis stictica Poujade, 1887; Graphiphora viaria Swinhoe, 1889

Species of moth

Diarsia stictica is a moth of the family Noctuidae. It is found in India, western China and Borneo.
