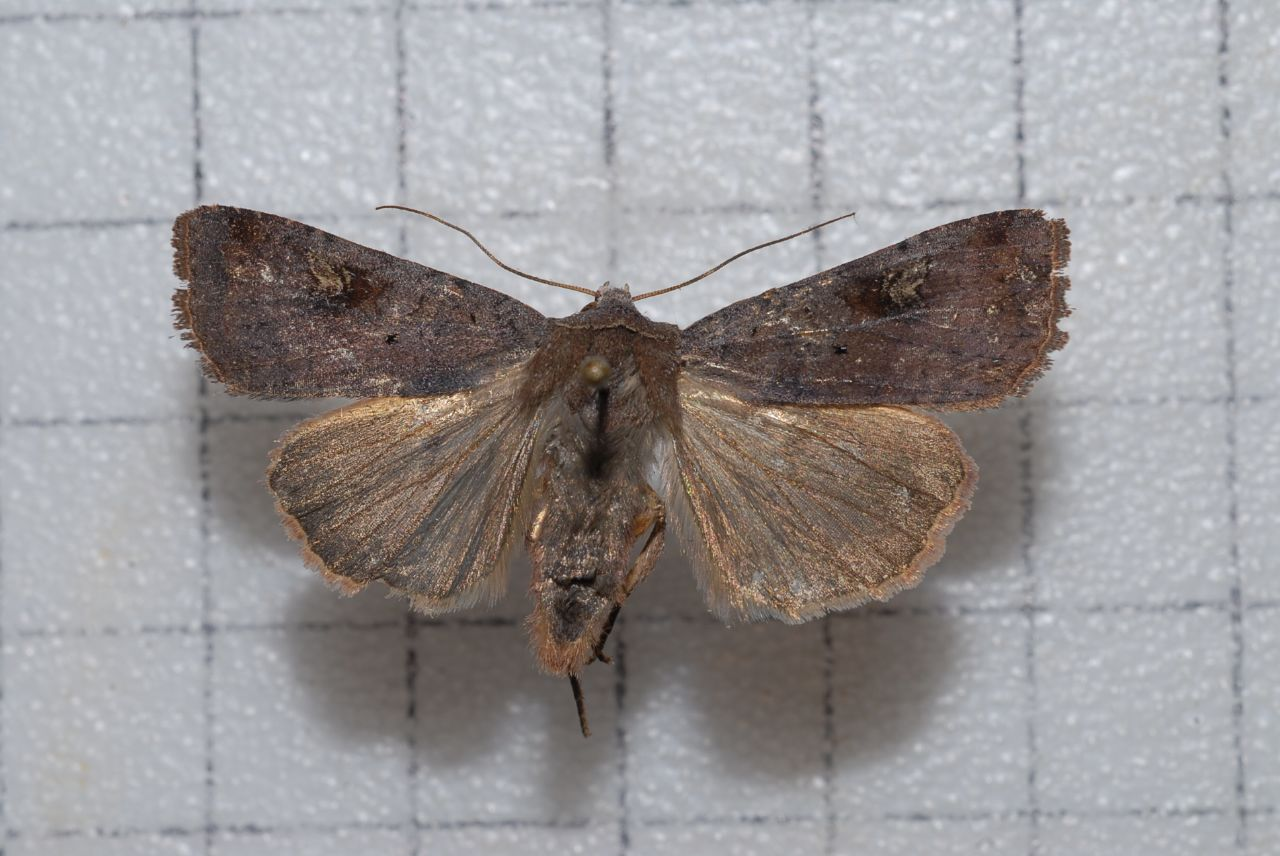

Scientific classification
- Kingdom: Animalia
- Phylum: Arthropoda
- Class: Insecta
- Order: Lepidoptera
- Superfamily: Noctuoidea
- Family: Noctuidae
- Genus: Diarsia
- Species: D. canescens

Binomial name
- Diarsia canescens (Butler, 1878)

Synonyms
- Graphiphora canescens Butler, 1878; Lycophotia brunnescens Hampson, 1903; Rhyacia ishidella Matsumura, 1926; Rhyacia subcanescens Corti & Draudt, 1933; Cerastis subdolens Butler, 1881

= Diarsia canescens =

Species of moth

Diarsia canescens is a moth of the family Noctuidae. It is found from southern Siberia and Mongolia to the Ussuri region and Sachalin to the east and from the Kurili Islands through China to the southern Himalayas, Taiwan and northern Indochina to the south. It has recently been recorded from Syria.

The wingspan is 38–45 mm.
