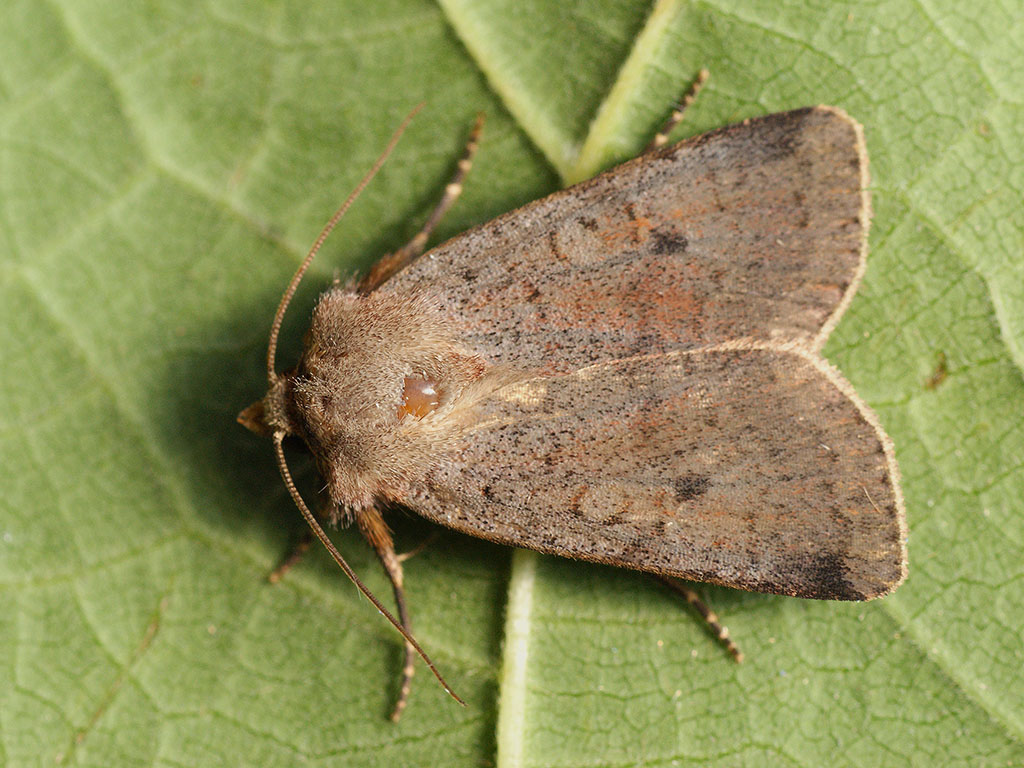

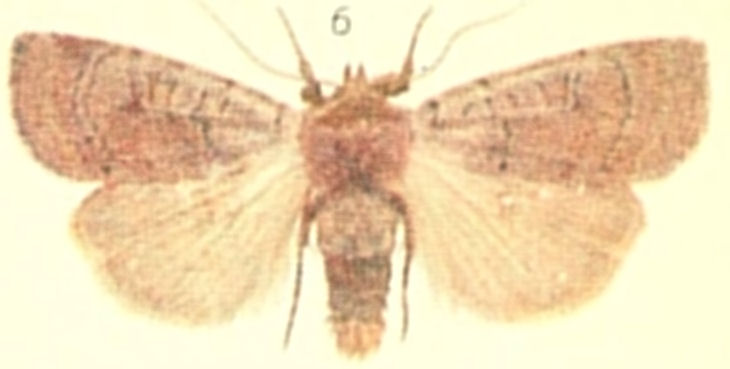

Scientific classification
- Domain: Eukaryota
- Kingdom: Animalia
- Phylum: Arthropoda
- Class: Insecta
- Order: Lepidoptera
- Superfamily: Noctuoidea
- Family: Noctuidae
- Genus: Protolampra
- Species: P. sobrina

Binomial name
- Protolampra sobrina (Duponchel, 1843)

Synonyms
- Noctua sobrina Duponchel, 1843; Noctua mista Freyer, [1844]; Noctua lapponica Freyer, 1845; Noctua gruneri Guenée, 1852; Noctua suffusa Tutt, 1892

= Protolampra sobrina =

Species of moth

Protolampra sobrina, the cousin german, is a moth of the family Noctuidae. The species was first described by Philogène Auguste Joseph Duponchel in 1843. It is found in most of Europe, then east across the Palearctic to Siberia, Altai, Irkutsk, Kamchatka and Korea.

The wingspan is 34–39 mm. Meyrick describes it - Antennae in male shortly ciliated. Head deep ferruginous-reddish. Forewings rather dark purplish-brown; lines very indistinctly darker-margined, median shade faintly darker; orbicular and reniform indistinctly outlined with darker, lower end of reniform darker; subterminal line somewhat paler. Hindwings light fuscous, darker terminally. Larva brown-reddish; sides grey-freckled; dorsal and subspiracular lines pale; dots minute, black; head brownish ochreous.

== Similar species ==
Protolampra sobrina is difficult to certainly distinguish from its congeners. See Townsend et al.

- Diarsia mendica ssp. mendica (Fabricius, 1775)
- Diarsia mendica ssp. thulei (Staudinger, 1891)
- Diarsia mendica ssp. orkneyensis (Bytinski-Salz, 1930)
- Diarsia rubi (Vieweg, 1790)
- Diarsia florida (Schmidt, 1859)

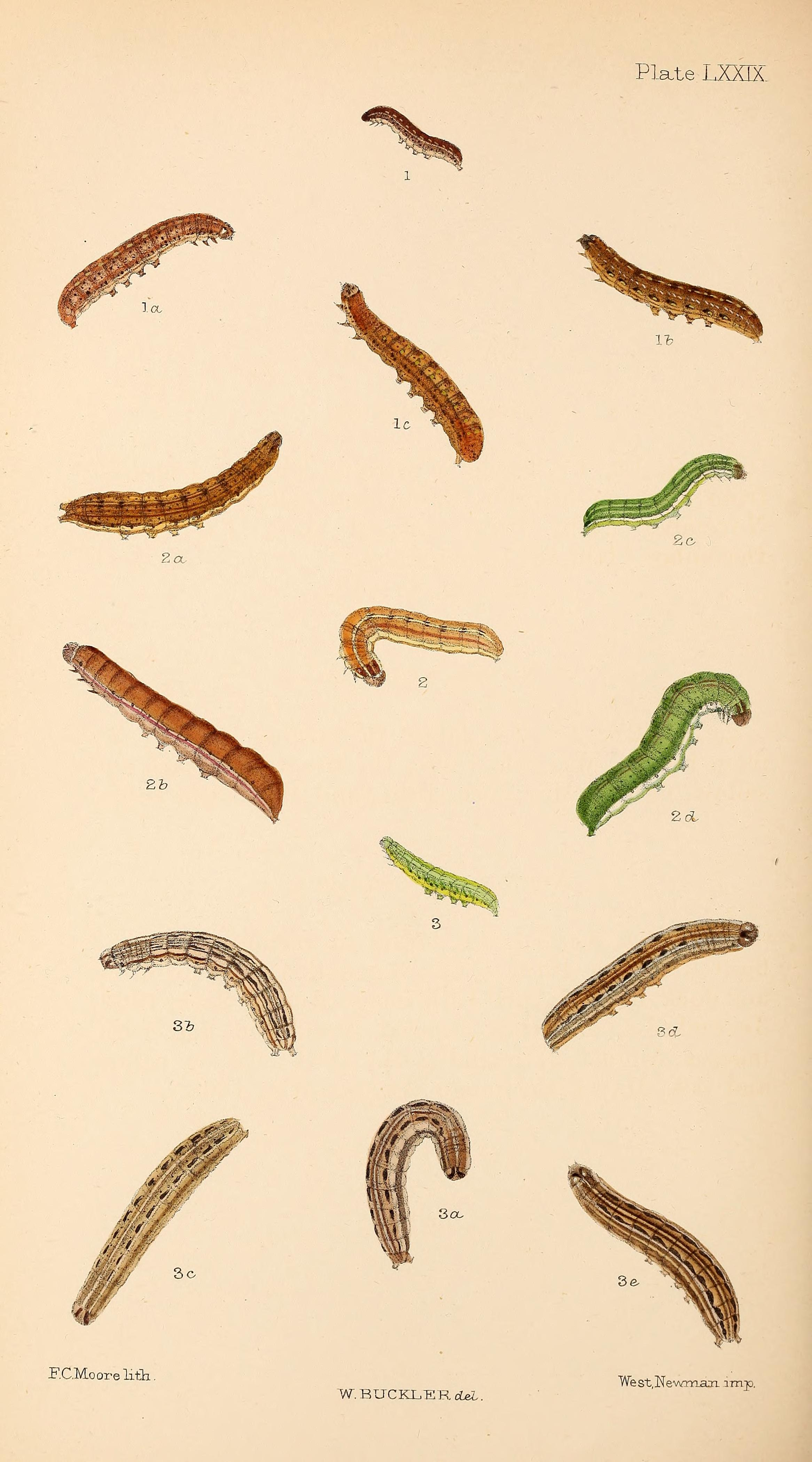
Figs. 1, 1a, 1b, 1c larvae in various stages

The larvae feed on Rosa acicularis, Sorbus aucuparia, Calluna vulgaris and Vaccinium uliginosum. Adults are on wing from July to August.
