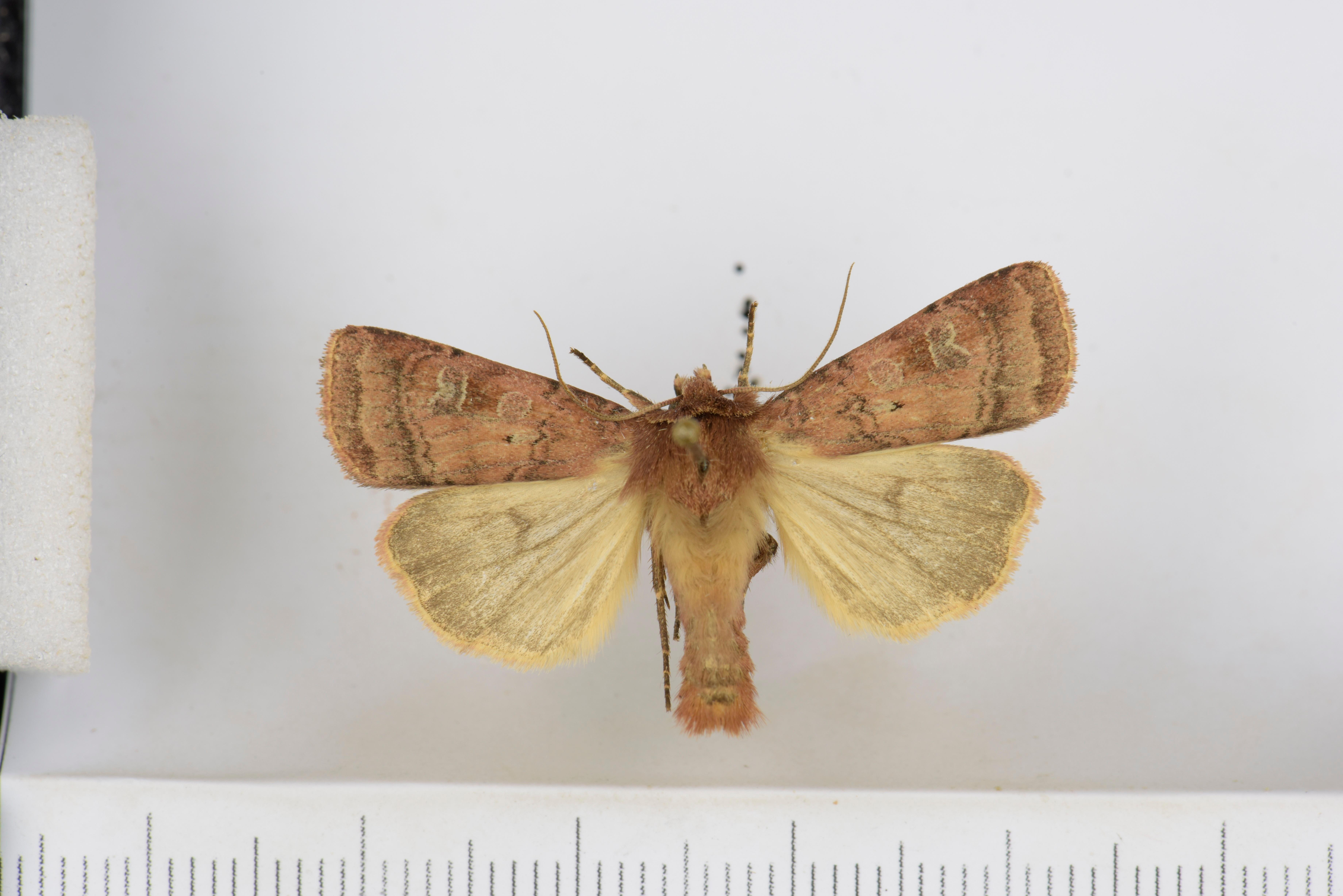

Scientific classification
- Kingdom: Animalia
- Phylum: Arthropoda
- Class: Insecta
- Order: Lepidoptera
- Superfamily: Noctuoidea
- Family: Noctuidae
- Genus: Diarsia
- Species: D. florida

Binomial name
- Diarsia florida (Schmidt, 1859)

Synonyms
- Noctua florida Schmidt, 1859

= Diarsia florida =

Fen square-spot

Species of moth

Diarsia florida, the fen square-spot, is a moth of the family Noctuidae. The species was first described by Schmidt in 1859. It is found from western Europe, Denmark, southern Norway and southern Sweden, east to Romania and Siberia. Subspecies perturbata is found in south-eastern Turkey.

The wingspan is about 34 mm. The ab. florida Schmidt (10 c) appears to be only a brightly coloured and well-marked form [ of Diarsia rubi ]. It may be a fenland ecotype of rubi.

The larvae feed on Athyrium, Betula, Calluna, Caltha, Lamium, Primula, Rubus, Rumex, Scrophularia, Struthiopteryx, Vaccinium and Urtica species.

== Subspecies ==
- Diarsia florida florida
- Diarsia florida perturbata (south-eastern Turkey)

== Similar species ==
Diarsia florida is difficult to certainly distinguish from its congeners. See Townsend et al.

- Protolampra sobrina (Duponchel, 1843)
- Diarsia mendica ssp. mendica (Fabricius, 1775)
- Diarsia mendica ssp. thulei (Staudinger, 1891)
- Diarsia mendica ssp. orkneyensis (Bytinski-Salz, 1930)
- Diarsia rubi (Vieweg, 1790)
