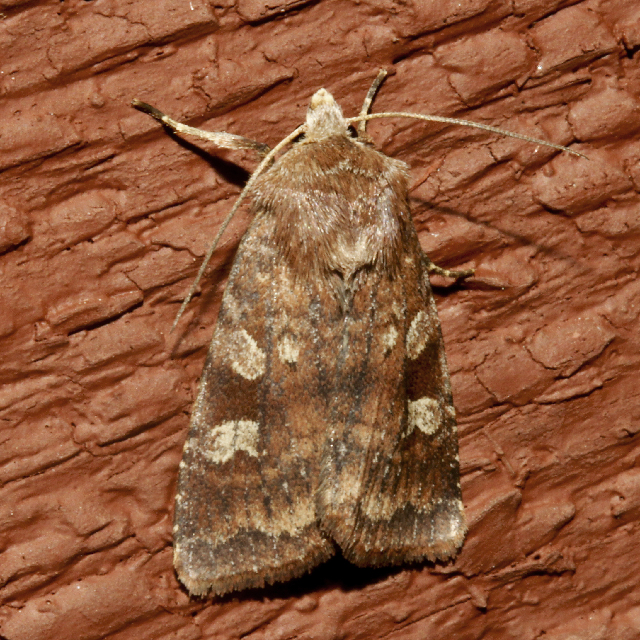

Scientific classification
- Kingdom: Animalia
- Phylum: Arthropoda
- Class: Insecta
- Order: Lepidoptera
- Superfamily: Noctuoidea
- Family: Noctuidae
- Genus: Diarsia
- Species: D. rosaria

Binomial name
- Diarsia rosaria (Grote, 1878)

Synonyms
- Agrotis rosaria Grote, 1878; Diarsia pseudorosaria Hardwick, 1950; Diarsia freemani Hardwick, 1950

= Diarsia rosaria =

Rosy dart

Species of moth

Diarsia rosaria, the rosy dart, is a moth of the family Noctuidae. It is found from Ontario, Quebec, New Brunswick, Nova Scotia, Newfoundland and Labrador, British Columbia, Alberta, Saskatchewan and Yukon in Canada, south to northern California and eastern Oregon.

It is abundant and widely distributed in wet conifer forests.

Its wingspan is about 30 millimeters (1.2 in). Its larvae feed on various grasses.

== Subspecies ==
- Diarsia rosaria rosaria (Grote, 1878)
- Diarsia rosaria freemani Hardwick, 1950

== See also ==
- Xestia oblata – another noctuid known as the rosy dart
