= Diarsia flavostigma =

Scientific classification
- Kingdom: Animalia
- Phylum: Arthropoda
- Clade: Pancrustacea
- Class: Insecta
- Order: Lepidoptera
- Superfamily: Noctuoidea
- Family: Noctuidae
- Genus: Diarsia
- Species: D. flavostigma

Binomial name
- Diarsia flavostigma Holloway, 1976

Species of moth

Diarsia flavostigma is a moth of the family Noctuidae. It is endemic to Borneo and possibly Sumatra.
