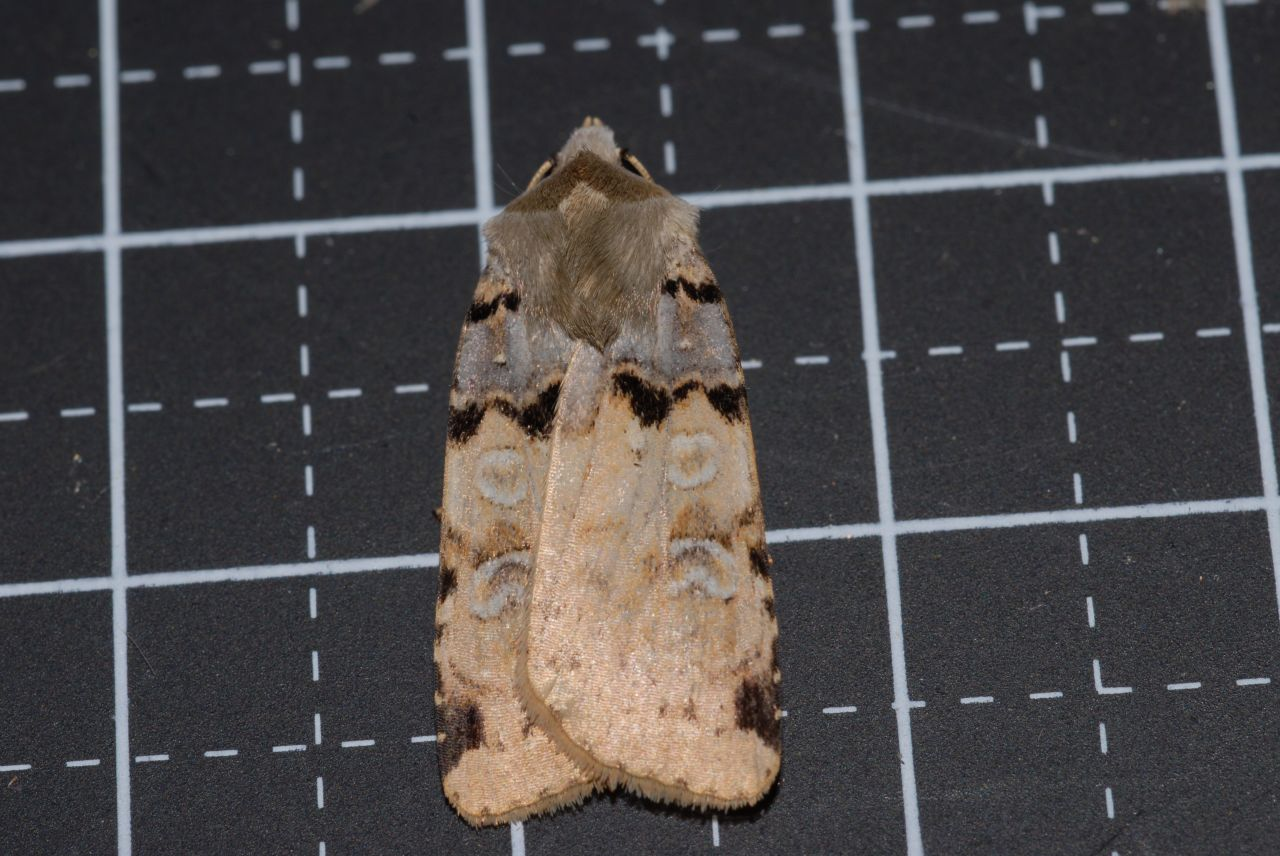

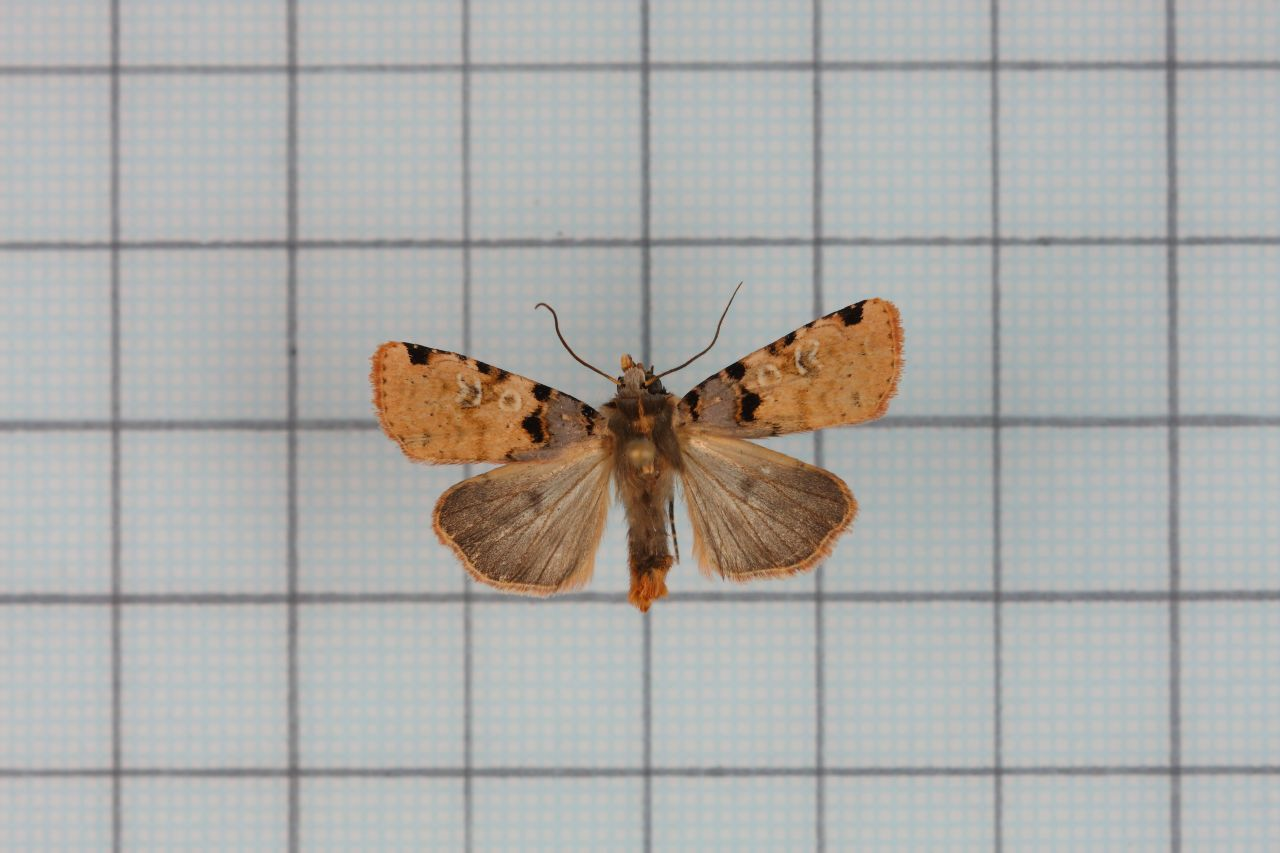

Scientific classification
- Domain: Eukaryota
- Kingdom: Animalia
- Phylum: Arthropoda
- Class: Insecta
- Order: Lepidoptera
- Superfamily: Noctuoidea
- Family: Noctuidae
- Genus: Diarsia
- Species: D. sinuosa

Binomial name
- Diarsia sinuosa (Wileman, 1912)

Synonyms
- Hermonassa sinuosa Wileman, 1912

= Diarsia sinuosa =

Species of moth

Diarsia sinuosa is a moth of the family Noctuidae. It is found in Taiwan.

The wingspan is 26–30 mm.
