= Diarsia dimorpha =

Scientific classification
- Domain: Eukaryota
- Kingdom: Animalia
- Phylum: Arthropoda
- Class: Insecta
- Order: Lepidoptera
- Superfamily: Noctuoidea
- Family: Noctuidae
- Genus: Diarsia
- Species: D. dimorpha

Binomial name
- Diarsia dimorpha (Wileman & West, 1928)

Synonyms
- Oxira dimorpha Wileman & West, 1928

Species of moth

Diarsia dimorpha is a moth of the family Noctuidae. It is endemic to Luzon and has also been found in Borneo.

It was first described by Alfred Ernest Wileman and West in 1928.
