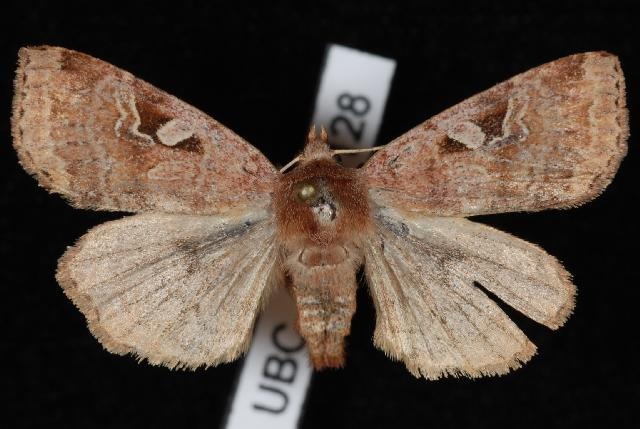

Scientific classification
- Kingdom: Animalia
- Phylum: Arthropoda
- Class: Insecta
- Order: Lepidoptera
- Superfamily: Noctuoidea
- Family: Noctuidae
- Genus: Diarsia
- Species: D. esurialis

Binomial name
- Diarsia esurialis (Grote, 1881)

Synonyms
- Agrotis esurialis Grote, 1881; Diarsia ucluetei

= Diarsia esurialis =

Species of moth

Diarsia esurialis is a moth of the family Noctuidae. It is found from Alaska and British Columbia, south to Washington, Oregon and California.

It is abundant in wet coastal forests.

The wingspan is about 33 mm. Adults are on wing in midsummer.

The larvae feed on the foliage of Corylus and Alnus.
