= Diarsia dislocata =

Dislocated dart

Scientific classification
- Kingdom: Animalia
- Phylum: Arthropoda
- Clade: Pancrustacea
- Class: Insecta
- Order: Lepidoptera
- Superfamily: Noctuoidea
- Family: Noctuidae
- Genus: Diarsia
- Species: D. dislocata

Binomial name
- Diarsia dislocata (Smith, 1904)

Synonyms
- Noctua dislocata Smith, 1904

Species of moth

Diarsia dislocata, the dislocated dart, is a species of moth in the family Noctuidae. It is found across Canada (Ontario, Quebec, New Brunswick, Newfoundland and Labrador, British Columbia, Alberta, Saskatchewan, the Northwest Territories, Yukon and Manitoba) and in parts of the US (Alaska, Washington and Colorado).
