= Diarsia jucunda =

Smaller pinkish dart

Scientific classification
- Kingdom: Animalia
- Phylum: Arthropoda
- Class: Insecta
- Order: Lepidoptera
- Superfamily: Noctuoidea
- Family: Noctuidae
- Genus: Diarsia
- Species: D. jucunda

Binomial name
- Diarsia jucunda (Walker, [1857])

Synonyms
- Graphiphora jucunda Walker, 1857; Agrotis perconflua Grote, 1876; Agrotis eriensis Grote, 1878; Agrotis hospitalis Grote, 1882

Species of moth

Diarsia jucunda, the smaller pinkish dart, is a moth of the family Noctuidae. It is found from Newfoundland and central Ontario, west to northern Michigan and Wisconsin, south to Ohio. In the Appalachians it is found as far south as North Carolina. It has been recently recorded from Tennessee.

The wingspan is about 33 mm. Adults are on wing from June to August. There is one generation per year.

The larvae are probably general feeders and have been recorded from grasses and Taraxacum officinale.
