= Diarsia gaudens =

Scientific classification
- Kingdom: Animalia
- Phylum: Arthropoda
- Class: Insecta
- Order: Lepidoptera
- Superfamily: Noctuoidea
- Family: Noctuidae
- Genus: Diarsia
- Species: D. gaudens

Binomial name
- Diarsia gaudens (Hampson, 1905)

Synonyms
- Diarsia pygmaea Boursin

Species of moth

Diarsia gaudens is a moth of the family Noctuidae. It is endemic to Java.
