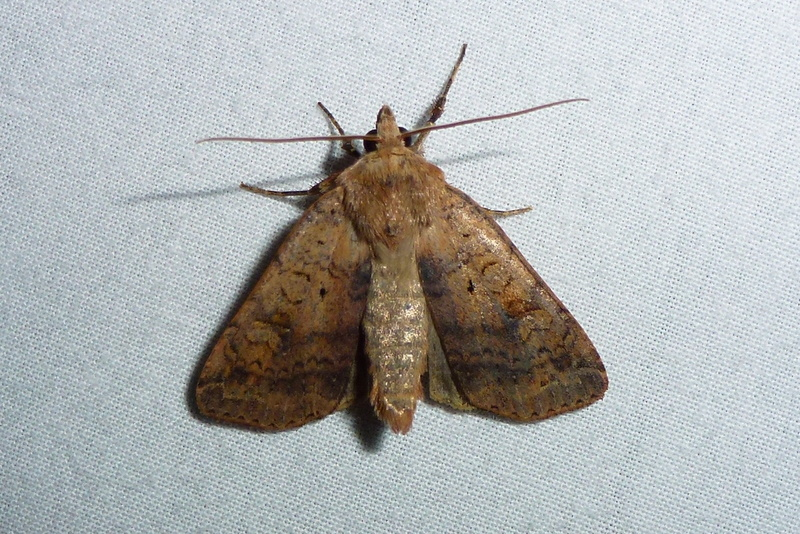

Scientific classification
- Domain: Eukaryota
- Kingdom: Animalia
- Phylum: Arthropoda
- Class: Insecta
- Order: Lepidoptera
- Superfamily: Noctuoidea
- Family: Noctuidae
- Genus: Diarsia
- Species: D. dahlii

Binomial name
- Diarsia dahlii (Hübner, 1813)

Synonyms
- Noctua dahlii Hübner, 1813

= Diarsia dahlii =

Species of moth

Diarsia dahlii, the barred chestnut, is a moth of the family Noctuidae. The species was first described by Jacob Hübner in 1813. It is found in Europe, through the Palearctic east to the Kamchatka Peninsula, northern China and Japan.

== Description ==
The wingspan is 28–40 mm. Forewing reddish brown with an ochreous tint in the male, darker, purplish brown in female; lines plain in the paler males; stigmata of the ground colour, the reniform with the lower lobe dark, the upper sometimes ochreous; claviform with a black dot at the tip; a distinct dark median shade; in the female the submarginal line is pale; hindwing dull fuscous, the fringe pinkish. It is a variable species occurring under different forms: ab. nana Stgr. from south-eastern Siberia is a dwarf form, not much more than half as large as the typical form.

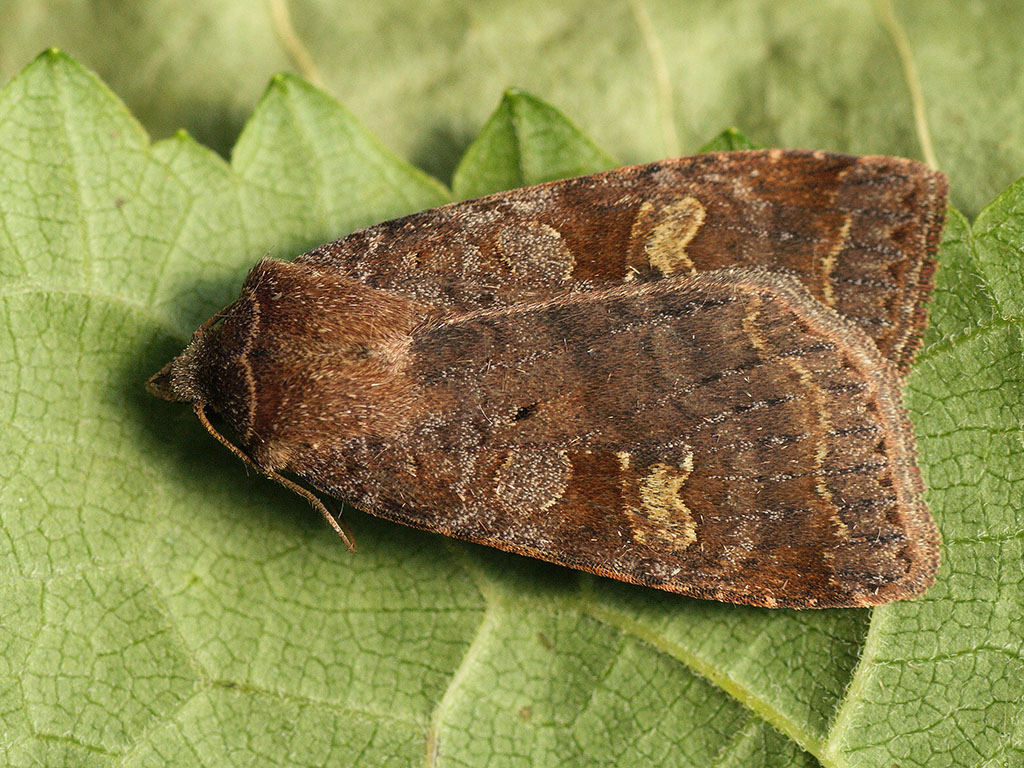

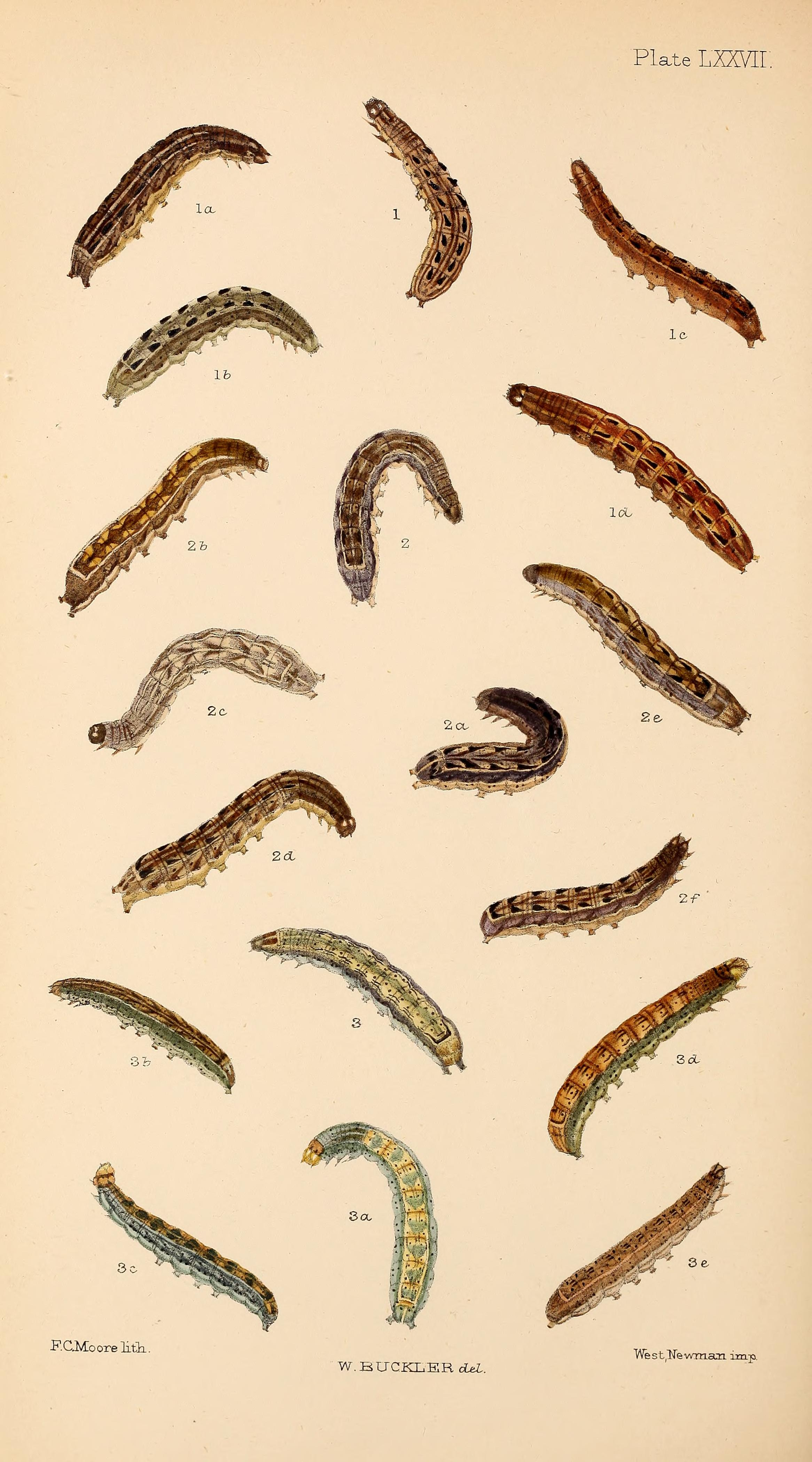
Figs 3, 3a, 3b, 3c, 3d, 3e larvae after final moult

== Biology ==
Adults are on wing from August to September depending on the location.

The larva varies in the colour of the back through various shades of ochreous and brown to dark reddish brown, and this is always in strong contrast with the colour of the lower parts; the lines are pale, and the outer ones on the back are edged with black dashes; spots and spiracles black; head pale brown. The larvae feed on Betula, Vaccinium myrtillus, Rumex and Plantago.

== Subspecies ==
- Diarsia dahlii dahlii (central and northern Europe, Caucasus, Transcaucasia, Kazakhstan)
- Diarsia dahlii nana (central Siberia to eastern Siberia, northern China, Mongolia)
- Diarsia dahlii tibetica (southern China, Tibet)
