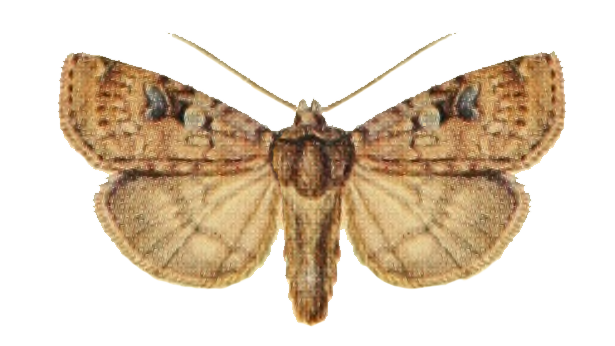
- Illustration by George Hampson, 1903

Scientific classification
- Kingdom: Animalia
- Phylum: Arthropoda
- Class: Insecta
- Order: Lepidoptera
- Superfamily: Noctuoidea
- Family: Noctuidae
- Genus: Diarsia
- Species: D. calgary

Binomial name
- Diarsia calgary Smith, 1898

Synonyms
- Noctua calgary Smith, 1898

= Diarsia calgary =

Calgary dart

Species of moth

Diarsia calgary, the Calgary dart, is a moth of the family Noctuidae. The species was first described by Smith in 1898. It is found in North America in the mountains and foothills from Yukon, south to Arizona and New Mexico, west to the coast of British Columbia. There is a disjunct population in central western California.

The wingspan is about 30 mm.
