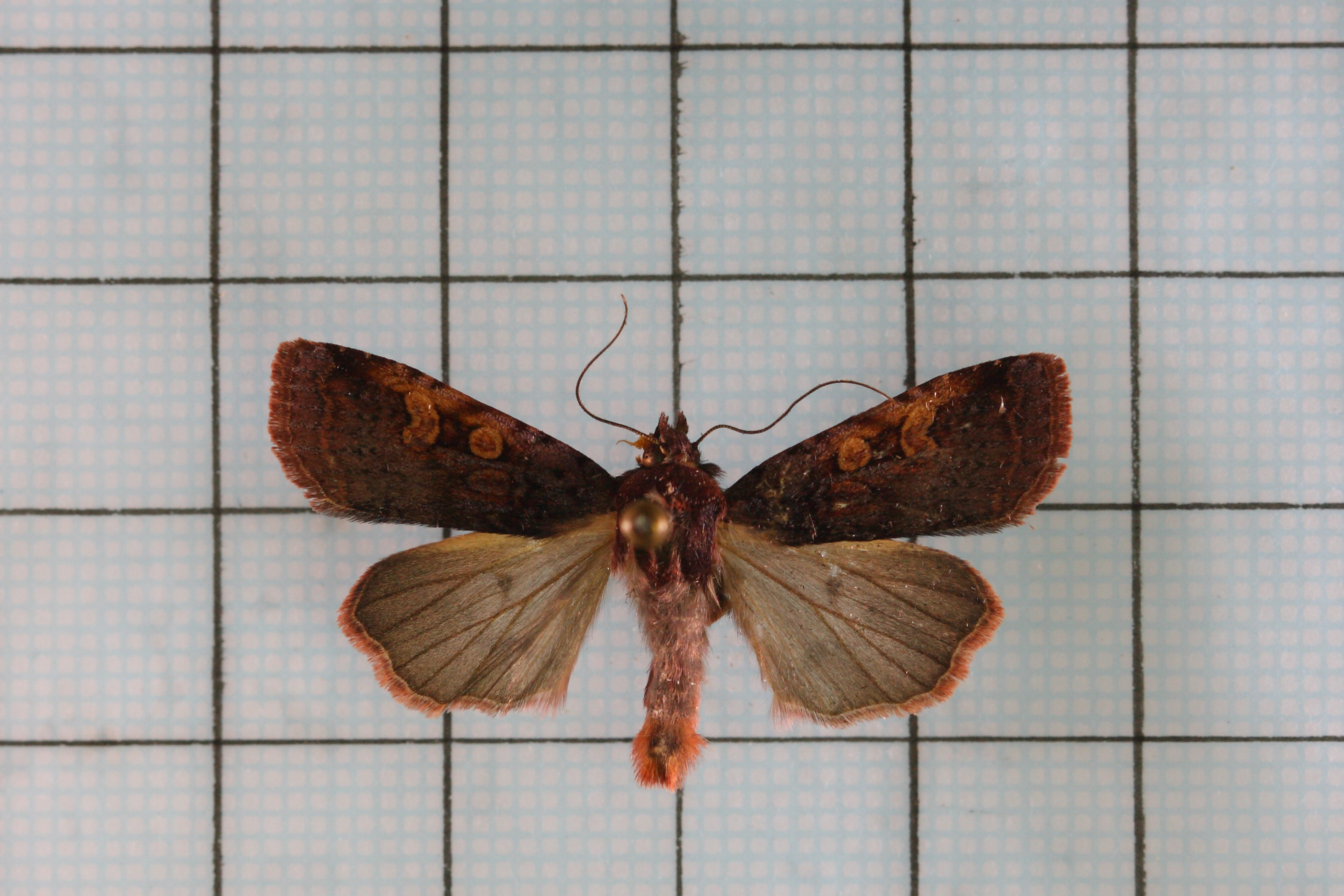

Scientific classification
- Domain: Eukaryota
- Kingdom: Animalia
- Phylum: Arthropoda
- Class: Insecta
- Order: Lepidoptera
- Superfamily: Noctuoidea
- Family: Noctuidae
- Genus: Diarsia
- Species: D. cia

Binomial name
- Diarsia cia (Strand, 1919)

Synonyms
- Rhyacia cia Strand, 1919

= Diarsia cia =

Species of moth

Diarsia cia is a moth of the family Noctuidae. It is found in Taiwan.

The wingspan is 36–39 mm.
