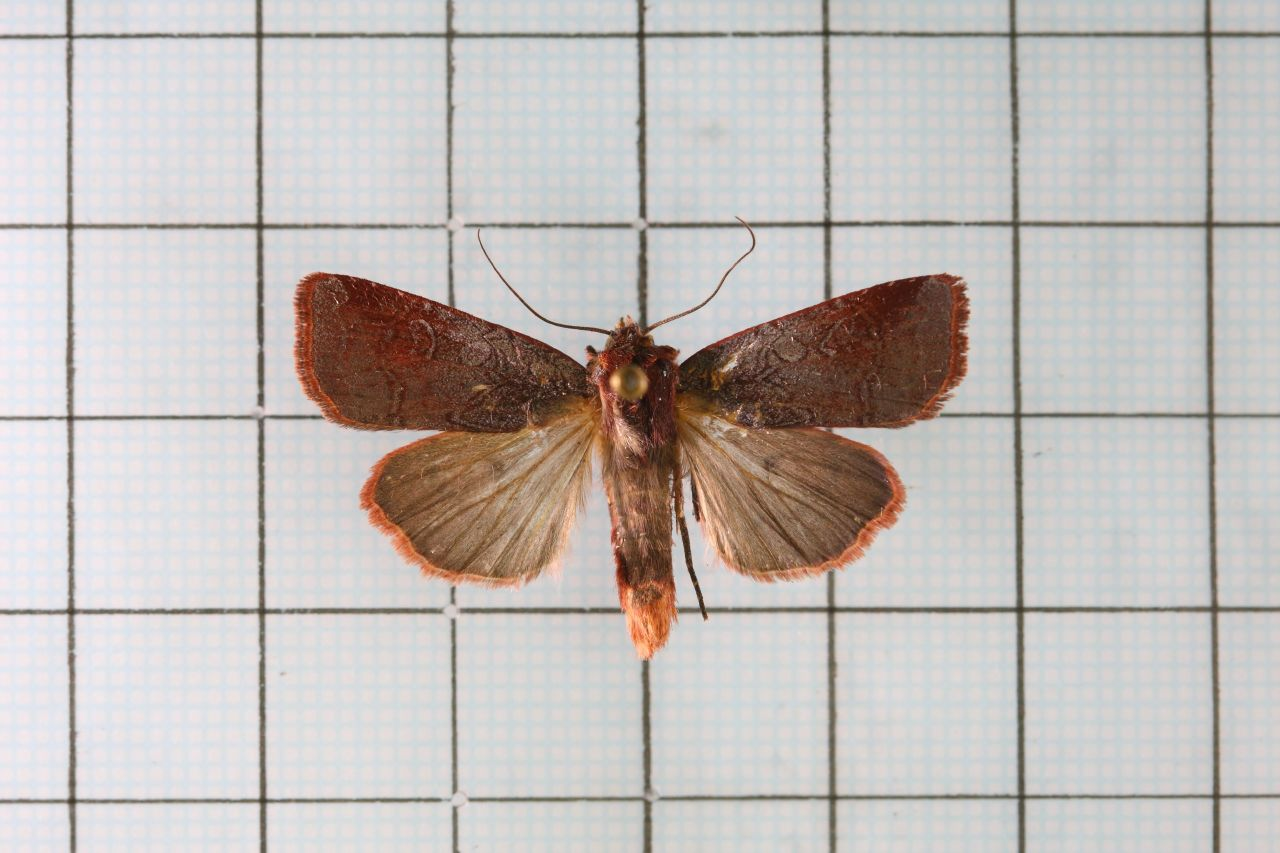

Scientific classification
- Domain: Eukaryota
- Kingdom: Animalia
- Phylum: Arthropoda
- Class: Insecta
- Order: Lepidoptera
- Superfamily: Noctuoidea
- Family: Noctuidae
- Genus: Diarsia
- Species: D. subtincta

Binomial name
- Diarsia subtincta Chang, 1991

= Diarsia subtincta =

Species of moth

Diarsia subtincta is a moth of the family Noctuidae. It is found in Taiwan.
