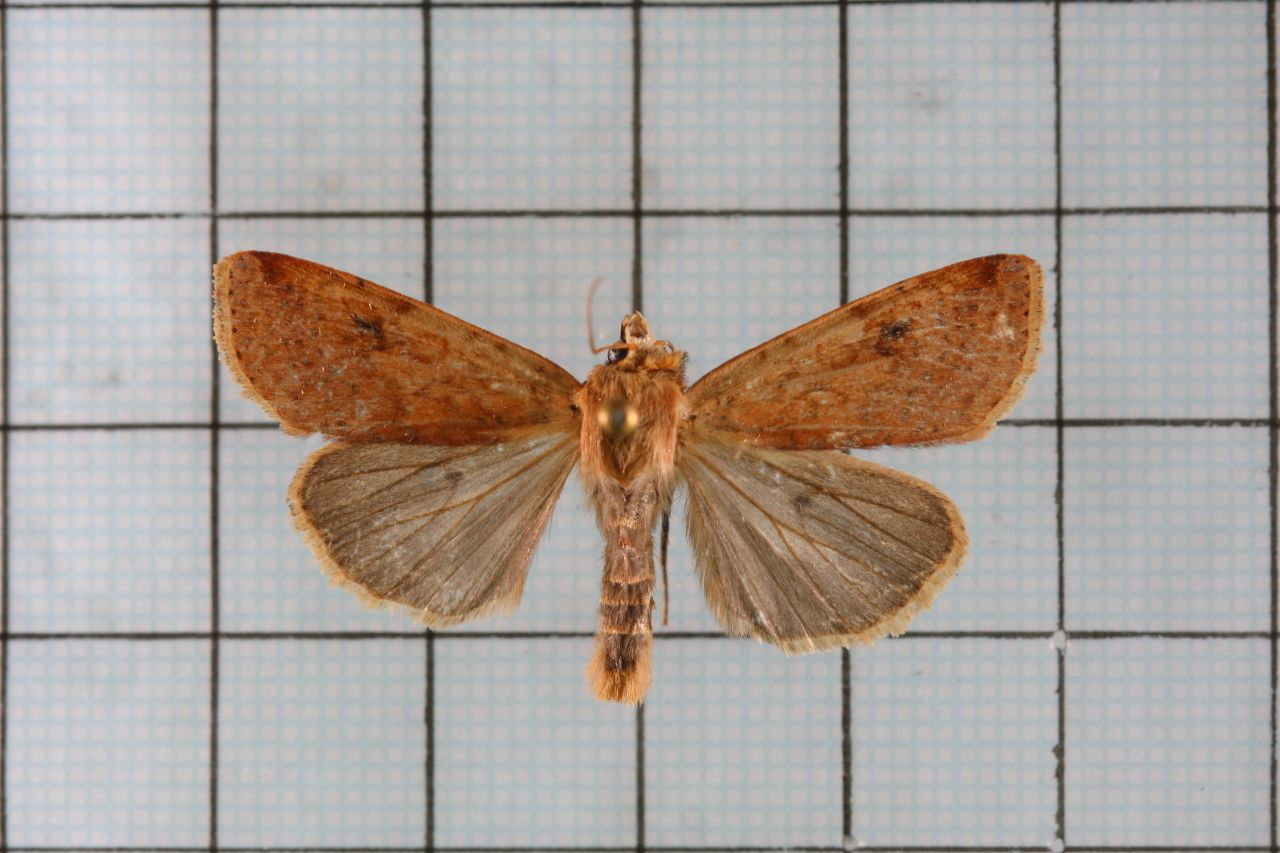

Scientific classification
- Kingdom: Animalia
- Phylum: Arthropoda
- Class: Insecta
- Order: Lepidoptera
- Superfamily: Noctuoidea
- Family: Noctuidae
- Genus: Diarsia
- Species: D. arenosoides

Binomial name
- Diarsia arenosoides Poole, 1989

Synonyms
- Agrotis arenosa Wileman, 1912; Oxira arenosoides

= Diarsia arenosoides =

Species of moth

Diarsia arenosoides is a moth of the family Noctuidae. It is found in Taiwan.
