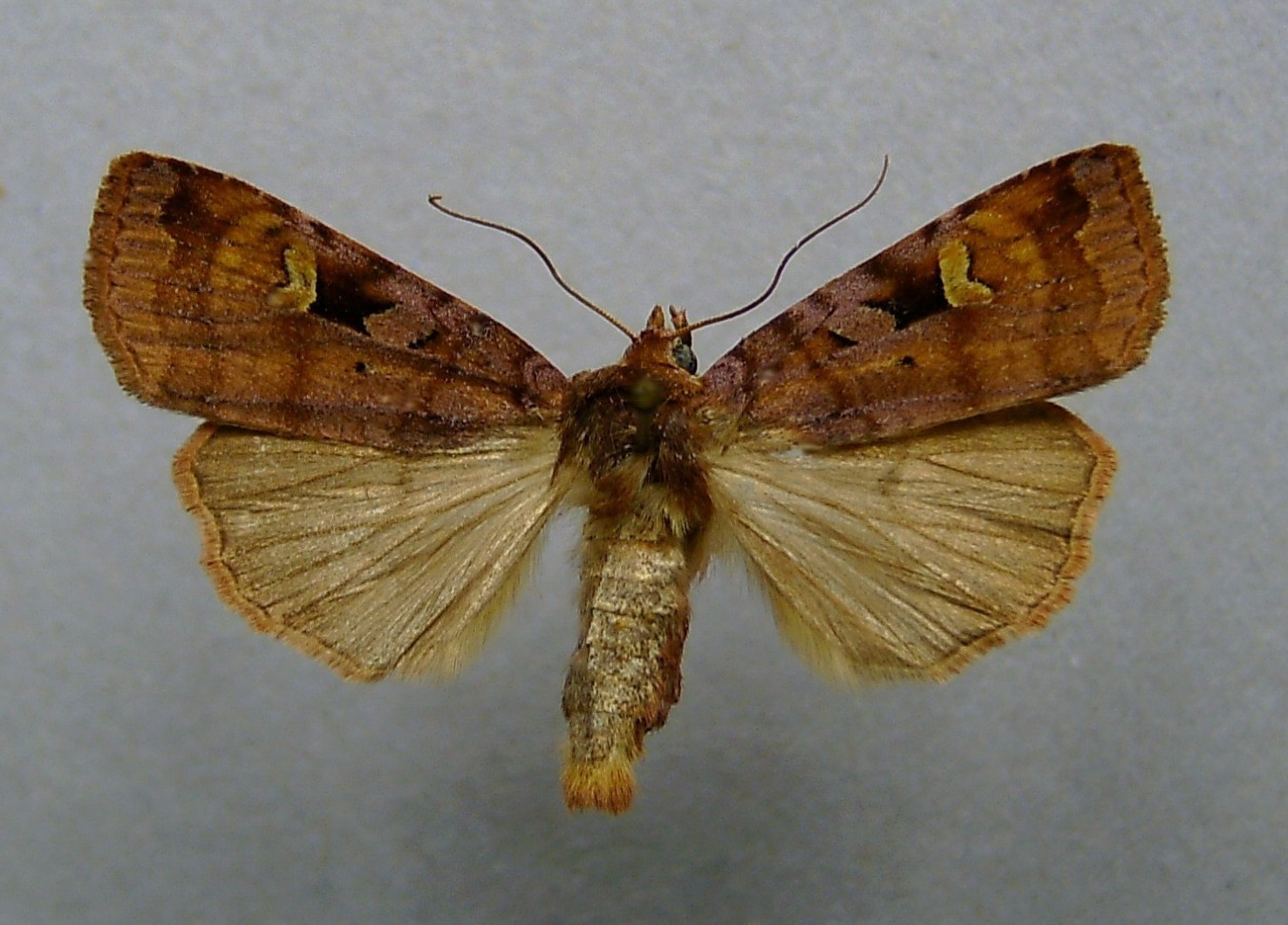

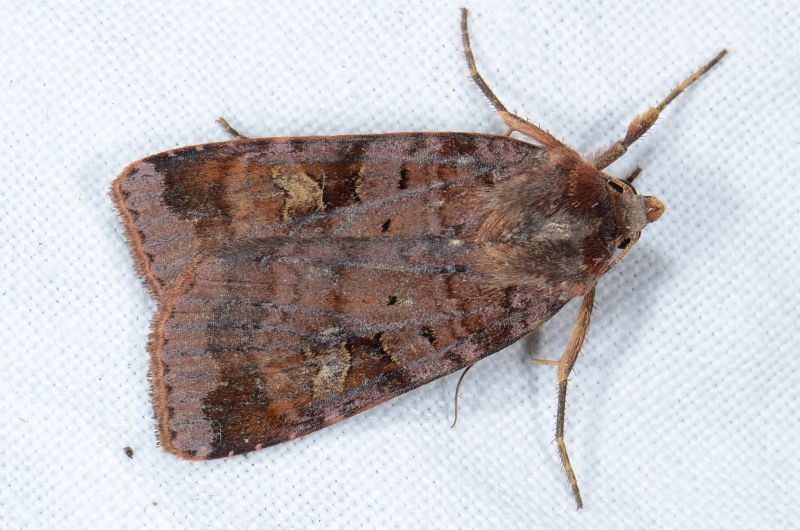

Scientific classification
- Kingdom: Animalia
- Phylum: Arthropoda
- Class: Insecta
- Order: Lepidoptera
- Superfamily: Noctuoidea
- Family: Noctuidae
- Genus: Diarsia
- Species: D. brunnea

Binomial name
- Diarsia brunnea (Denis & Schiffermüller, 1775)

Synonyms
- Noctua brunnea [Schiffermüller], 1775; Phalaena (Noctua) lucifera Esper, 1789; Phalaena (Noctua) lucifera Esper, 1798; Phalaena (Noctua) arvensis Gmelin, [1790]; Noctua carnea Thunberg, 1792; Phalaena (Noctua) fragariae Borkhausen, 1792

= Diarsia brunnea =

Purple clay

Species of moth

Diarsia brunnea, the purple clay, is a moth of the family Noctuidae. The species was first described by Michael Denis and Ignaz Schiffermüller in 1775. It is found in most of Europe, east to Transcaucasia, the Caucasus, central Asia, Siberia, the Kuriles, Amur, Ussuri, Sakhalin, Korea, Japan, and China, including China's Tibet region.

== Description ==
The wingspan is 35–38 mm. Forewing pinkish or purplish-plum coloured; the costal half with a fulvous and yellow tinge; cell deep olive brown; claviform marked by a dark spot at its end; orbicular oblong, of the ground colour; reniform outlined or filled with ochreous; hindwing luteous (muddy yellow) fuscous; cilia pink.

Adults are on wing from July to August.

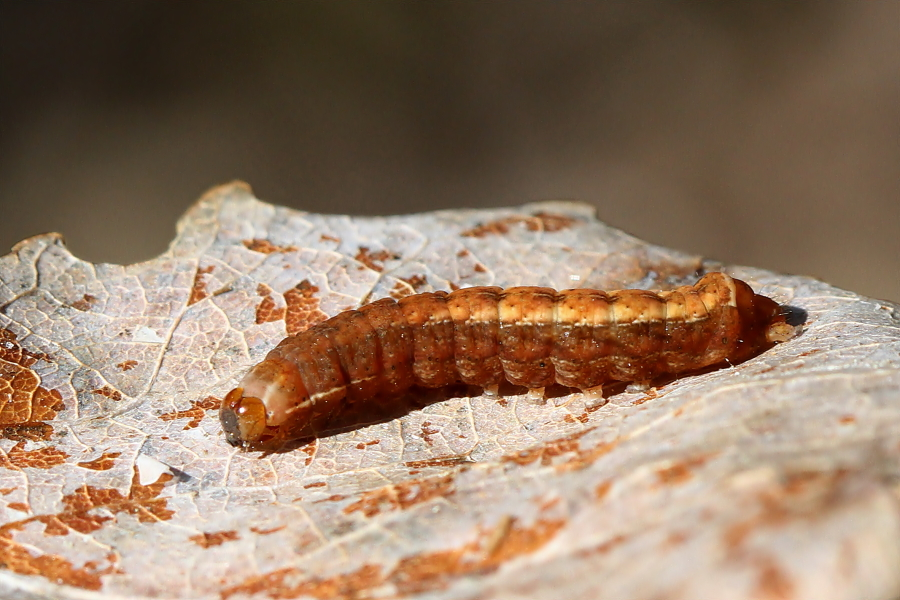
Larva

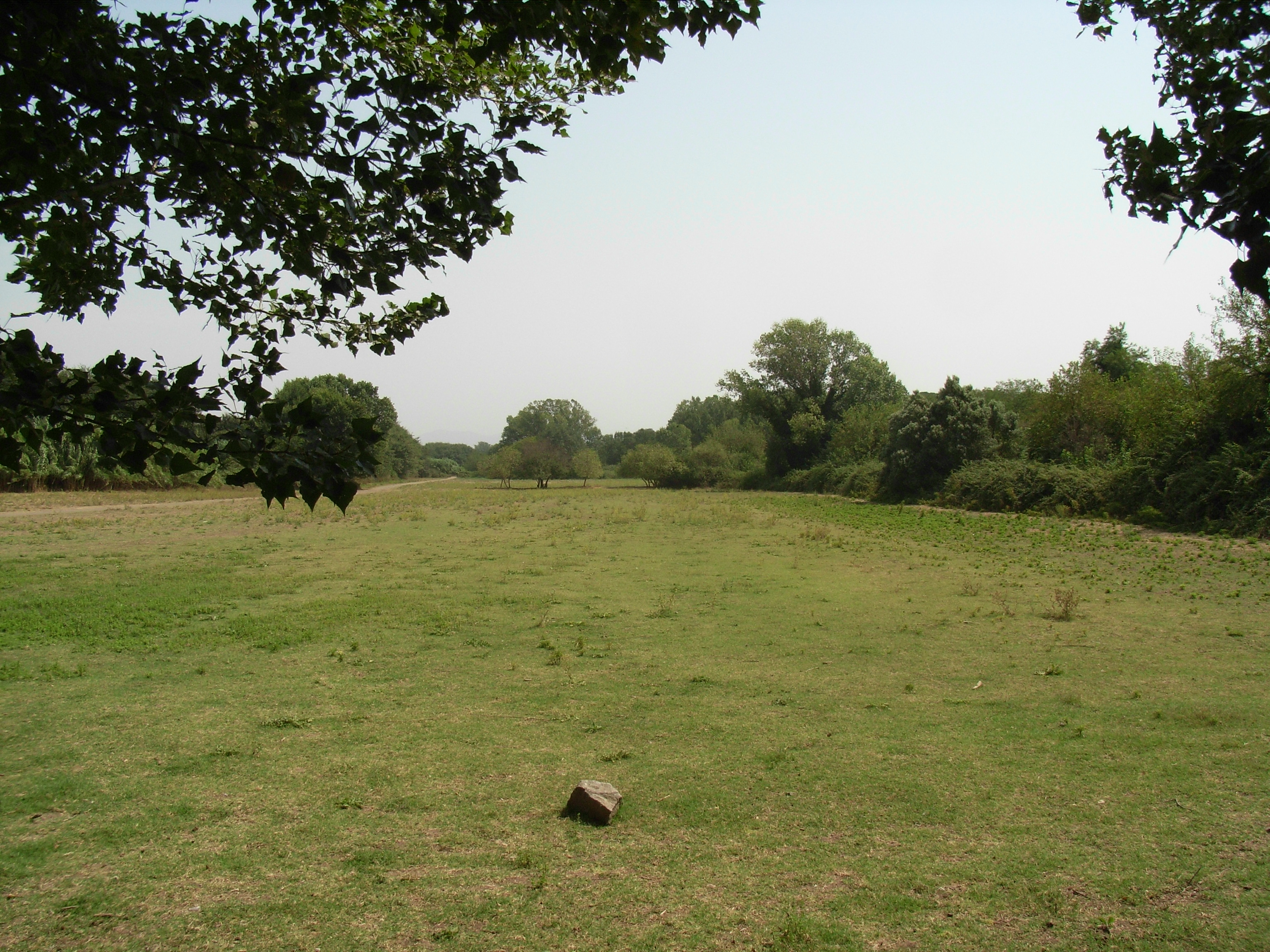
Habitat in Italy

Larva dark brown; dorsal and subdorsal lines pale, lateral lines whitish; a row of pale yellow dark-edged oblique stripes, and a yellow stripe across segment 11. The larvae feed on a wide range of herbaceous plants and shrubs, including Rumex species (including Rumex acetosella), Dryopteris filix-mas, Luzula sylvatica, Deschampsia flexuosa, Brachypodium sylvaticum, Vaccinium myrtillus, Vaccinium uliginosum, Prunus spinosa, Primula, Rubus, Urtica, Salix and Betula.

== Subspecies ==
- Diarsia brunnea brunnea (Europe, Transcaucasia, Caucasus, central Asia, Siberia)
- Diarsia brunnea urupina (Kuriles, Amur, Ussuri, Sakhalin, Korea, Japan, Tibet, China)
