= Karl Friedrich Vieweg =

Karl Friedrich Vieweg (also Carl; German: [ˈfiːveːk]; fl. 1790) was a German entomologist who specialised in Lepidoptera

In 1790 Vieweg, a Prussian, published Tabellarisches Verzeichniss der in der Churmark Brandenburg einheimischen Schmetterlinge. Zweytes Heft. Mit drey illuminirten Kupfertafeln. 1–98, 3 plates (Vieweg, Berlin). Vieweg is an author of names published under the International Code of Zoological Nomenclature.
