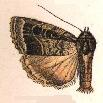

Scientific classification
- Domain: Eukaryota
- Kingdom: Animalia
- Phylum: Arthropoda
- Class: Insecta
- Order: Lepidoptera
- Superfamily: Noctuoidea
- Family: Noctuidae
- Genus: Amphipyra
- Species: A. sergei

Binomial name
- Amphipyra sergei (Staudinger, 1888)

Synonyms
- Acosmetia alpherakii var. sergei Staudinger, 1888; Amphipyra sergii Hampson, 1908

= Amphipyra sergei =

Species of moth

Amphipyra sergei is a moth in the family Noctuidae. It is found in Russia, Kazakhstan and China.
