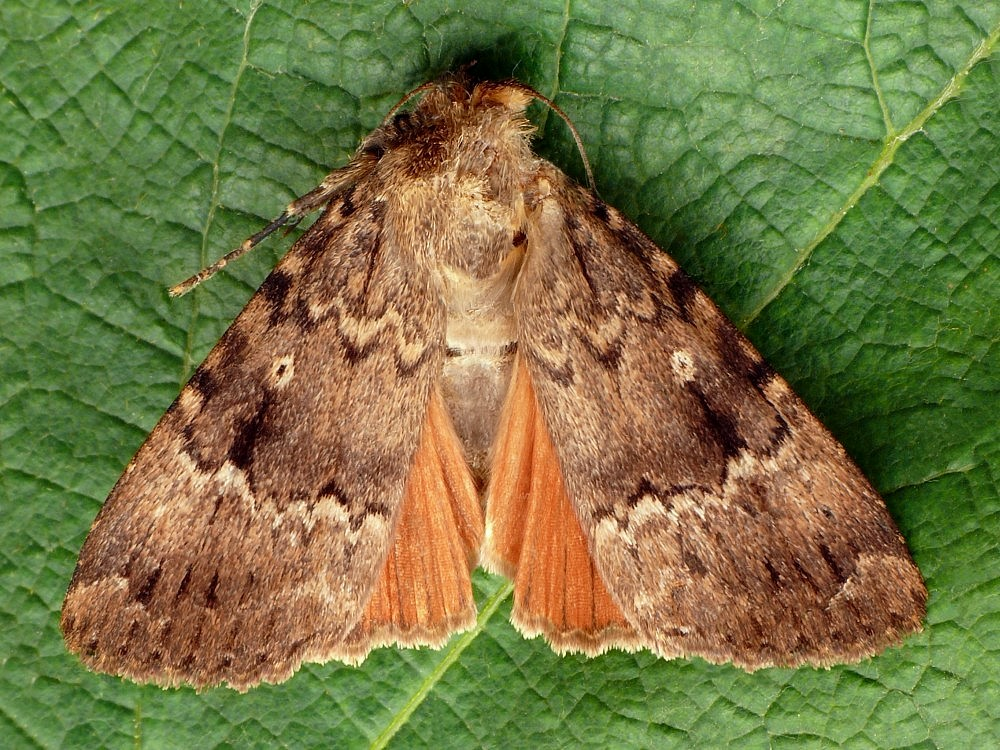

Scientific classification
- Kingdom: Animalia
- Phylum: Arthropoda
- Clade: Pancrustacea
- Class: Insecta
- Order: Lepidoptera
- Superfamily: Noctuoidea
- Family: Noctuidae
- Genus: Amphipyra
- Species: A. pyramidea

Binomial name
- Amphipyra pyramidea (Linnaeus, 1758)

= Copper underwing =

Amphipyra pyramidea

Species of moth

The copper underwing, humped green fruitworm or pyramidal green fruitworm (Amphipyra pyramidea) is a moth of the family Noctuidae. The species was first described by Carl Linnaeus in his 1758 10th edition of Systema Naturae.

== Distribution ==
This species can be found across the Palaearctic region including Europe, North Africa, the Near East, Iran, southern Siberia, northern India, Korea and Japan. It is rather common over the southern half of Britain.

== Description ==
This species has a wingspan of 47–54 mm, the female usually slightly larger than the male. The forewings are brown marked with paler fascia and a pale, dark-centred stigma. The hindwings are a rich bright copper colour (hence the common name of "copper underwing").

It is very similar to Svensson's copper underwing (Amphipyra berbera) but identification is usually fairly straightforward by looking at some markings on the forewings, the detail of the labial palps and at the underside of the hindwings. This species has a pale area in the centre of the hindwings, contrasting with much darker marginal areas, while in A. berbera the whole underwing is more or less uniform in colour. See Townsend et al. The larva is green with white markings and a pointed hump at the rear end.

== Differentiation of A. pyramidea from A. berbera ==
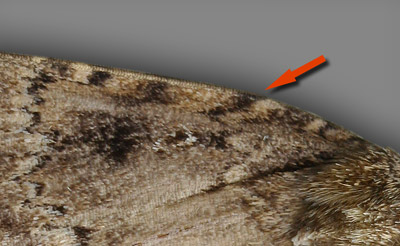
A. pyramidea - red arrow points out a difference

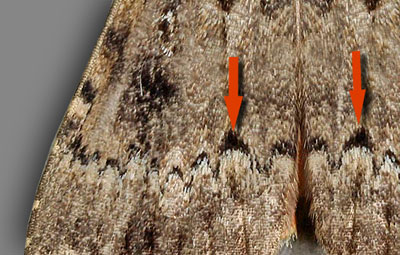
A. berbera - red arrows point out a difference

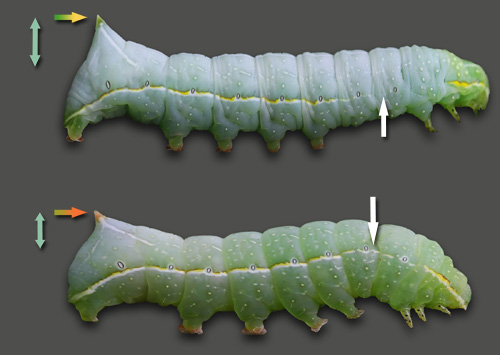
Caterpillars of A. pyramidea (top) and A. berbera

== Biology ==
It is a univoltine species. Hatching season is as early as June in some climates but they usually hatch July to October. Eggs are laid in deciduous trees. Larva can be found as early as April in some climates but usually emerge in May–June. A pyramidea flies at night from August to October and is attracted to light and strongly to sugar. It feeds on a variety of trees and shrubs, including ash tree (Fraxinus), privet (Ligustrum), honeysuckle (Lonicera), apple (Malus), oak (Quercus), Rhododendron, rose, wild service tree (Sorbus) and lilac (Syringa). The species overwinters as an egg.

1. The flight season refers to the British Isles. This may vary in other parts of the range.

== Gallery ==
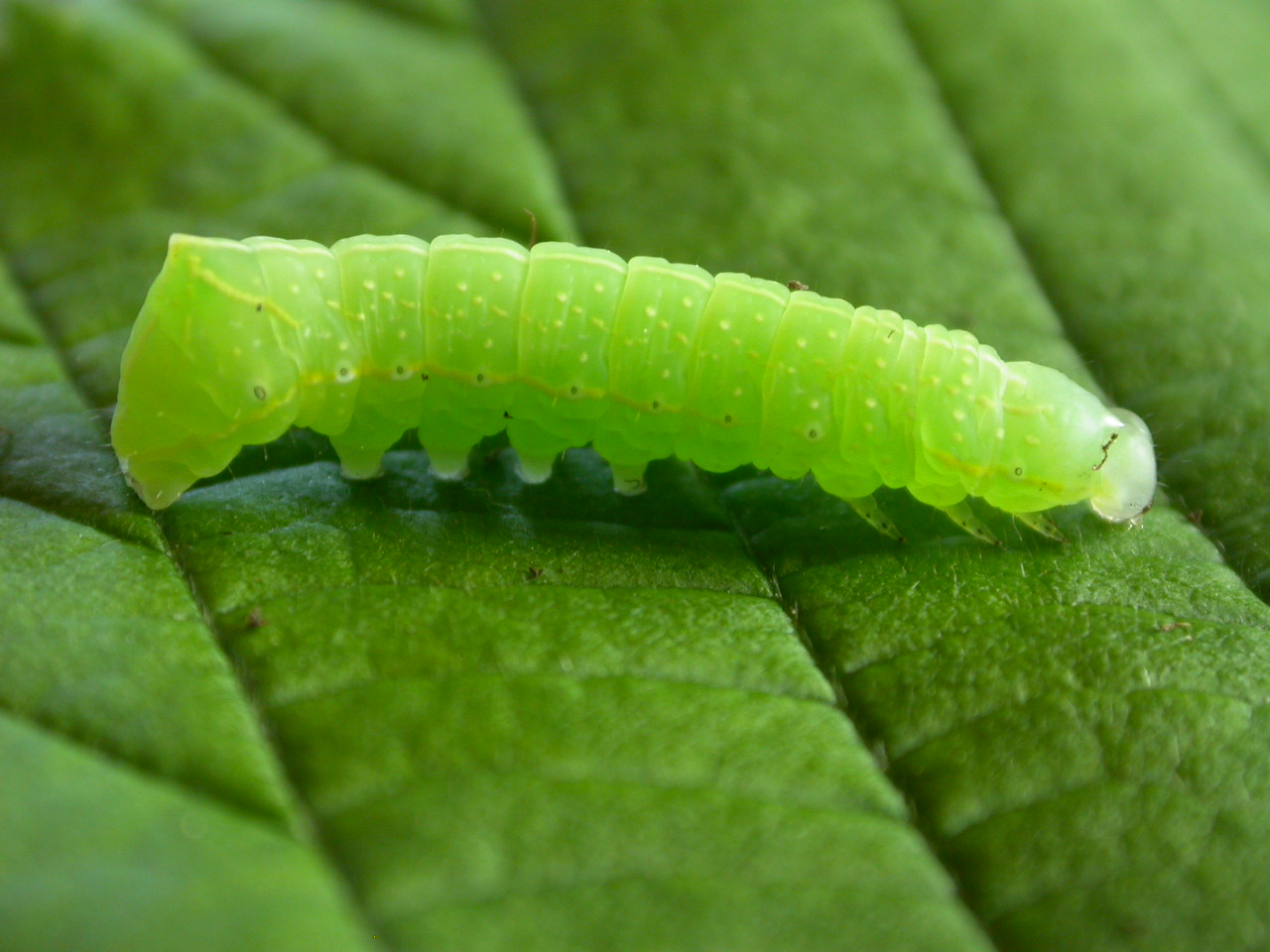
Larva

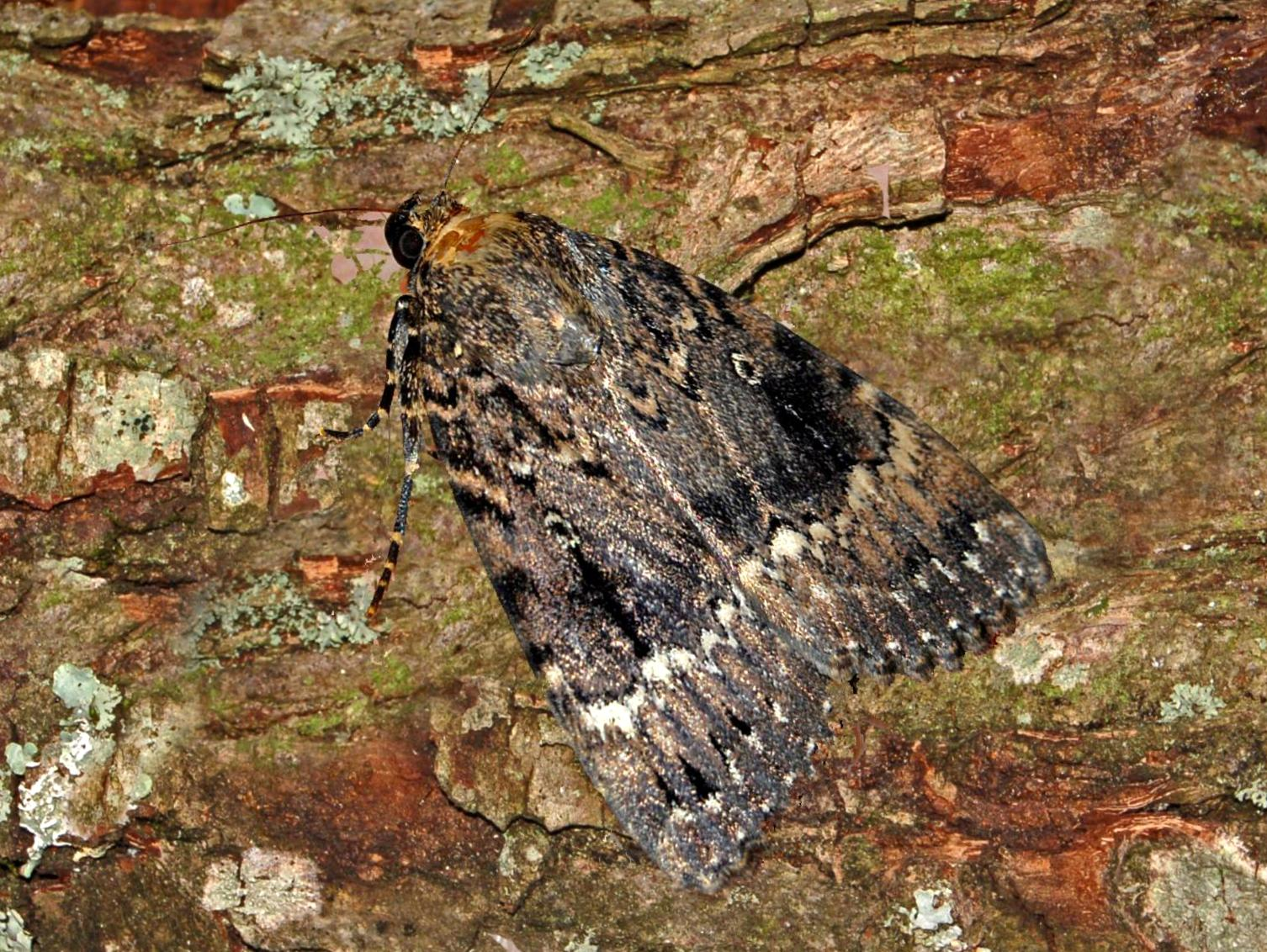
Moth

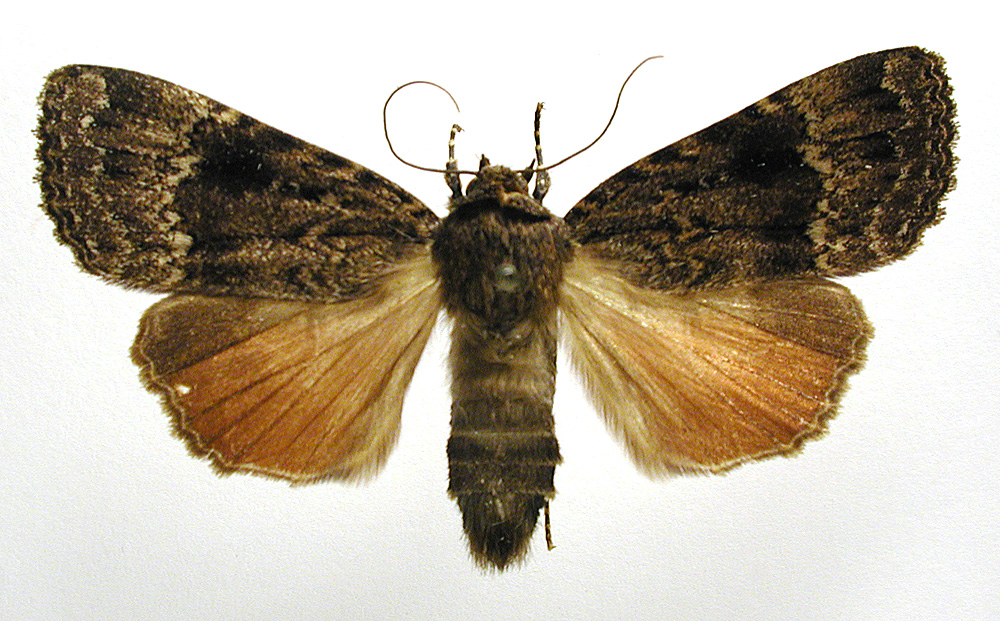
Mounted specimen

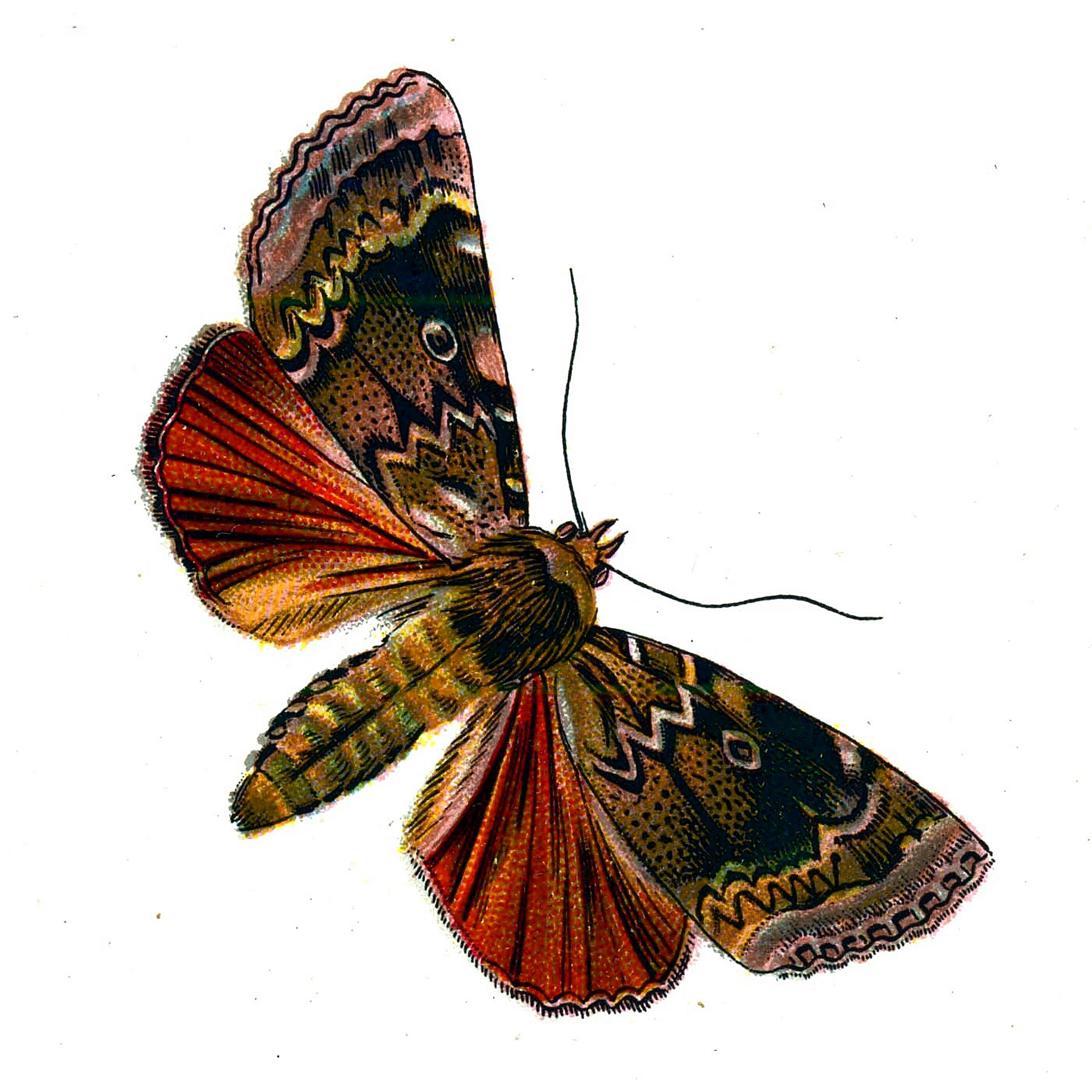
Illustration

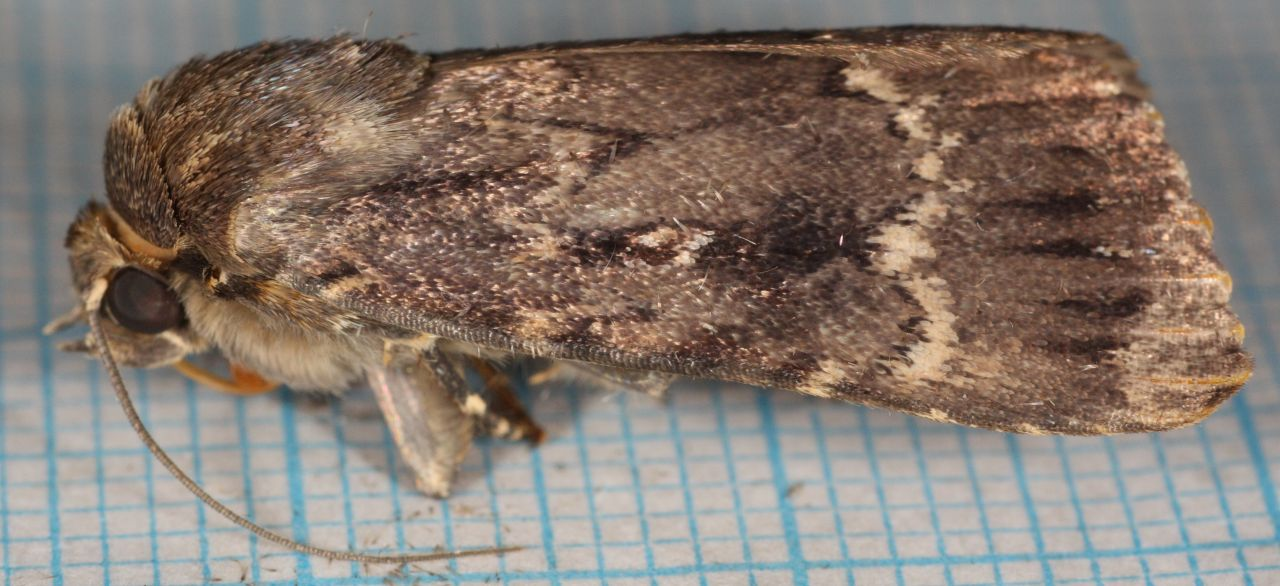
