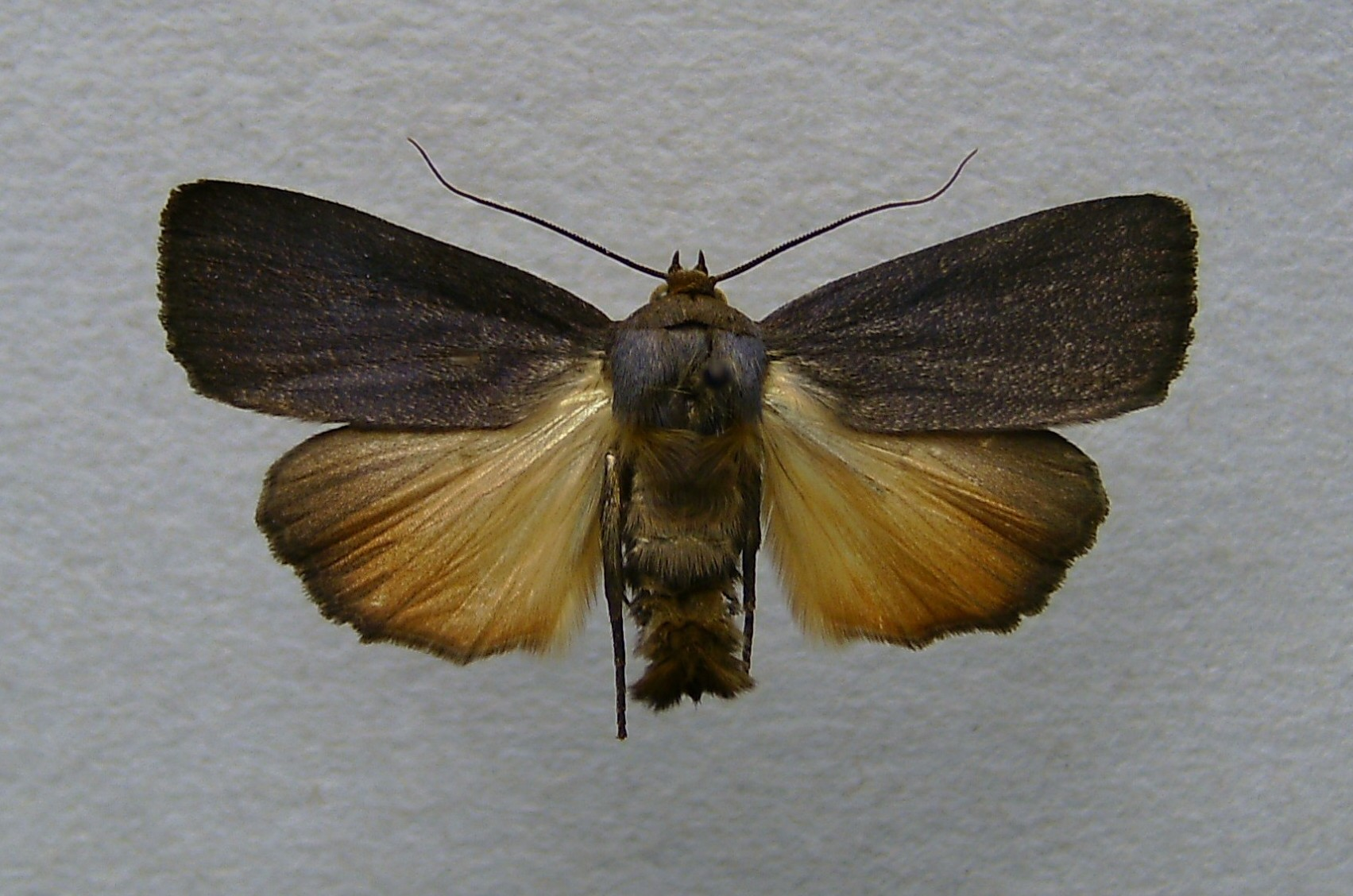

Scientific classification
- Domain: Eukaryota
- Kingdom: Animalia
- Phylum: Arthropoda
- Class: Insecta
- Order: Lepidoptera
- Superfamily: Noctuoidea
- Family: Noctuidae
- Genus: Amphipyra
- Species: A. livida

Binomial name
- Amphipyra livida (Denis & Schiffermüller, 1775)

Synonyms
- Noctua livida Denis & Schiffermuller, 1775

= Amphipyra livida =

Species of moth

Amphipyra livida is a moth in the family Noctuidae. It is found in central and southern Europe, although strays are known from further north. It is also known from Anatolia to Korea, China and Japan.

The wingspan is 39–45 mm. Adults are mainly on wing from August to October.

The larvae feed on various low-growing plants, such as Taraxacum and Hieracium species. Larvae can be found from April to July. The species overwinters as an egg.

== Subspecies ==
- Amphipyra livida livida
- Amphipyra livida corvina (Japan)
