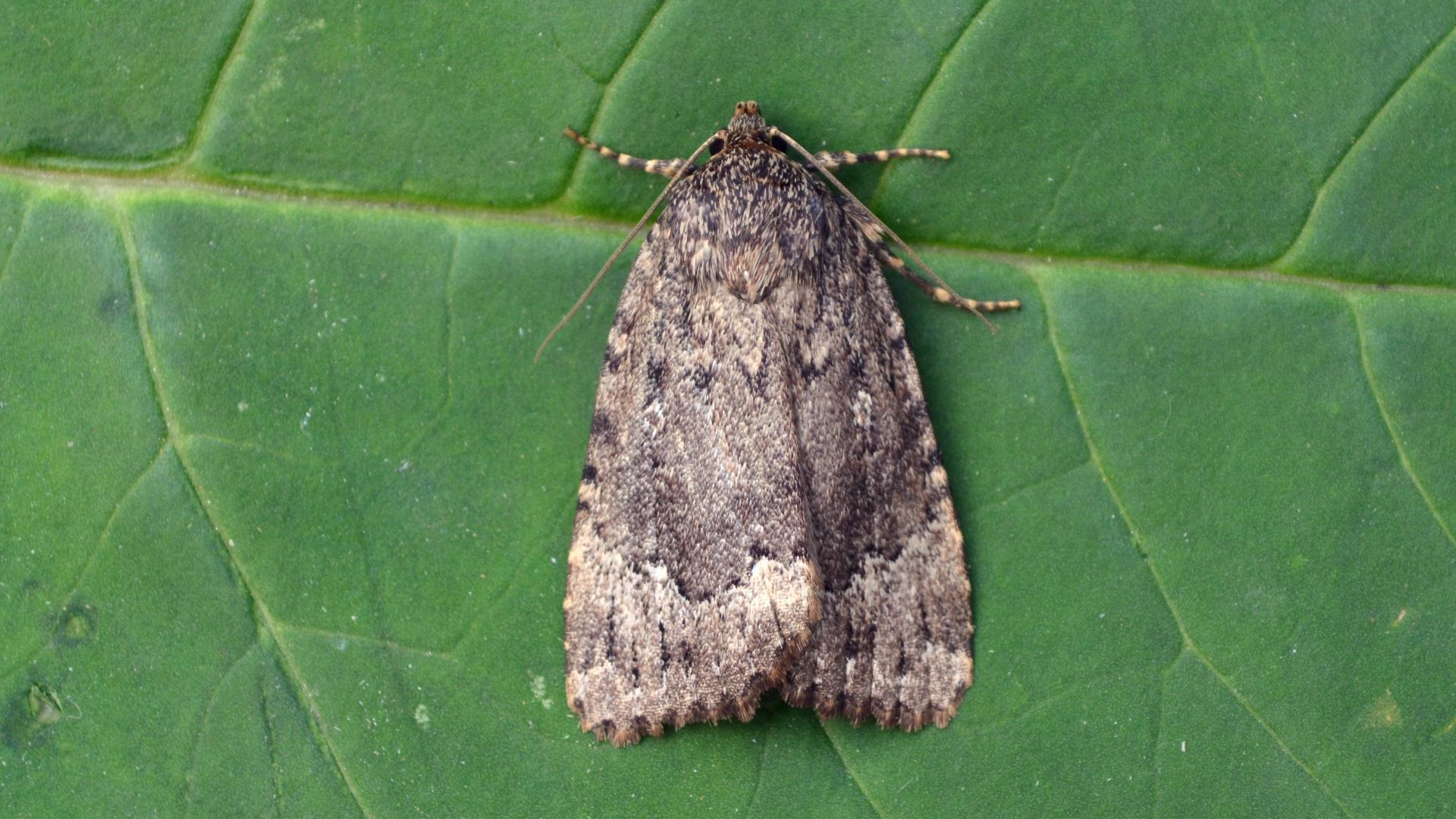

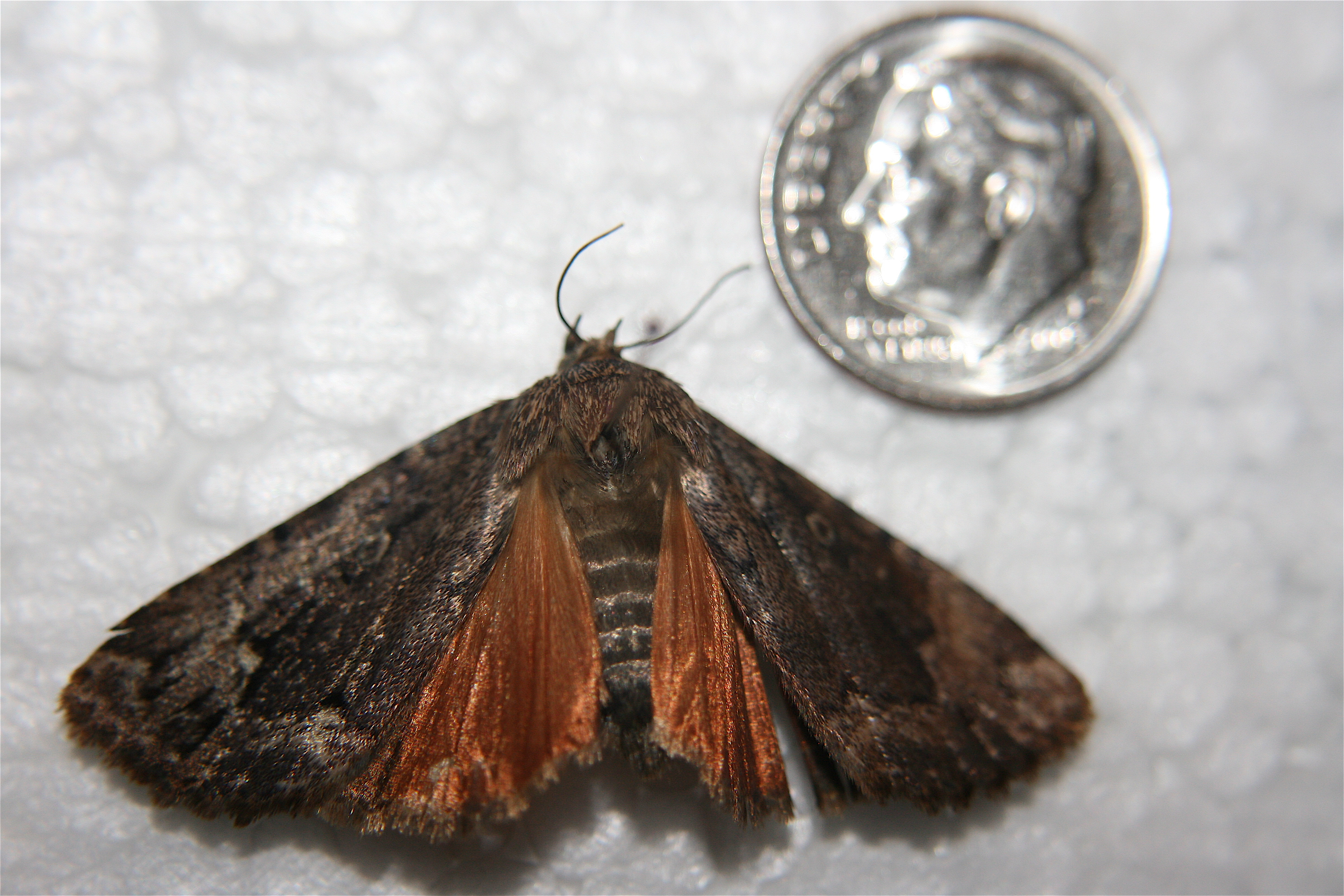

Scientific classification
- Kingdom: Animalia
- Phylum: Arthropoda
- Clade: Pancrustacea
- Class: Insecta
- Order: Lepidoptera
- Superfamily: Noctuoidea
- Family: Noctuidae
- Genus: Amphipyra
- Species: A. pyramidoides

Binomial name
- Amphipyra pyramidoides Guenée, 1852

Synonyms
- Amphipyra carbonita Franclemont, 1941; Amphipyra conspersa Riley, 1871; Amphipyra inornata Grote, 1864

= Amphipyra pyramidoides =

Copper Underwing

Species of moth

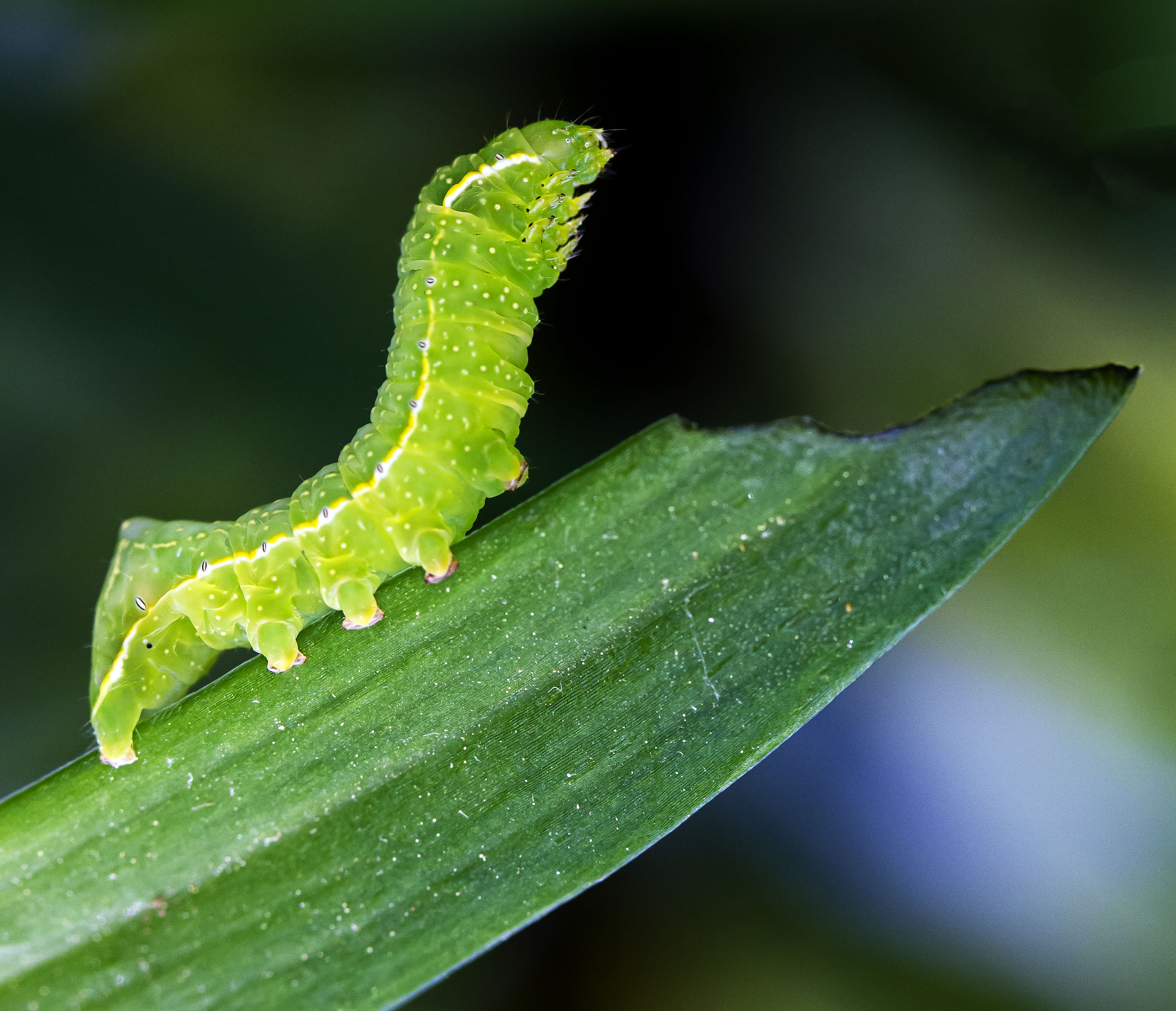
Amphipyra pyramidoides

Amphipyra pyramidoides, the copper underwing, is a species of moth in the family Noctuidae. It is found in the US and southern Canada.

The wingspan is 38–52 mm. Adults are on wing from July through October depending on the location. There is one generation per year. They overwinter as eggs. The caterpillars are green with a white middorsal spiracular line, yellow spotting, and a hump at their eighth abdominal segment. Adult copper underwings have dappled brown forewings, and white hindwings with a black cross line and coppery orange suffusion.

The larvae feed on the leaves of many broadleaf trees and shrubs, including apple, basswood, hawthorn, maple, oak, walnut, raspberry, grape, greenbrier (Smilax). The larvae are active in the spring; when ready to pupate they build a shelter by rolling a leaf. Aggregations of newly eclosed adults are found under bark, etc., in mid-summer.

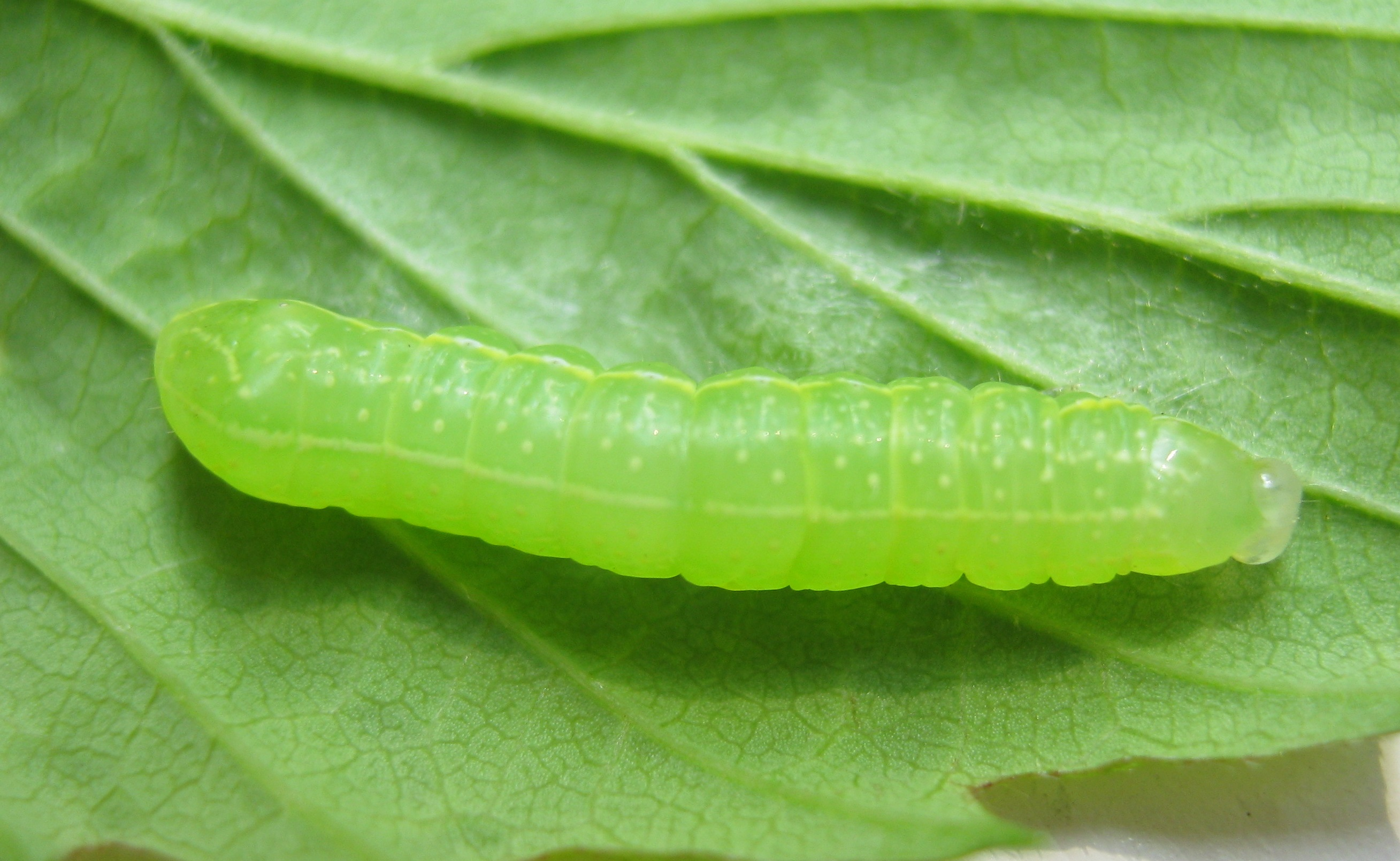
Larva, early instar

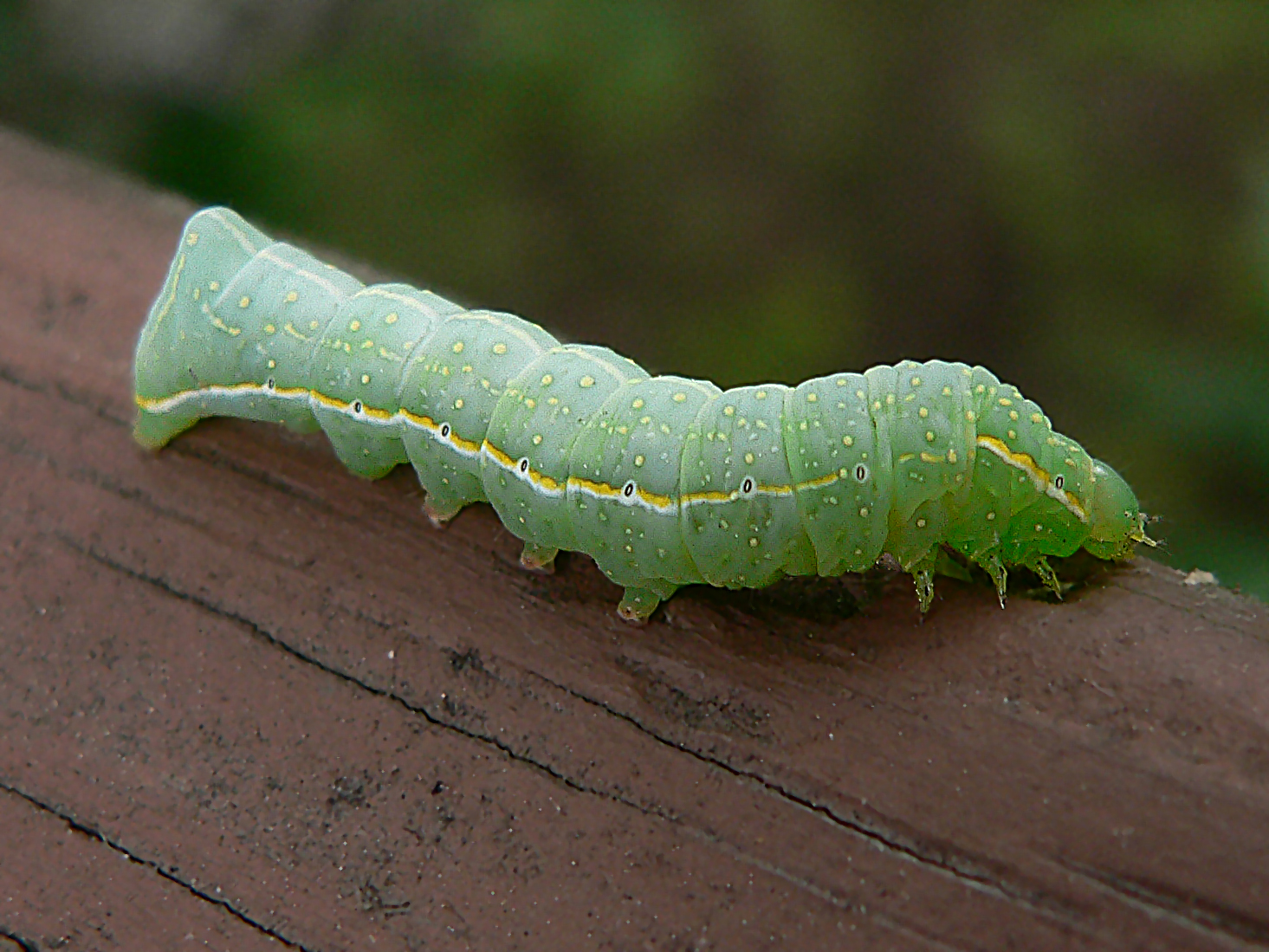
Larva, later instar

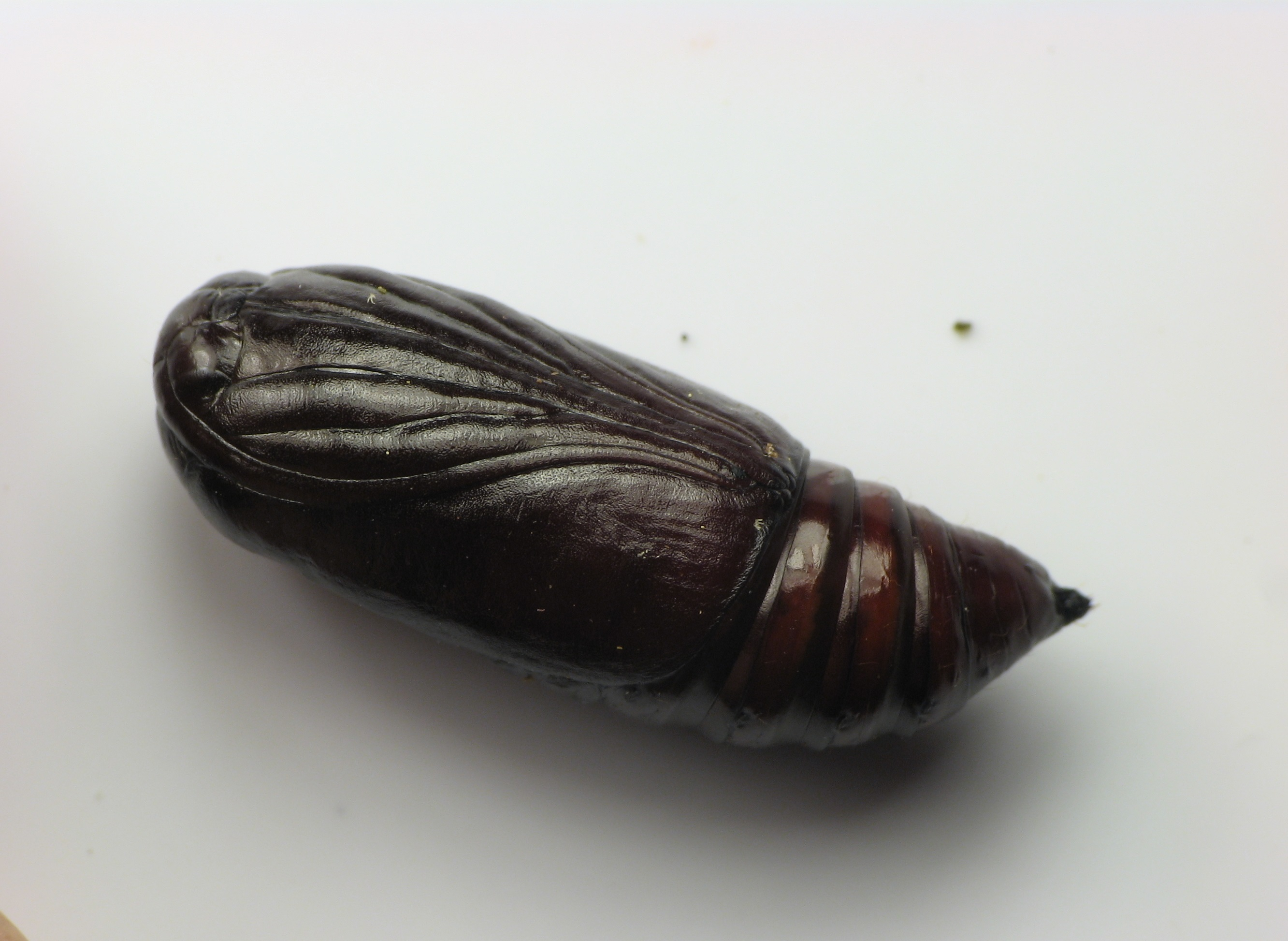
Pupa
