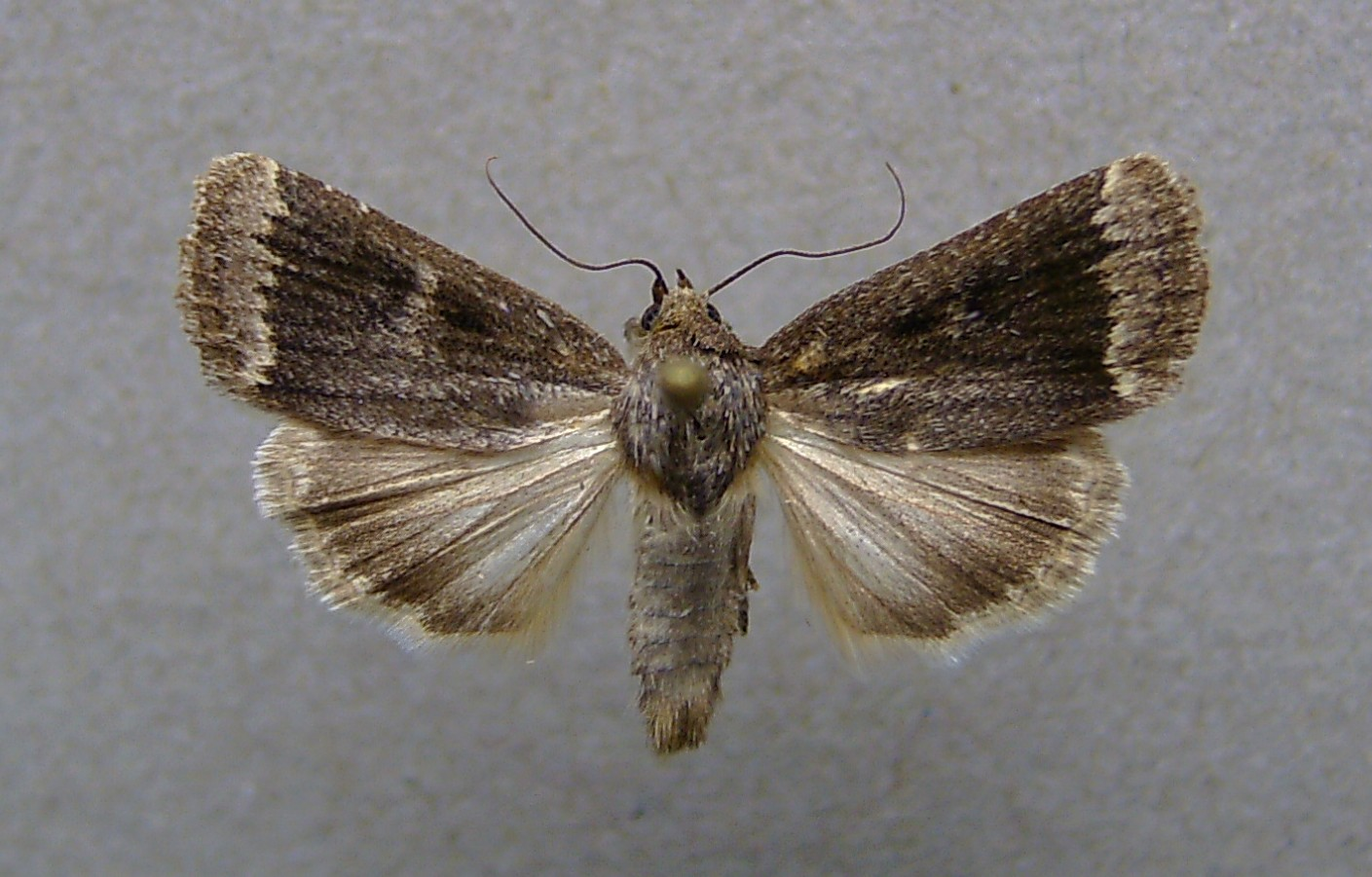

Scientific classification
- Domain: Eukaryota
- Kingdom: Animalia
- Phylum: Arthropoda
- Class: Insecta
- Order: Lepidoptera
- Superfamily: Noctuoidea
- Family: Noctuidae
- Genus: Amphipyra
- Species: A. stix

Binomial name
- Amphipyra stix Herrich-Schäffer, 1850

= Amphipyra stix =

Species of moth

Amphipyra stix is a moth in the family Noctuidae. It is found on the Balkan Peninsula and in Turkey, Iran, Lebanon, Armenia and Israel.

The wingspan is 29–35 mm. There is one generation per year with adults on wing from June to August.
