= Amphipyra brunneoatra =

Scientific classification
- Kingdom: Animalia
- Phylum: Arthropoda
- Class: Insecta
- Order: Lepidoptera
- Superfamily: Noctuoidea
- Family: Noctuidae
- Genus: Amphipyra
- Species: A. brunneoatra

Binomial name
- Amphipyra brunneoatra Strand, 1916

Species of moth

Amphipyra brunneoatra is a species of moth in the family Noctuidae (the owlet moths). It is found in North America.

The MONA or Hodges number for Amphipyra brunneoatra is 9641.
