= Amphipyra glabella =

Scientific classification
- Domain: Eukaryota
- Kingdom: Animalia
- Phylum: Arthropoda
- Class: Insecta
- Order: Lepidoptera
- Superfamily: Noctuoidea
- Family: Noctuidae
- Genus: Amphipyra
- Species: A. glabella

Binomial name
- Amphipyra glabella Morrison, 1874

Species of moth

Amphipyra glabella, the grey amphipyra or smooth amphipyra, is a moth in the family Noctuidae. The species was first described by Herbert Knowles Morrison in 1874. It is found in the Eastern parts of the United States and Canada.

The wingspan is 33–40 mm. Adults are on wing from August to September depending on the location. There is one generation per year.
