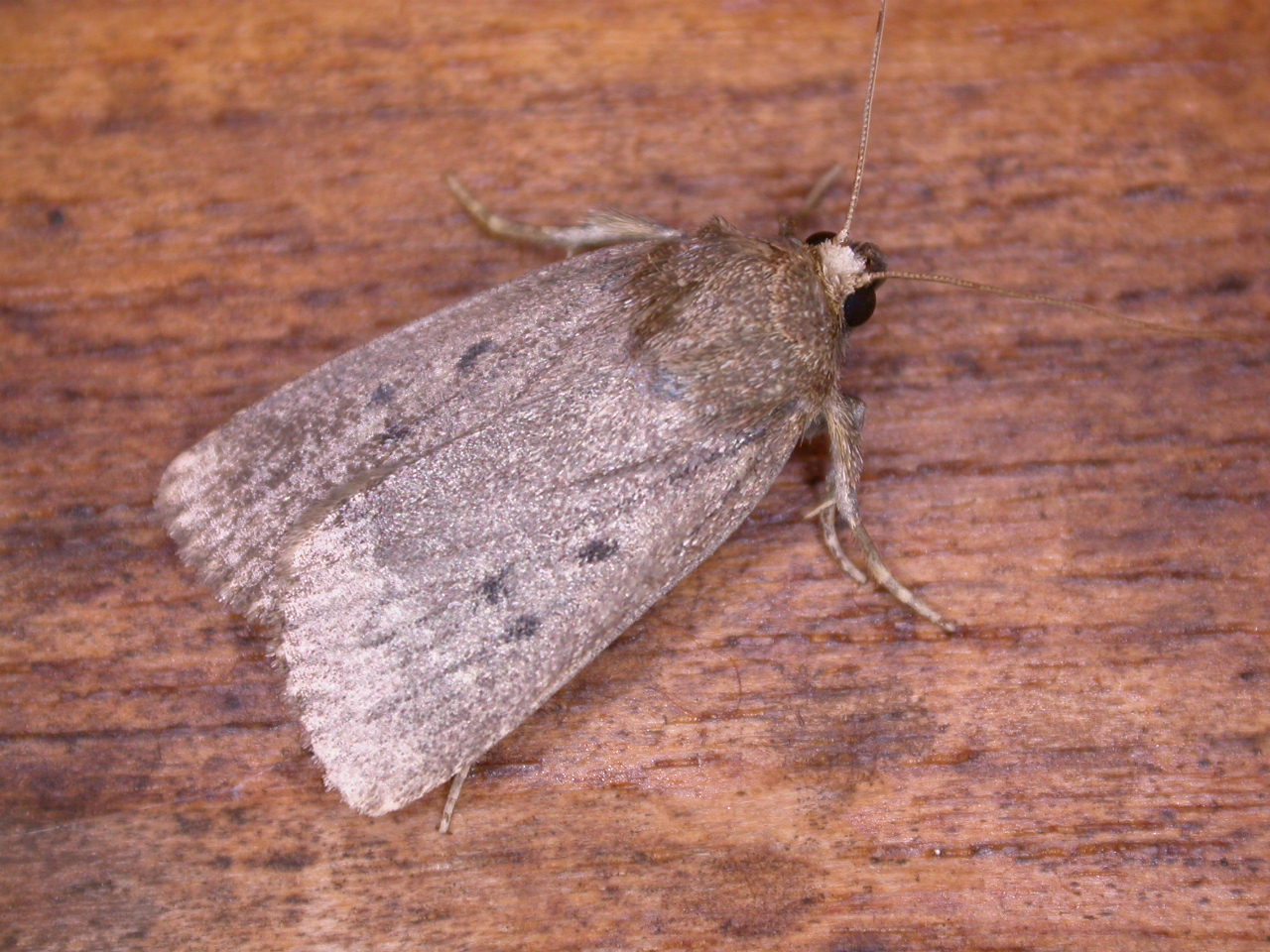

Scientific classification
- Domain: Eukaryota
- Kingdom: Animalia
- Phylum: Arthropoda
- Class: Insecta
- Order: Lepidoptera
- Superfamily: Noctuoidea
- Family: Noctuidae
- Genus: Amphipyra
- Species: A. tragopoginis

Binomial name
- Amphipyra tragopoginis (Clerck, 1759)

= Mouse moth =

Species of moth

The mouse moth (Amphipyra tragopoginis) is a moth of the family Noctuidae. It is a widespread species with a Holarctic distribution.

== Distribution ==
Europe (except the extreme north, and not occurring in the south of Spain, Sicily, or the Balkans); also in Armenia, Asia Minor, Syria, Iran, Western Siberia, Kashmir (extending thence into Punjab). Recently introduced in Canada and North America.

This is a rather drab but distinctive species. The forewings are uniform dark brown with three blackish spots arranged in a triangle. The hindwings are buffish, darker towards the margins. The wingspan is 32–40 mm. The common name derives from the species' habit of scuttling away on foot when disturbed rather than flying. Despite this, it can fly strongly and is attracted to light, sugar and nectar-rich flowers. In the British Isles, the adult is active from July to September.

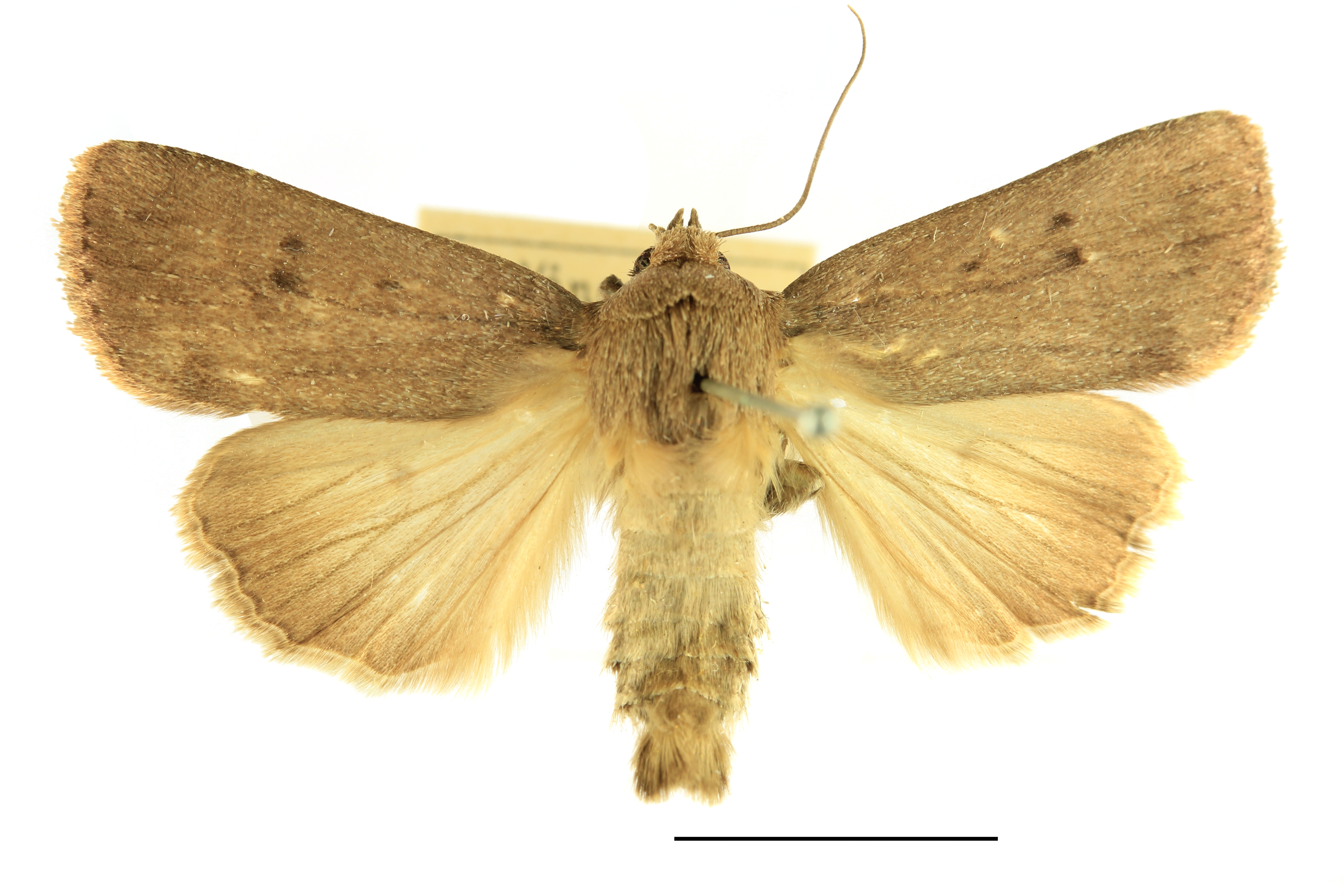

== Description ==
Forewing dull brown, dusted with paler scales, varying from pale to blackish brown; submarginal line only visible, indicated by a paler tinge preceded by a darker shade; orbicular stigma a blackish dot; reniform represented by two, one above the other, at end of cell; hindwing rufous fuscous, paler towards base; — turcomana Stgr. is pale ashy grey, with no trace of submarginal line, and the stigmata very faint and more or less obsolete; the hindwing also much paler, dull whitish, becoming grey towards termen; (this central Asiatic form is probably a good species: the forewing has the apex more decidedly prominent [A. t. subspecies turcomana Staudinger, 1888]); — the blacker forms are separated as ab. nigrescens Spul.

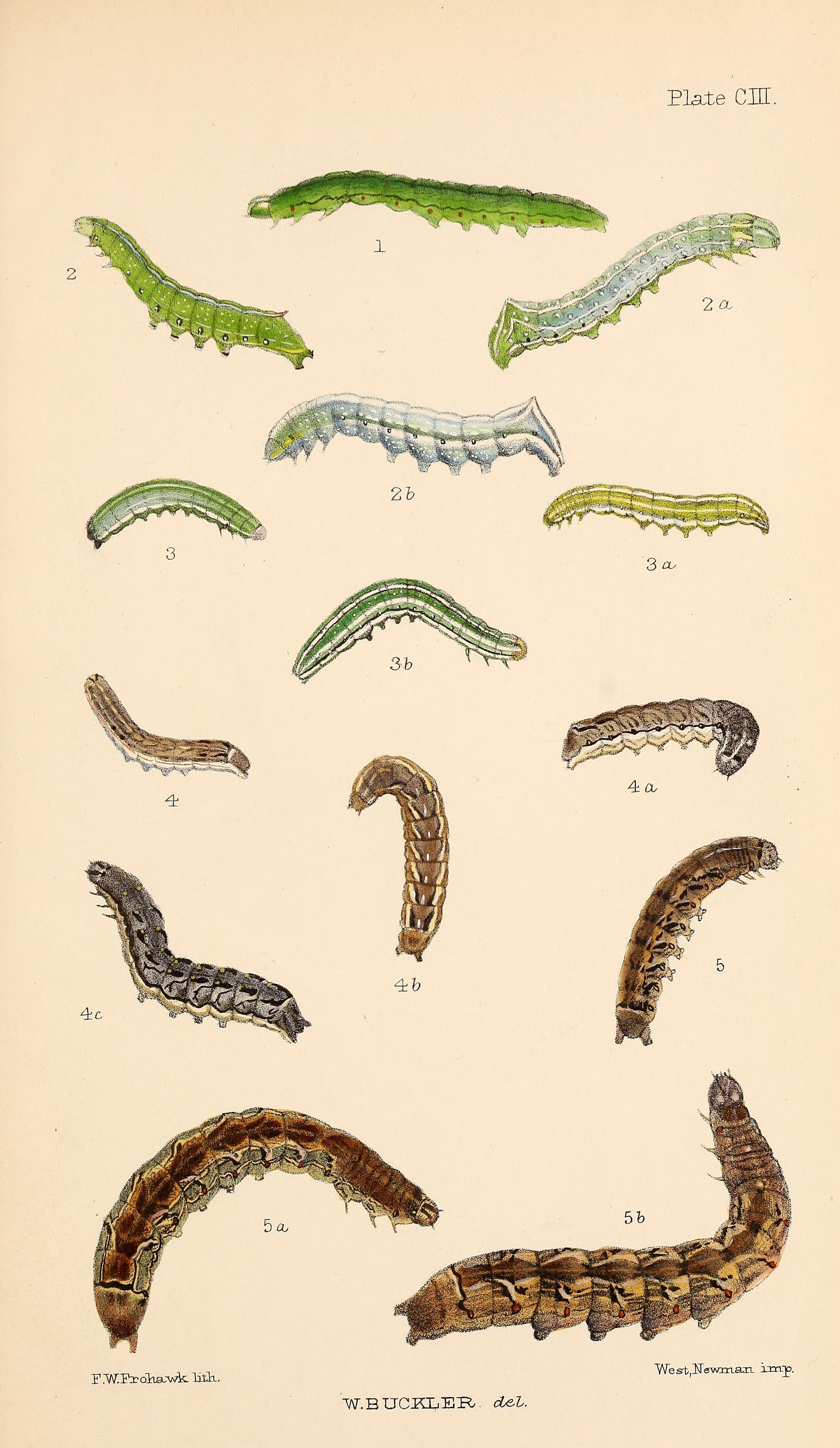
Figs. 3,3a,3b larvae after final moult

The larva is green dorsal and subdorsal lines yellowish or white lines and feeds on a wide variety of plants. The species overwinters as an egg.

== Ecology ==
Recorded food plants of the mouse moth include monkshood, chervil, dogbane, columbine, wormwood, bellflower, eastern redbud, hawthorn, fireweed, fennel, strawberry, bedstraw, geranium, Scots lovage, toadflax, cow-wheat, monkeyflower, tobacco, parsley, plantain, poplar, Prunus, oak, redcurrant, rose, cloudberry, sorrel, willow, salad burnet, nettle, indica, and grape.
