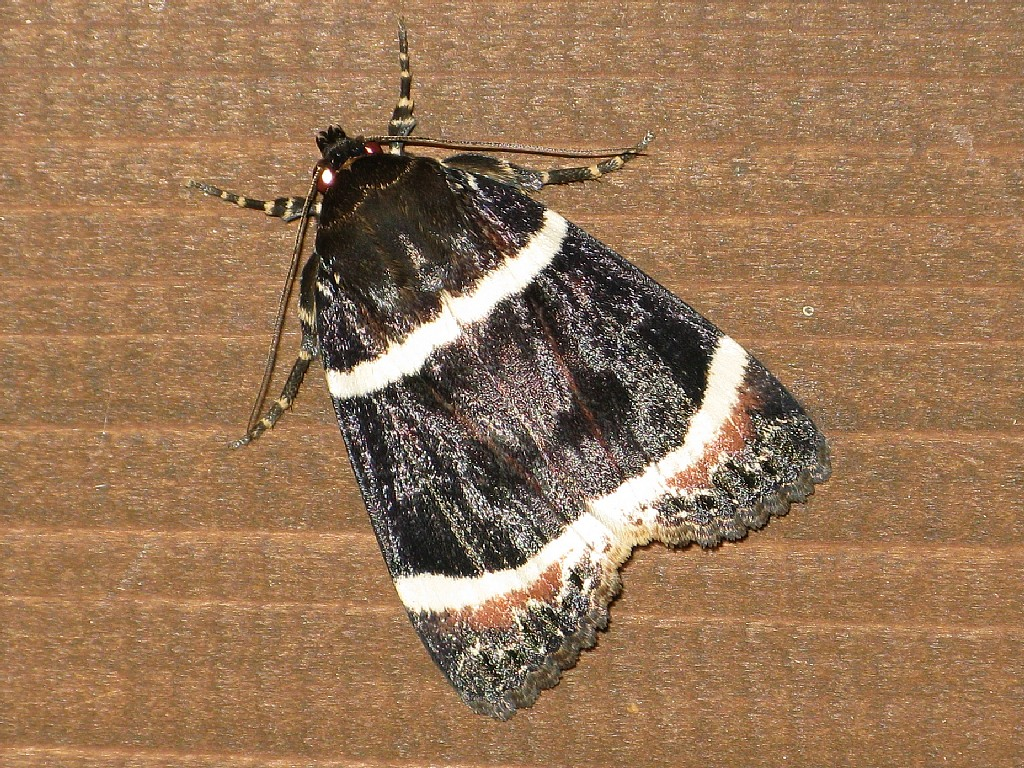

Scientific classification
- Kingdom: Animalia
- Phylum: Arthropoda
- Class: Insecta
- Order: Lepidoptera
- Superfamily: Noctuoidea
- Family: Noctuidae
- Genus: Amphipyra
- Species: A. tripartita

Binomial name
- Amphipyra tripartita Butler, 1878

Synonyms
- Amphipyra tripartita parvula Bryk, 1949

= Amphipyra tripartita =

Species of moth

Amphipyra tripartita is a moth in the family Noctuidae. It is found in China, Japan (Honshu, Shikoku, Kyushu, Tsushima Island), the Korean Peninsula, and the Russian Far East (Primorsky Krai).

The wingspan is 51–57 mm. The moth flies from August to October.

== Subspecies ==
The following subspecies is recognized by some sources:

- Amphipyra (Amphipyra) tripartita parvula Bryk, 1949
