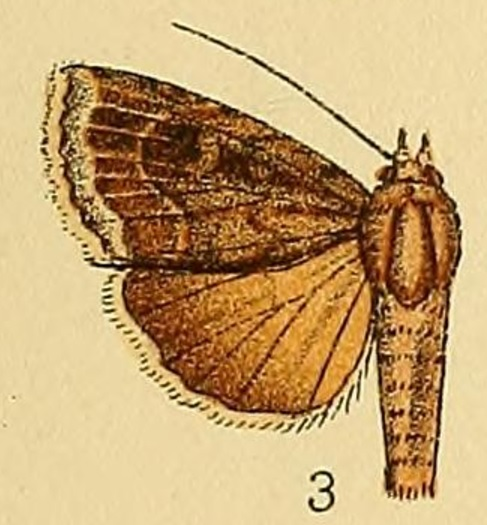
- George Hampson's illustration of a male A. alpherakii collected from West Turkestan

Scientific classification
- Domain: Eukaryota
- Kingdom: Animalia
- Phylum: Arthropoda
- Class: Insecta
- Order: Lepidoptera
- Superfamily: Noctuoidea
- Family: Noctuidae
- Genus: Amphipyra
- Species: A. alpherakii

Binomial name
- Amphipyra alpherakii (Staudinger, 1888)

Synonyms
- Amphipyra alpheraci Hampson, 1908

= Amphipyra alpherakii =

Species of moth

Amphipyra alpherakii is a moth in the family Noctuidae. It is found in China.

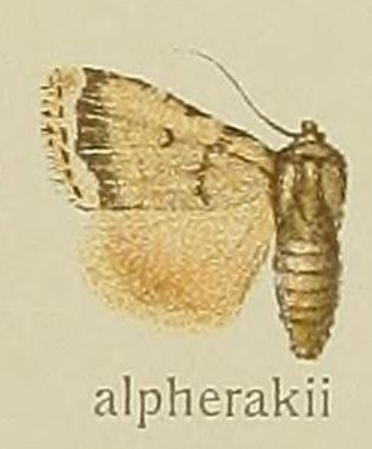
Illustration of Amphipyra alpherakii from William Warren
