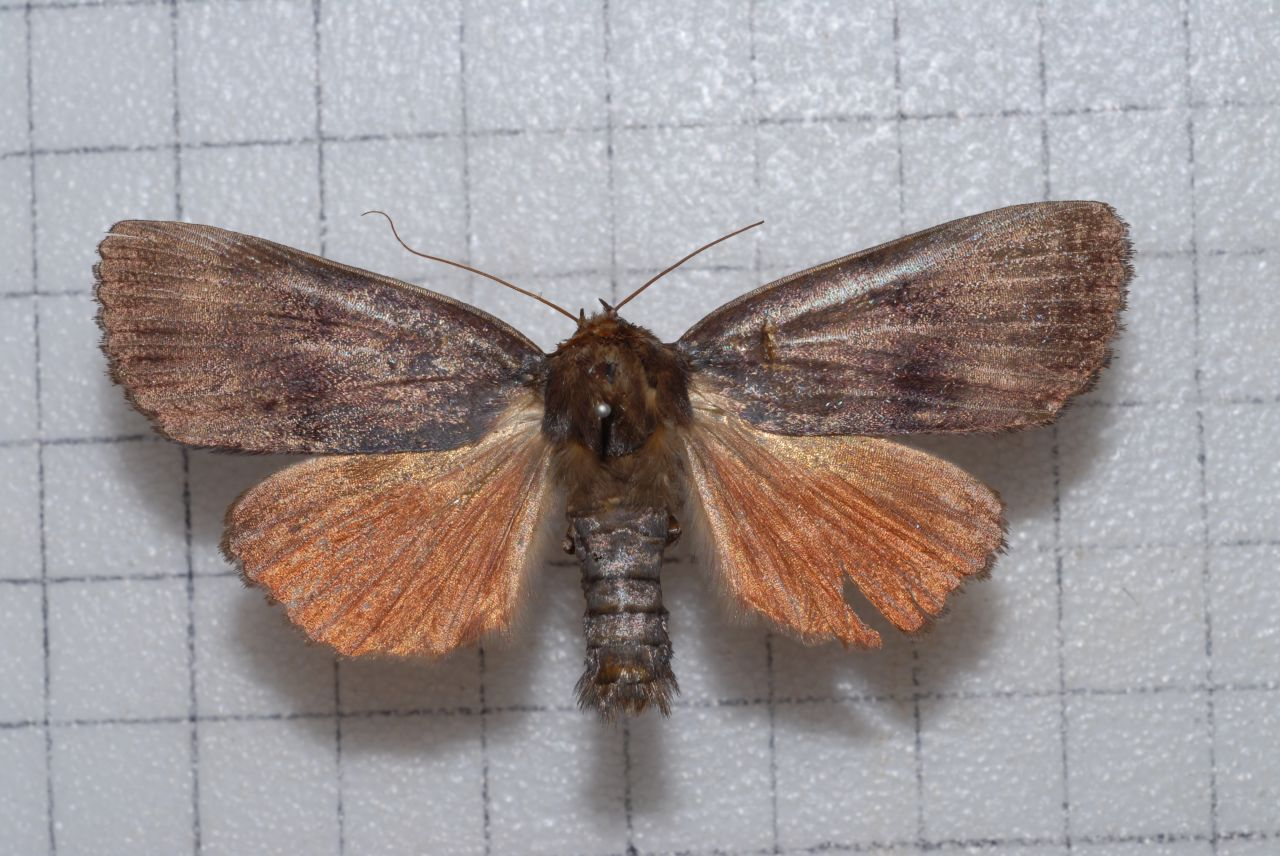

Scientific classification
- Domain: Eukaryota
- Kingdom: Animalia
- Phylum: Arthropoda
- Class: Insecta
- Order: Lepidoptera
- Superfamily: Noctuoidea
- Family: Noctuidae
- Genus: Amphipyra
- Species: A. fuscusa

Binomial name
- Amphipyra fuscusa Chang, 1989

Synonyms
- Amphipyra fuscosa Sugi, 1992

= Amphipyra fuscusa =

Species of moth

Amphipyra fuscusa is a moth in the family Noctuidae first described by Wei-Chun Chang in 1989. It is found in Taiwan.
