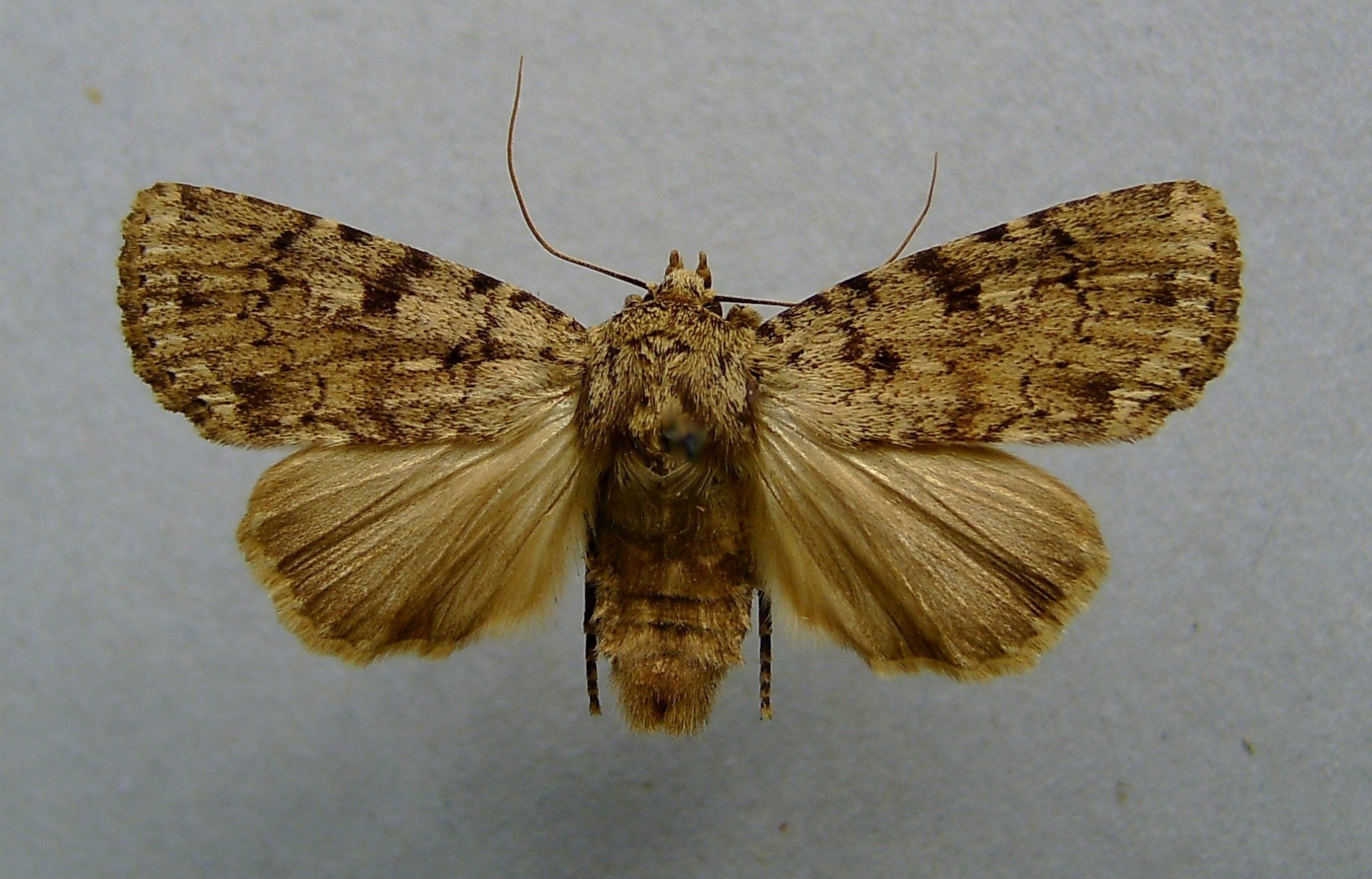

Scientific classification
- Kingdom: Animalia
- Phylum: Arthropoda
- Class: Insecta
- Order: Lepidoptera
- Superfamily: Noctuoidea
- Family: Noctuidae
- Genus: Amphipyra
- Species: A. effusa

Binomial name
- Amphipyra effusa Boisduval, 1828

Synonyms
- Pyrois effusa (Boisduval, 1828)

= Amphipyra effusa =

Species of moth

Amphipyra effusa is a moth in the family Noctuidae. It is found from the Mediterranean region and Asia.

The wingspan is 41–48 mm. The moth flies from May to September.In southern France (Hérault) it is often encountered in the caves of Occitania, mating here for a long time (summer).

The larvae feed on various plants, including Ferula, Populus, Erica, Cytisus and Cistus.
