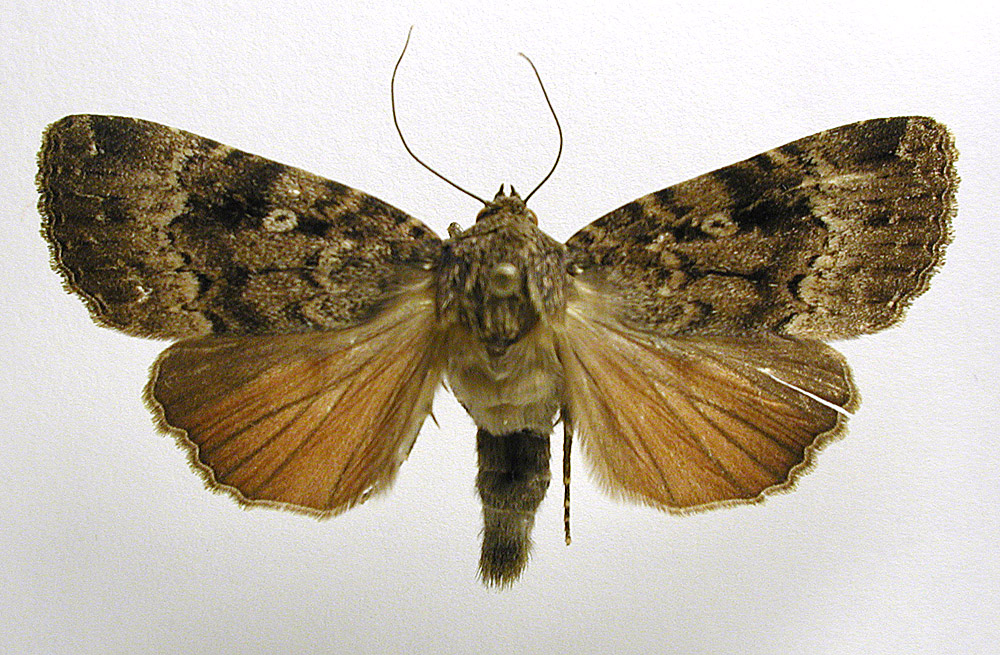

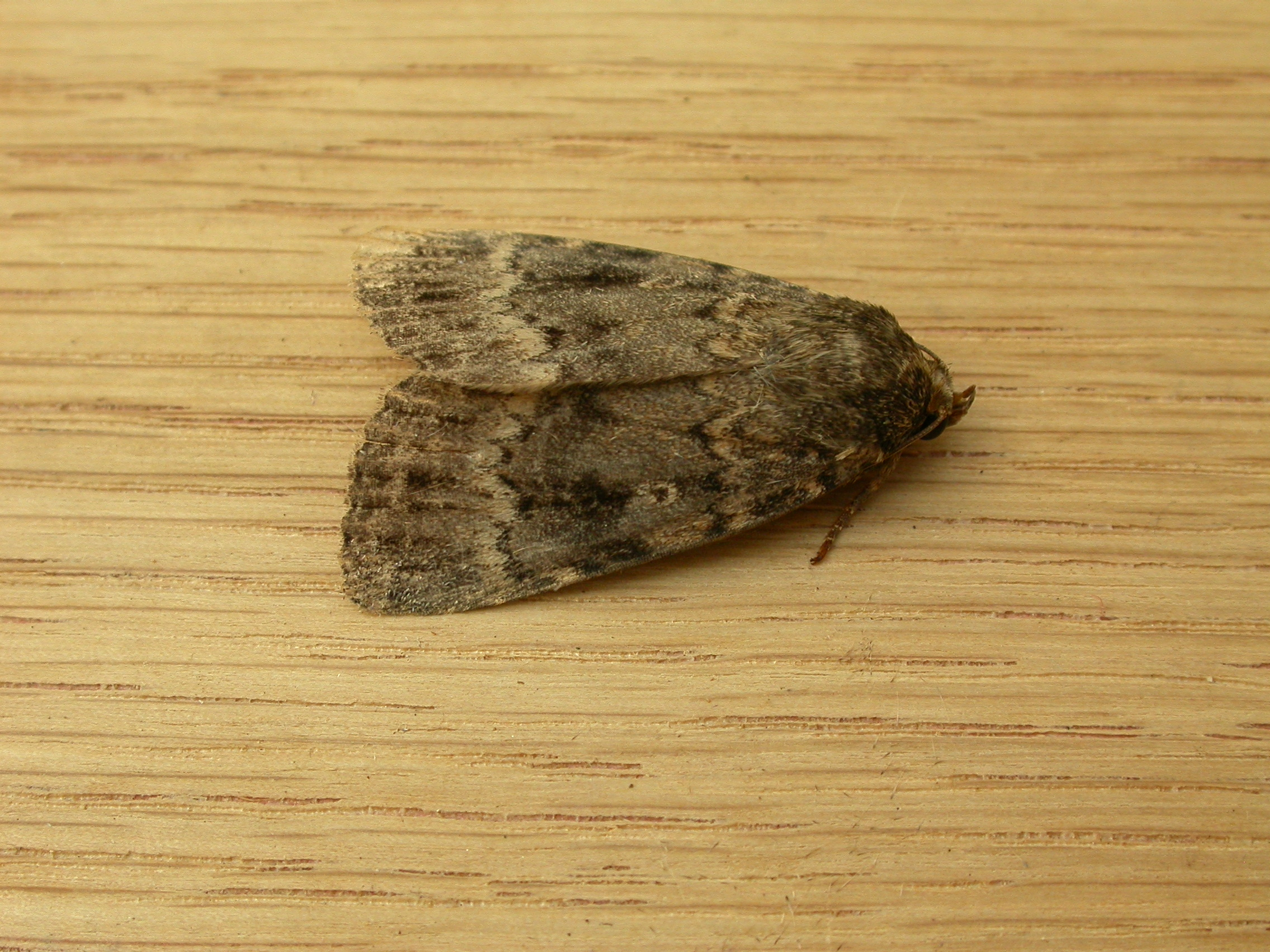

Scientific classification
- Kingdom: Animalia
- Phylum: Arthropoda
- Class: Insecta
- Order: Lepidoptera
- Superfamily: Noctuoidea
- Family: Noctuidae
- Genus: Amphipyra
- Species: A. berbera

Binomial name
- Amphipyra berbera Rungs, 1949

= Svensson's copper underwing =

Species of moth

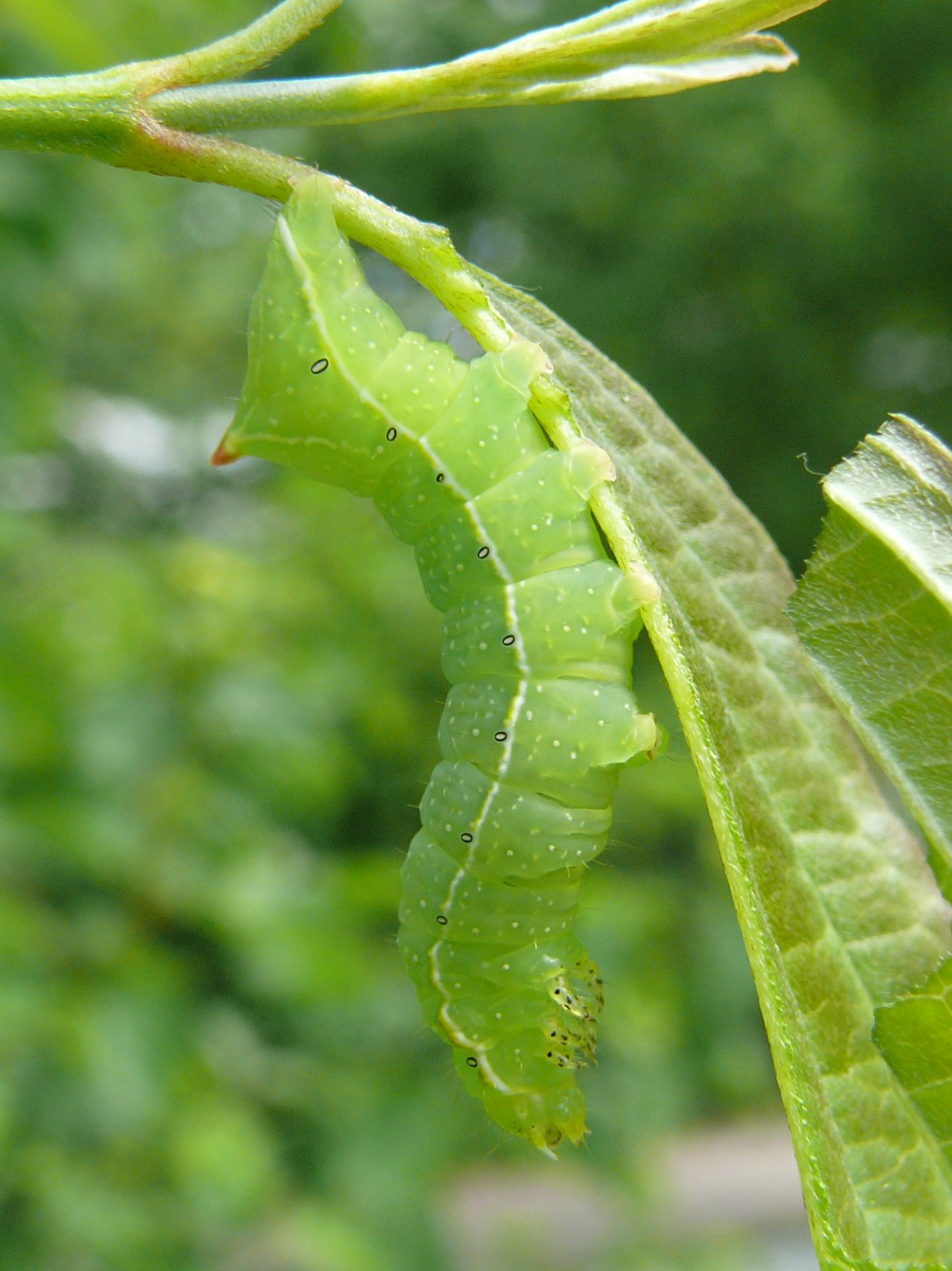
Caterpillar

Svensson's copper underwing (Amphipyra berbera) is a moth of the family Noctuidae. The species was first described by Charles E. Rungs in 1949. It is distributed throughout Europe including Russia east to the Urals.

This species has a wingspan of 47–56 mm, the female usually larger than the male. The forewings are brown, marked with pale fascia and a dark-centred pale stigma. The hindwings are bright copper-coloured. This species is very similar to the copper underwing (Amphipyra pyramidea) but can usually be distinguished by the pattern on the underside of the hindwings: A. pyramidea has a pale central area, contrasting strongly with darker margins; A berbera is much more uniformly coloured. See Townsend et al.

A. berbera flies at night from July to September (Note: The flight season refers to the British Isles. This may vary in other parts of the range.) and is attracted to light and strongly to sugar.

The larva feeds on a range of trees and shrubs (see list below). The species overwinters as an egg.

== Recorded food plants ==
- Acer – sycamore maple
- Carpinus – hornbeam
- Populus – aspen
- Quercus – oak
- Rhododendron
- Salix – willow
- Sorbus – rowan
- Syringa – lilac
- Tilia – lime
- Wisteria – Wisteria sinensis
