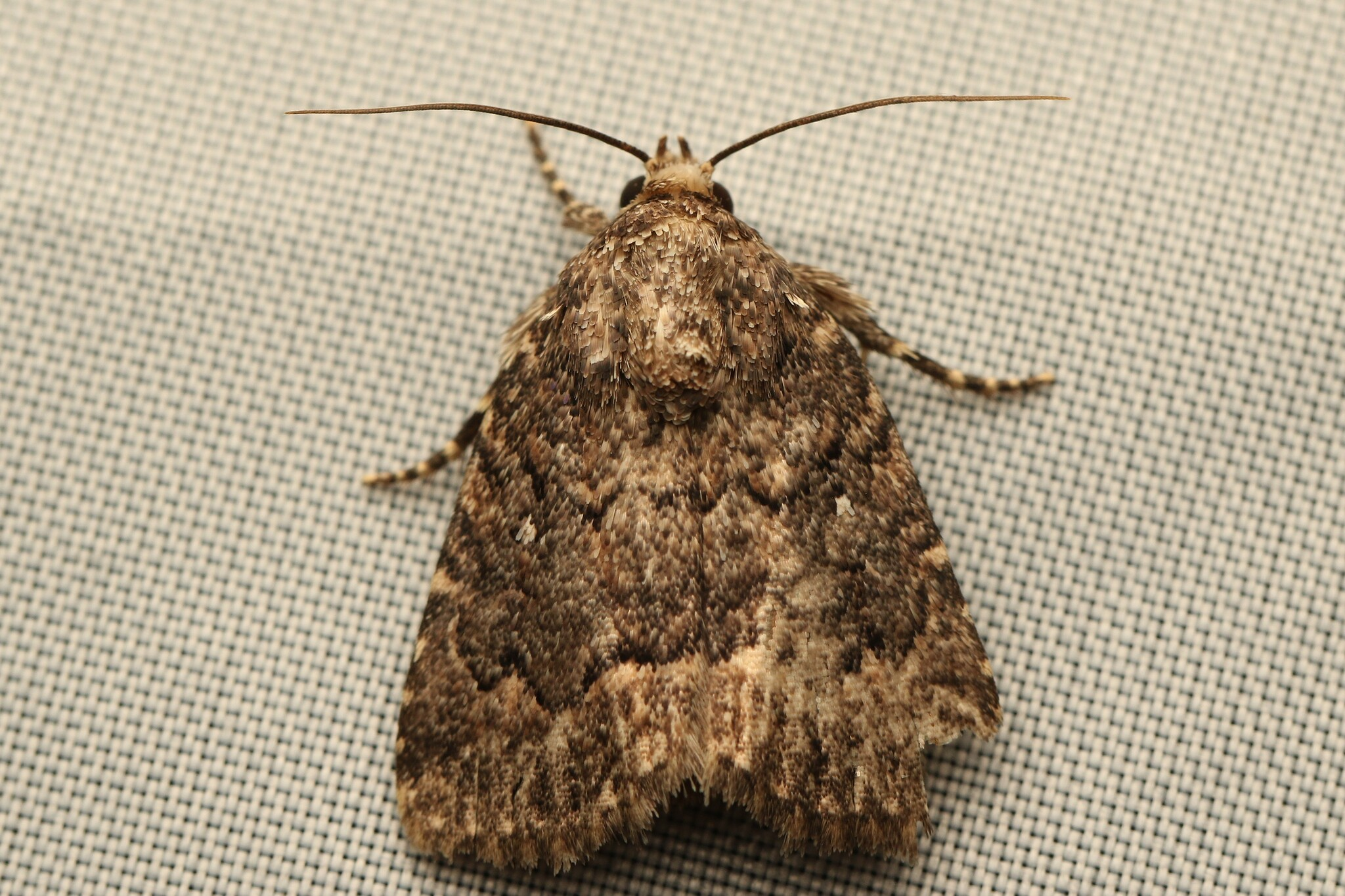
- Amphipyra micans in Israel

Scientific classification
- Kingdom: Animalia
- Phylum: Arthropoda
- Clade: Pancrustacea
- Class: Insecta
- Order: Lepidoptera
- Superfamily: Noctuoidea
- Family: Noctuidae
- Genus: Amphipyra
- Species: A. micans

Binomial name
- Amphipyra micans Lederer, 1857

Synonyms
- Amphipyra frivaldszkyi Mocsáry, 1896

= Amphipyra micans =

Species of moth

Amphipyra micans is a moth in the family Noctuidae. It is found from Bulgaria and the Balkans south to Greece, east to Turkey and south to Lebanon.

The wingspan is about 30 mm. Adults are on wing from July to September.

The larvae feed on Gallium mollugo.
