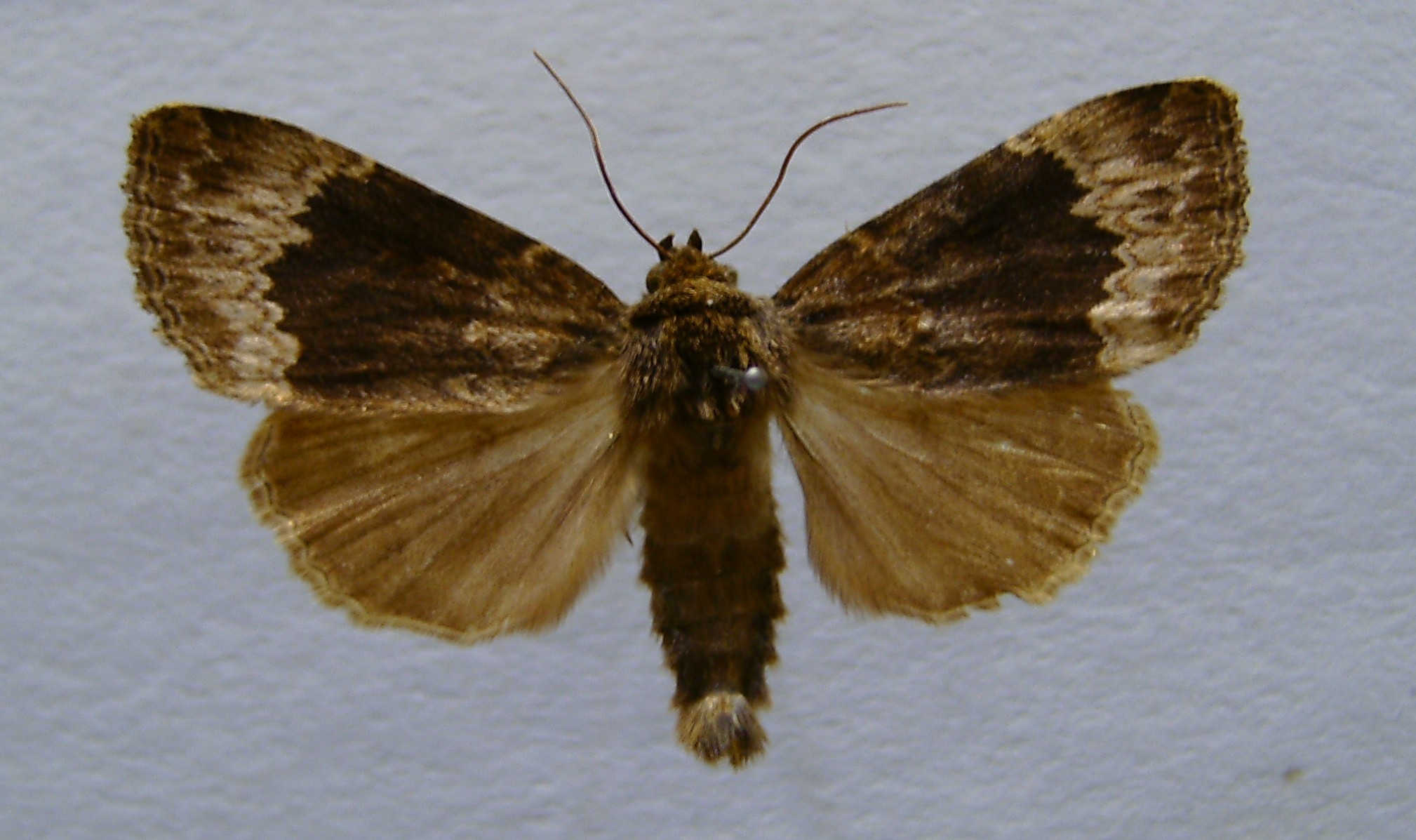

Scientific classification
- Kingdom: Animalia
- Phylum: Arthropoda
- Clade: Pancrustacea
- Class: Insecta
- Order: Lepidoptera
- Superfamily: Noctuoidea
- Family: Noctuidae
- Genus: Amphipyra
- Species: A. perflua

Binomial name
- Amphipyra perflua (Fabricius, 1787)

= Amphipyra perflua =

Species of moth

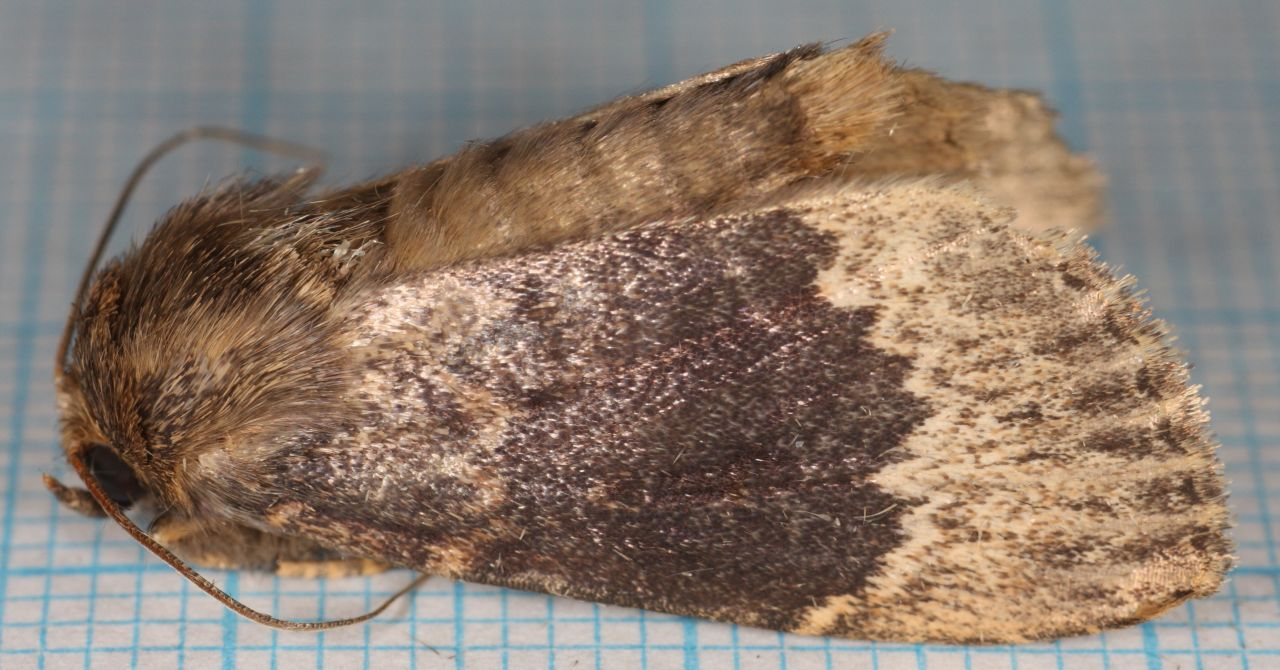

Amphipyra perflua is a moth in the family Noctuidae. It is found from Northern Europe, through Siberia as far east as Korea.

The wingspan is 44–54 mm. The moth flies from July to September in one generation.

The larvae feed on various deciduous trees, such as Crataegus, Populus, Salix, Ulmus, Corylus, Prunus spinosa and Malus.
