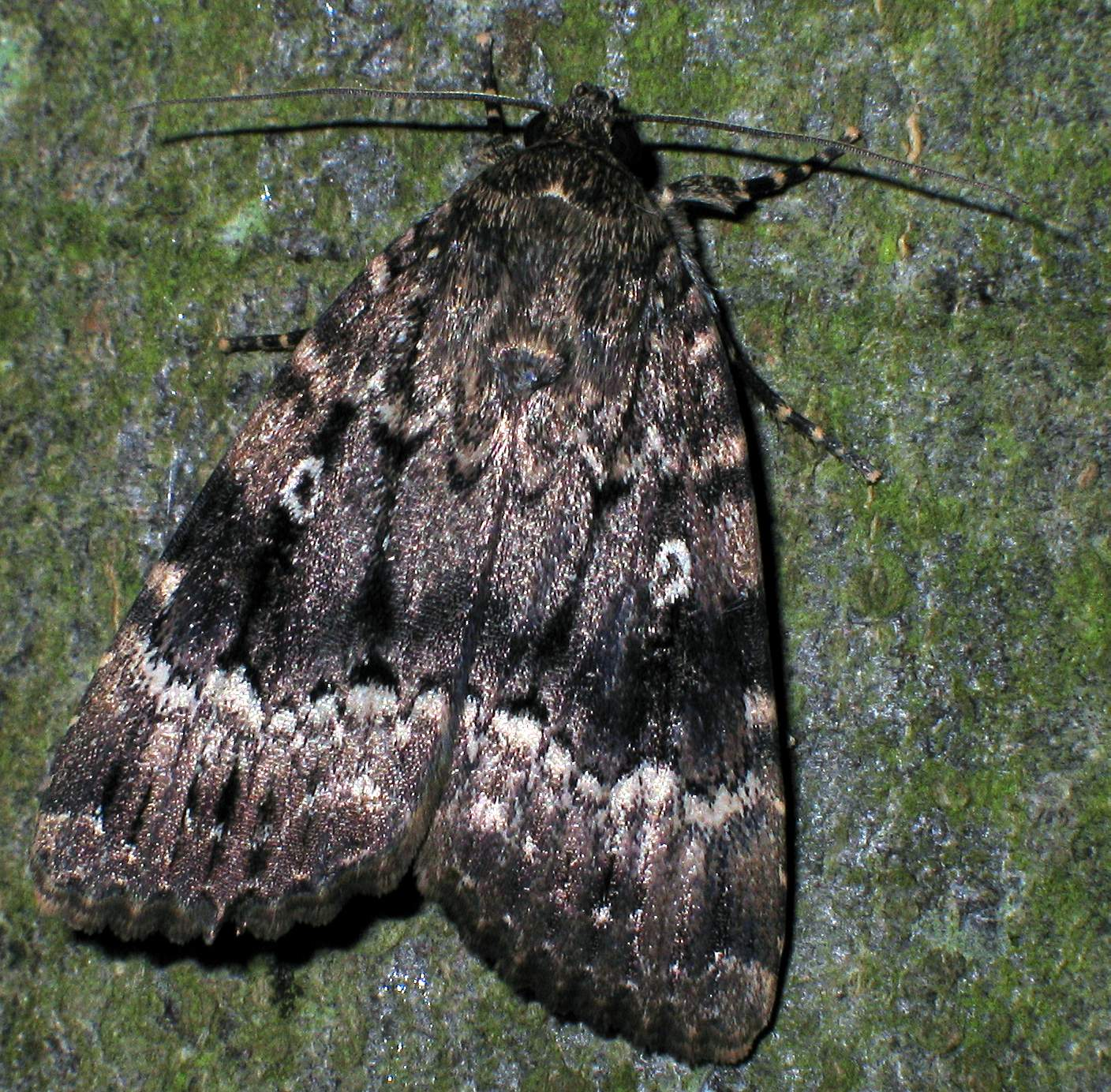
- Amphipyra pyramidea (Copper underwing)

Scientific classification
- Kingdom: Animalia
- Phylum: Arthropoda
- Class: Insecta
- Order: Lepidoptera
- Superfamily: Noctuoidea
- Family: Noctuidae
- Subfamily: Amphipyrinae
- Tribe: Amphipyrini
- Genus: Amphipyra; Ochsenheimer, 1816

Synonyms
- Pyrois Hübner, [1820]; Scotophila Hübner, [1820]; Pyrophila Stephens, 1829; Syntomopus Guenée, 1837; Philopyra Guenée, 1838; Neocomia Rougemont, 1901; Pyramidcampa Beck, 1991; Adpyramidcampa Beck, 1991; Adamphipyra Beck, 1991; Tetrapyra Beck, 1991; Antiamphipyra Beck, 1991; Anpyramidea Beck, 1996; Obtuscampa Beck, 1996

= Amphipyra =

Genus of moths

Amphipyra is a genus of moths in the family Noctuidae, the only genus in the tribe Amphipyrini.

== Selected species ==
The following species are recognised in the genus Amphipyra:

- Amphipyra acheron Draudt, 1950
- Amphipyra albicilia Hampson, 1894
- Amphipyra albolineola Yoshimoto, 1993
- Amphipyra alpherakii (Staudinger, 1888)
- Amphipyra amentet Babics, Benedek & Saldaitis, 2013
- Amphipyra anophthalma Boursin, 1963
- Amphipyra averna Hreblay & Ronkay, 1997
- Amphipyra berbera Rungs, 1949 – Svensson's copper underwing
- Amphipyra boursini Hacker, 1998
- Amphipyra brunneoatra Strand, 1916
- Amphipyra cancellata Warren, 1911
- Amphipyra charon Draudt, 1950
- Amphipyra cinnamomea (Goeze, 1781)
- Amphipyra costiplaga Draudt, 1950
- Amphipyra cupreipennis Moore, 1882
- Amphipyra deleta Draudt, 1950
- Amphipyra deletaiwana Hreblay & Ronkay, 1998
- Amphipyra effusa Boisduval, 1829
- Amphipyra erebina Butler, 1878
- Amphipyra formosana Hacker & Ronkay, 1998
- Amphipyra fuscusa Chang, 1989
- Amphipyra glabella (Morrison, 1874) – grey amphipyra or smooth amphipyra
- Amphipyra herrichschaefferi Hacker & Peks, 1998
- Amphipyra herzigi Hreblay & Ronkay, 1998
- Amphipyra horiei Owada, 1996
- Amphipyra jankowskii Oberthür, 1884
- Amphipyra kautti Hacker, 2002
- Amphipyra livida (Denis & Schiffermüller, 1775)
- Amphipyra magna Walker, 1865
- Amphipyra marmorea Hreblay & Ronkay, 1998
- Amphipyra micans Lederer, 1857
- Amphipyra microlitha Hreblay & Ronkay, 1998
- Amphipyra molybdea Christoph, 1867
- Amphipyra monochroma Yoshimoto, 1993
- Amphipyra monolitha Guenée, 1852
- Amphipyra okinawensis Sugi, 1982
- Amphipyra owadai Hreblay, Peregovits & Ronkay, 1999
- Amphipyra pallidipennis Hreblay & Ronkay, 1998
- Amphipyra perflua (Fabricius, 1787)
- Amphipyra porphyrea Hreblay & Ronkay, 1998
- Amphipyra pyramidea (Linnaeus, 1758) – copper underwing, humped green fruitworm, or pyramidal green fruitworm
- Amphipyra pyramidoides Guenée, 1852 – copper underwing
- Amphipyra schrenckii Ménétriés, 1859
- Amphipyra sergei (Staudinger, 1888)
- Amphipyra shyrshana Chang, 1989
- Amphipyra stix Herrich-Schäffer, 1850
- Amphipyra striata Bremer & Grey, 1853
- Amphipyra strigata D. S. Fletcher, 1968
- Amphipyra subtrigua Bremer & Grey, 1853
- Amphipyra suryai Yoshimoto, 1993
- Amphipyra tetra (Fabricius, 1787)
- Amphipyra tragopoginis (Clerck, 1759) – mouse moth
- Amphipyra tripartita Butler, 1878
