= Amphipyra molybdea =

Scientific classification
- Domain: Eukaryota
- Kingdom: Animalia
- Phylum: Arthropoda
- Class: Insecta
- Order: Lepidoptera
- Superfamily: Noctuoidea
- Family: Noctuidae
- Genus: Amphipyra
- Species: A. molybdea

Binomial name
- Amphipyra molybdea Christoph, 1867

Synonyms
- Amphipyra submicans Kuznetzov, 1958

Species of moth

Amphipyra molybdea is a moth in the family Noctuidae. It is found from southern Russia, south to Turkey.
