= List of Silene species =

The following species in the genus Silene are recognised by Plants of the World Online:

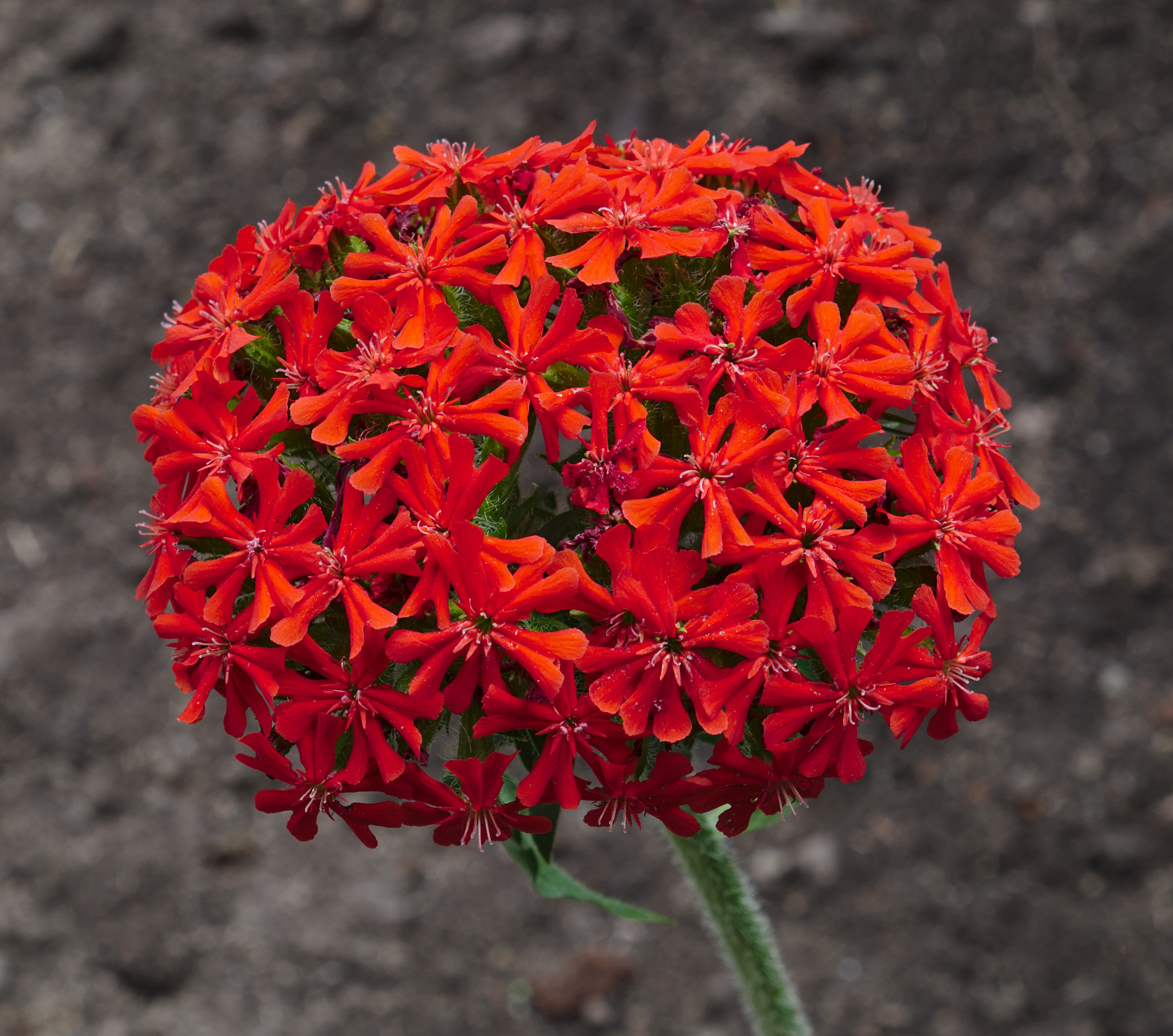
Silene chalcedonica

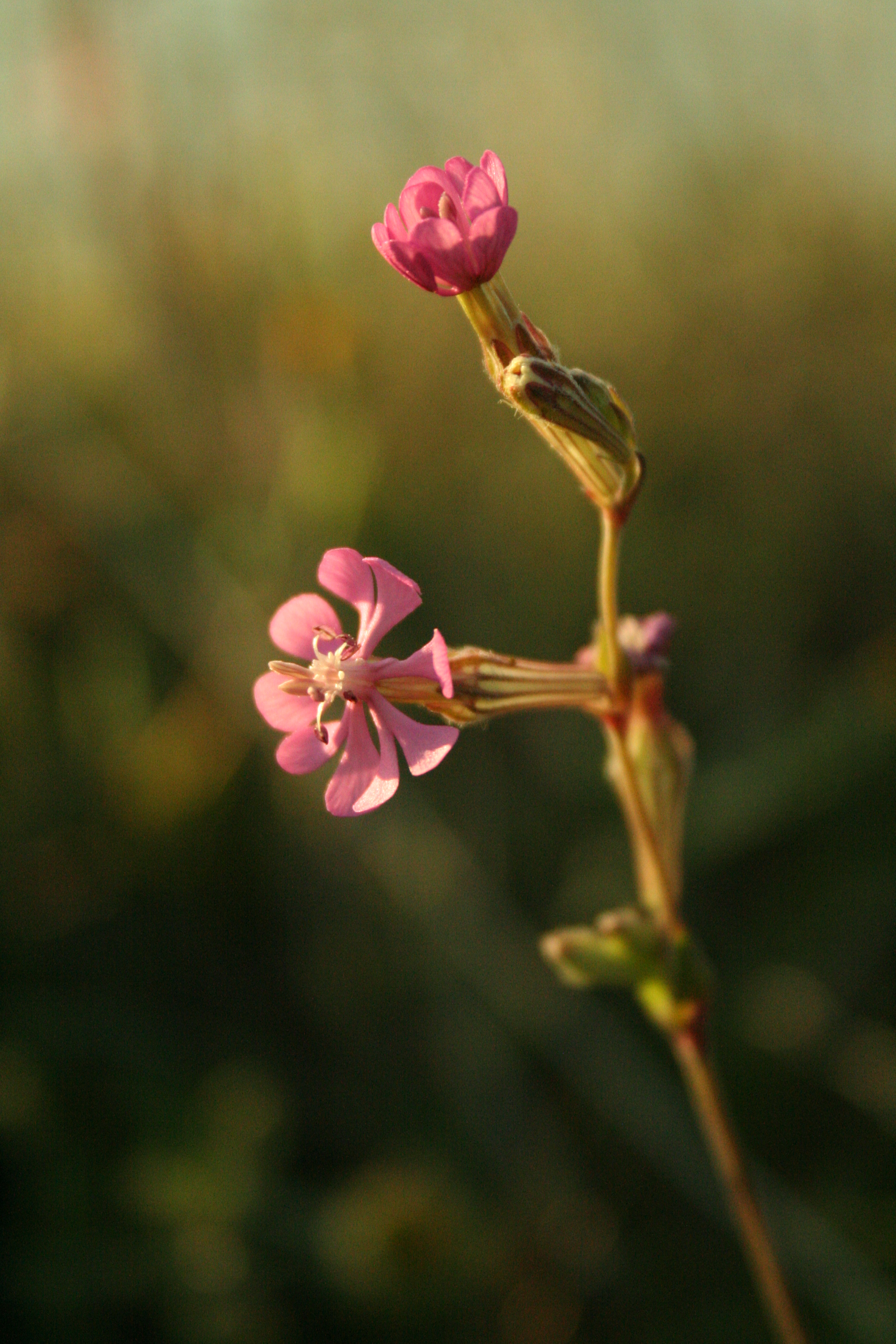
Silene colorata

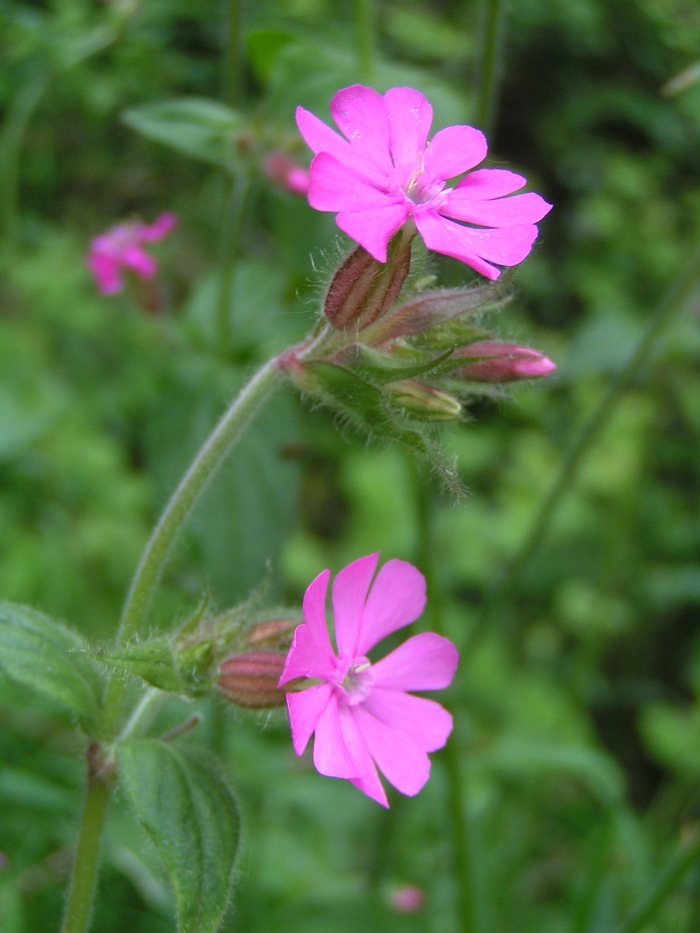
Silene dioica

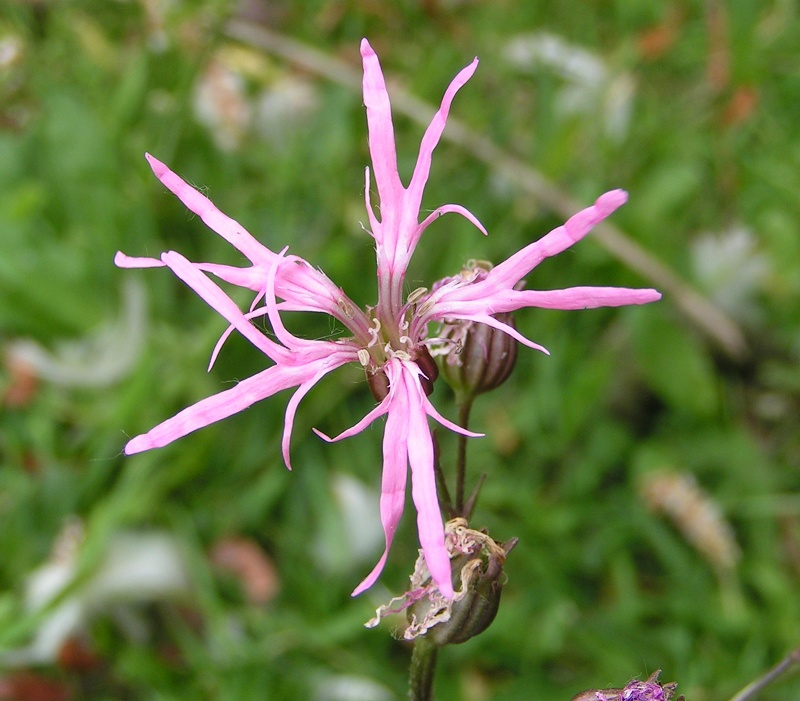
Silene flos-cuculi (ragged robin)

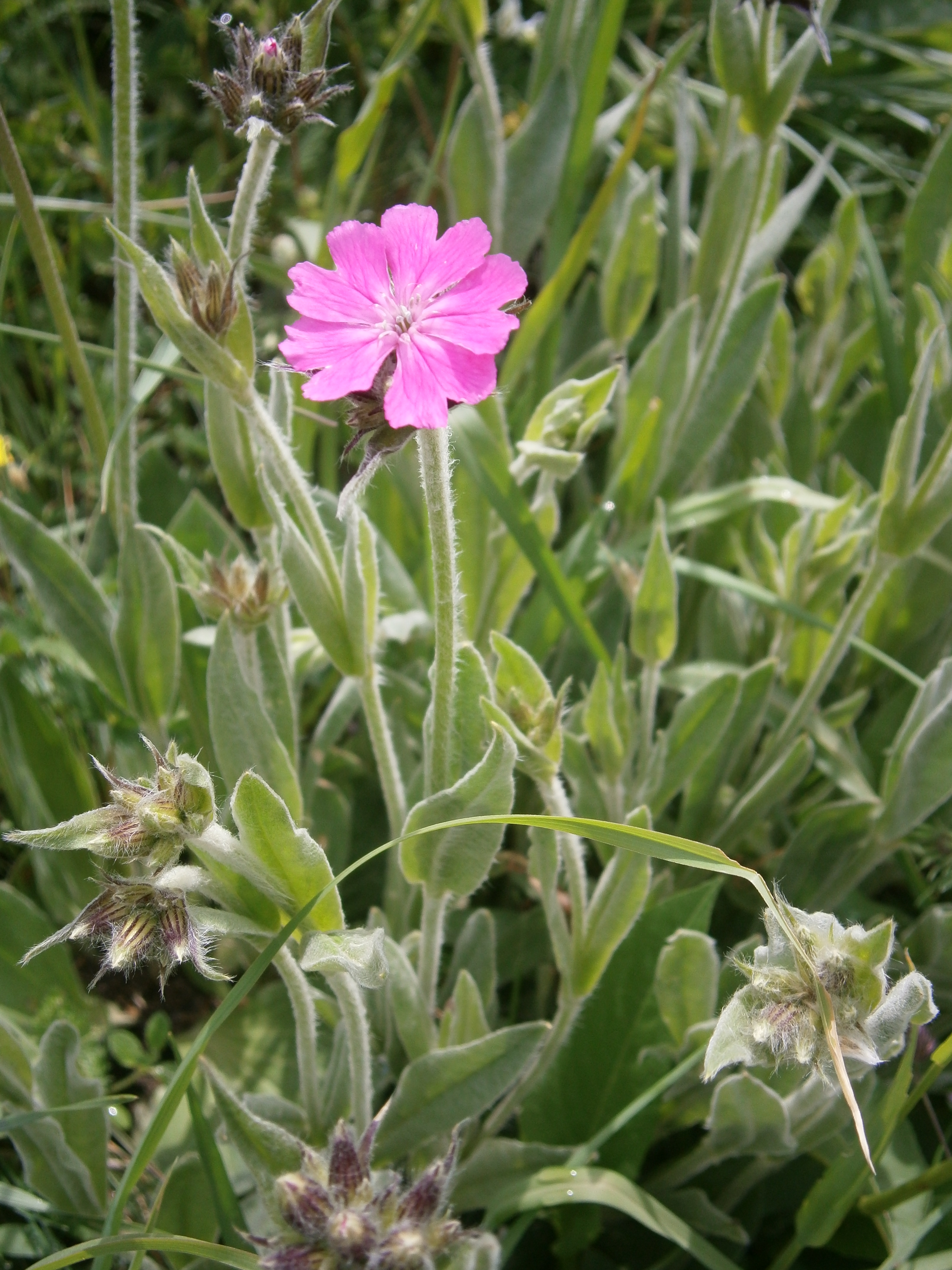
Silene flos-jovis

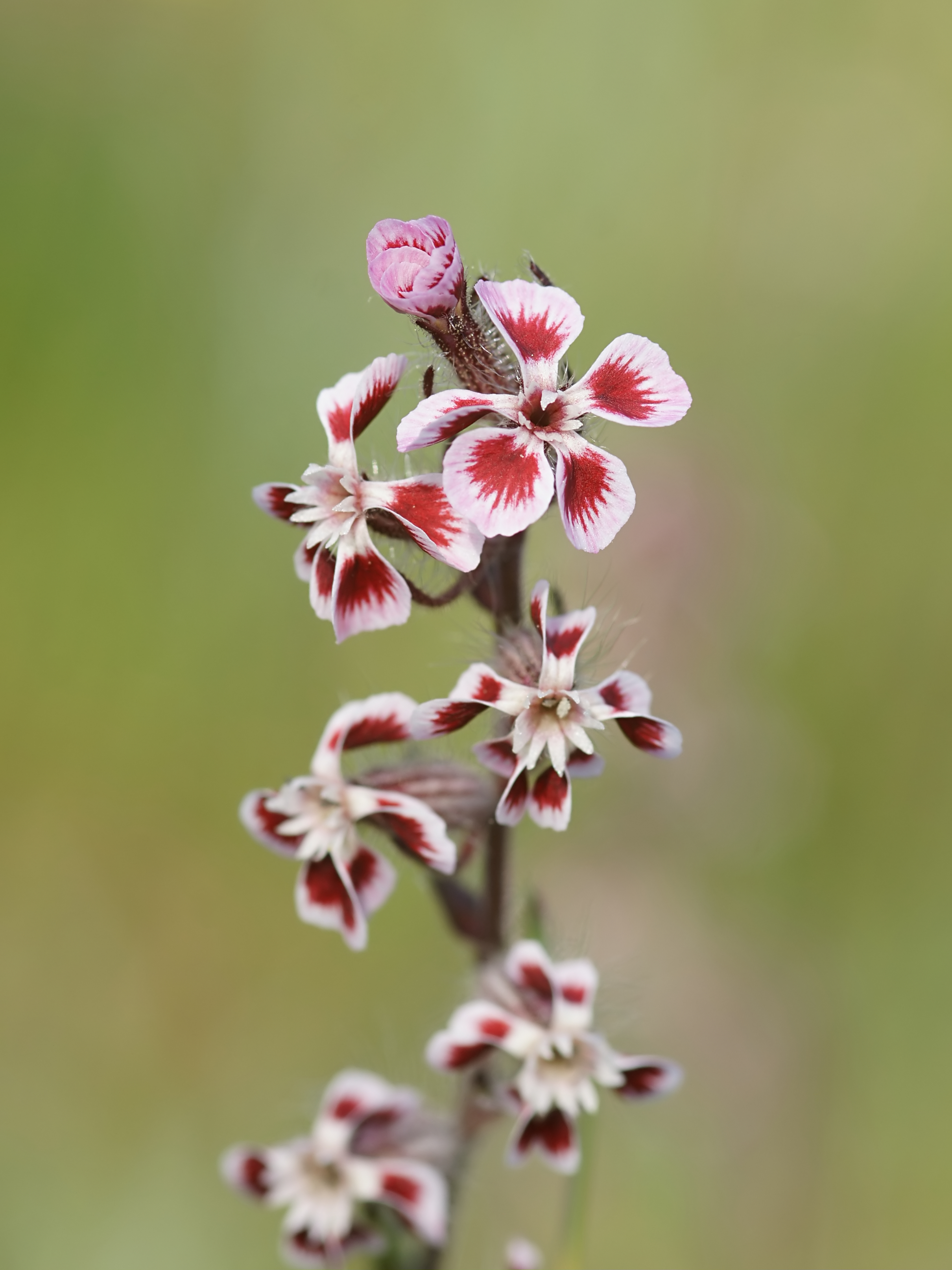
Silene gallica var. quinquevulnera

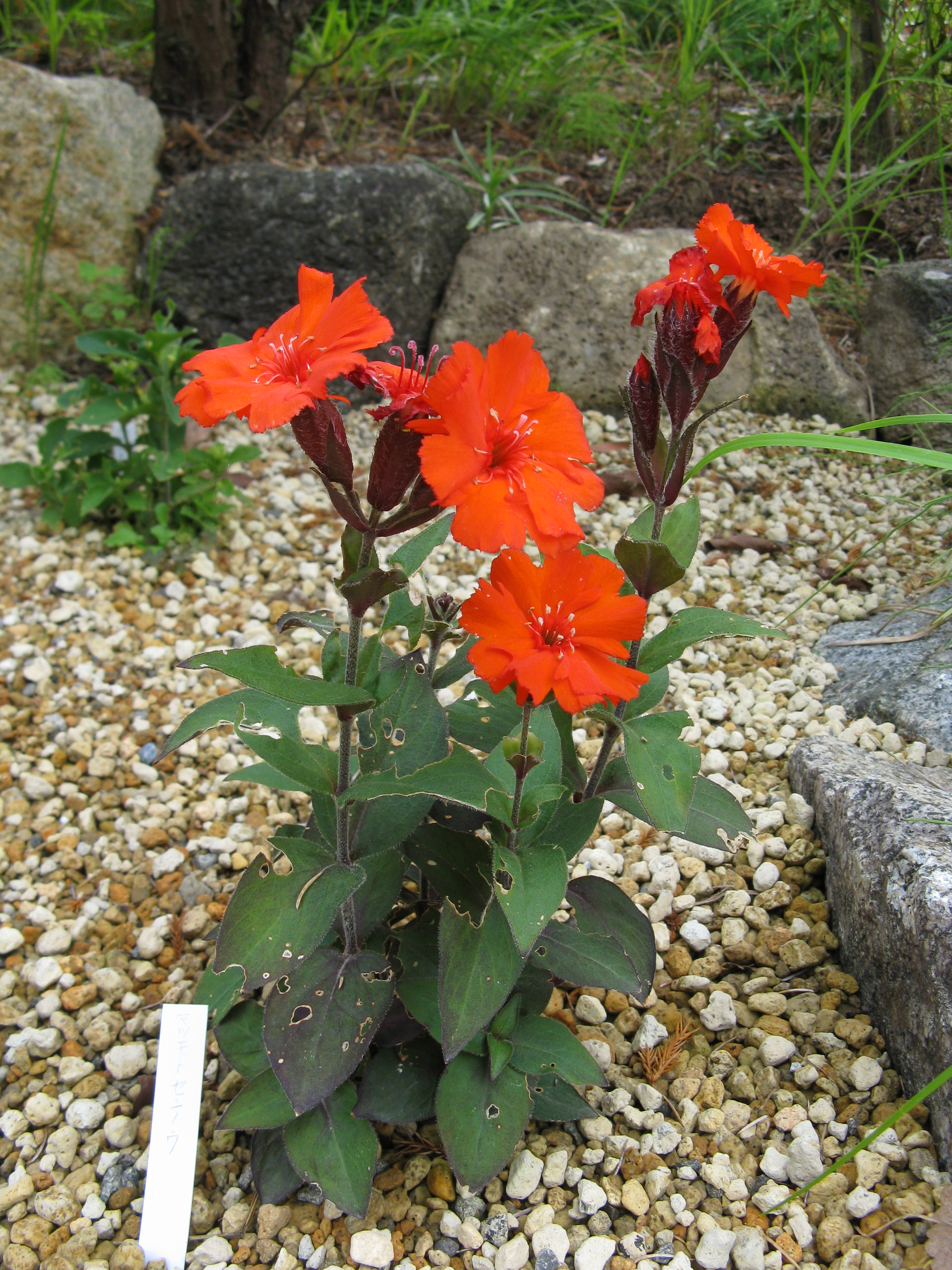
Silene sieboldii

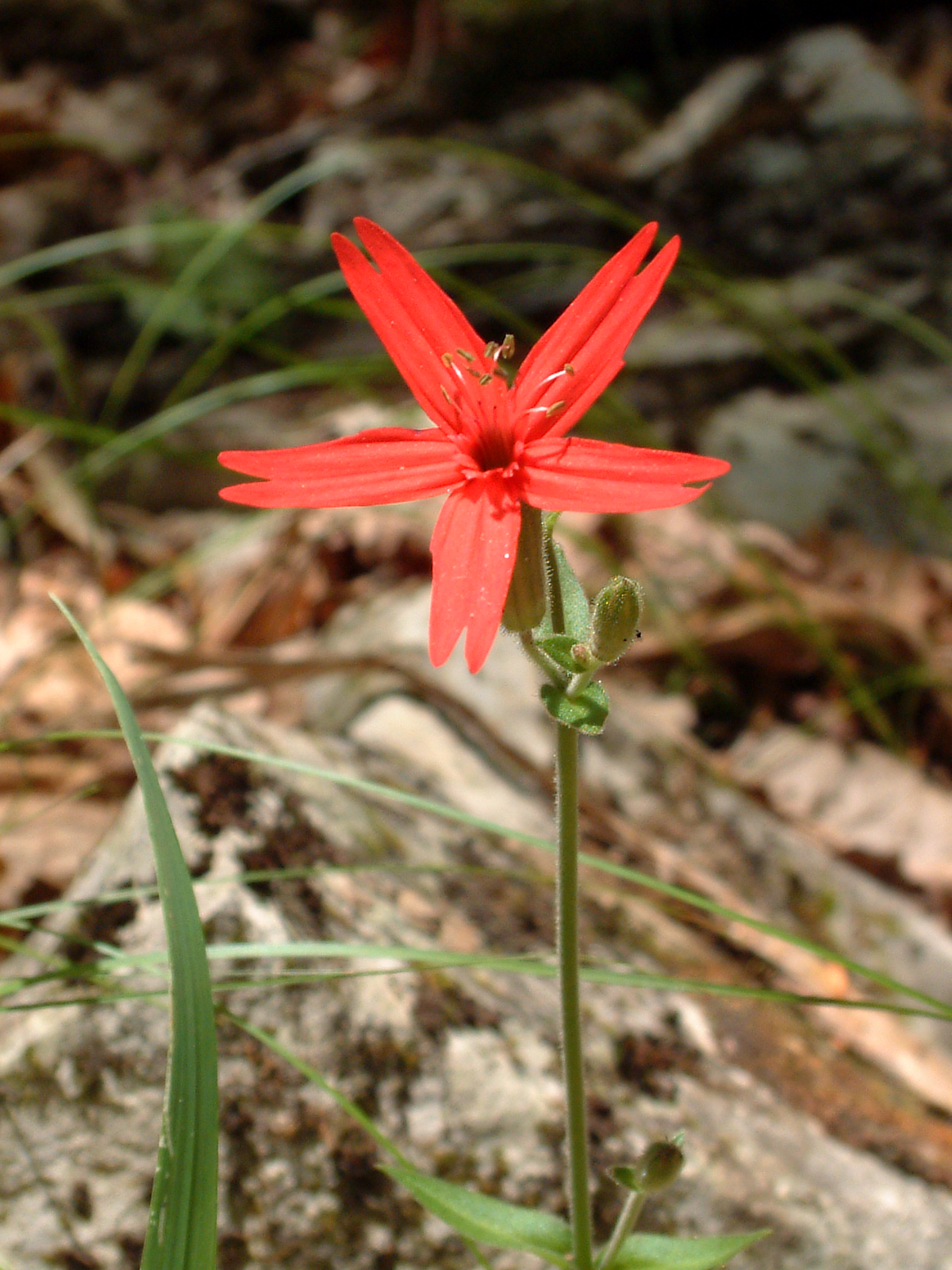
Silene virginica

- Silene abietum Font Quer & Maire
- Silene acaulis (L.) Jacq. – moss campion
- Silene acutidentata Bondarenko & Vved.
- Silene acutifolia Link ex Rohrb.
- Silene adelphiae Runemark
- Silene adenocalyx F.N.Williams
- Silene adenopetala Raikova
- Silene adenophora (Schischk.) Czerep.
- Silene aegaea Oxelman
- Silene aegyptiaca (L.) L.f.
- Silene aellenii Sennen
- Silene aeoniopsis Bornm.
- Silene aethiopica Burm.f.
- Silene affghanica Rohrb.
- Silene ajanensis (Regel & Tiling) Vorosch.
- Silene akaisialpina (T.Yamaz.) H.Ohashi, Tateishi & H.Nakai
- Silene akinfijewii Schmalh.
- Silene akiyamae Rajbh. & Mits.Suzuki
- Silene akmaniana Ekim & Çelik
- Silene alaschanica (Maxim.) Bocquet
- Silene albescens Boiss.
- Silene alexandri Hillebr. – Kamalo Gulch catchfly
- Silene alexandrina (Asch.) Danin
- Silene alexeji Kolak.
- Silene almolae J.Gay
- Silene alpestris Willd. ex Nyman - alpine catch-fly
- Silene alpicola Schischk.
- Silene altaica Pers.
- Silene ammophila Boiss. & Heldr.
- Silene amoena L.
- Silene ampullata Boiss.
- Silene anatolica Melzh. & A.Baytop
- Silene andarabica Podlech
- Silene andicola Gillies ex Hook. & Arn.
- Silene andryalifolia Pomel
- Silene antarctica (Kuntze) Pedersen
- Silene antirrhina L. – sleepy catchfly
- Silene antri-jovis Greuter & Burdet
- Silene aomorensis M.Mizush.
- Silene aperta Greene – naked catchfly
- Silene apetala Willd.
- Silene aprica Turcz. ex Fisch. & C.A.Mey.
- Silene arabica Boiss.
- Silene araratica Schischk.
- Silene arenarioides Desf.
- Silene arenosa K.Koch
- Silene argaea Fisch. & C.A.Mey.
- Silene argentea Ledeb.
- Silene argentina (Pax) Bocquet
- Silene argentinensis Hauman
- Silene arghireica Vals.
- Silene argillosa Munby
- Silene arguta Fenzl
- Silene aristidis Pomel
- Silene armeria Boiss. – Sweet William catchfly
- Silene arsuzensis Özbek & Uzunh.
- Silene articulata Viv.
- Silene asclepiadea Franch.
- Silene asirensis D.F.Chamb. & Collen.
- Silene assyriaca Hausskn. & Bornm. ex Lazkov
- Silene astartes Blanche ex Boiss.
- Silene astrachanicum (Pacz.) Takht.
- Silene atlantica Coss. & Durieu
- Silene atocioides Boiss.
- Silene atrocastanea Diels
- Silene atsaensis (C.Marquand) Bocquet
- Silene aucheriana Boiss.
- Silene auriculata Sm.
- Silene auriculifolia Pomel
- Silene austroiranica Rech.f., Aellen & Esfand.
- Silene avromana Boiss. & Hausskn.
- Silene ayachica Humbert
- Silene aydosensis K.Yildiz & Erik
- Silene azirensis Coode & Cullen
- Silene baccifera (L.) Durande
- Silene badachschanica Ovcz.
- Silene badaroi Breistr.
- Silene balansae Boiss.
- Silene baldshuanica B.Fedtsch.
- Silene bamianica Gilli
- Silene banksia (Meerb.) Mabb.
- Silene baranovii Ovcz. & Kurbanb.
- Silene barbara Humbert & Maire
- Silene barbeyana Heldr. ex Boiss.
- Silene barrattei Murb.
- Silene baschkirorum Janisch.
- Silene batangensis H.Limpr.
- Silene bayburtensis Hamzaoglu & Aksoy
- Silene bazardzica ourková
- Silene beguinotii Vals.
- Silene behboudiana Rech.f. & Esfand.
- Silene behen L.
- Silene bellidifolia Juss. ex Jacq.
- Silene bernardina S.Watson – Palmer's catchfly
- Silene bersieri Bocquet
- Silene berthelotiana Webb ex Christ
- Silene betpakdalensis Bajtenov
- Silene biafrae Hook.f.
- Silene biappendiculata Ehrh. ex Rohrb.
- Silene bilgilii E.Dogan & H.Duman
- Silene bilingua W.W.Sm.
- Silene birandiana Ekim
- Silene birgittae Bocquet
- Silene bitlisensis Tugay & Ertugrul
- Silene blepharicalyx Lidén
- Silene bobrovii Schischk.
- Silene bolanthoides Quézel, Contandr. & Pamukç.
- Silene borderei Jord.
- Silene boryi Boiss.
- Silene borysthenica (Gruner) Walters
- Silene bourgaei Webb ex Christ
- Silene boyd-klineana Halda, P.Gustafson & Vostrák
- Silene brahuica Boiss.
- Silene breviauriculata Ghaz.
- Silene brevicalyx Hartvig & Å.Strid
- Silene brevicaulis Boiss.
- Silene brevistaminea Gilli
- Silene bridgesii Rohrb. – Bridges' catchfly
- Silene bucharica Popov
- Silene bungei Bocquet
- Silene bupleuroides L.
- Silene burchellii Otth
- Silene burmanica Collett & Hemsl.
- Silene cabulica Bornm.
- Silene caesarea Boiss. & Balansa
- Silene caesia Sm.
- Silene caespitella F.N.Williams
- Silene calabra Brullo, Scelsi & Spamp.
- Silene caliacrae Jordanov & Panov
- Silene cambessedesii Boiss. & Reut.
- Silene campanula Pers.
- Silene campanulata S.Watson – Red Mountain catchfly
- Silene canariensis Spreng.
- Silene cancellata (Jacquem. ex Edgew. & Hook.f.) Majumdar
- Silene capillipes Boiss. & Heldr.
- Silene capitata Kom.
- Silene capitellata Boiss.
- Silene cappadocica Boiss. & Heldr.
- Silene caramanica Boiss. & Heldr.
- Silene cardiopetala Franch.
- Silene cariensis Boiss.
- Silene caroli-henrici Melzh.
- Silene caroliniana Walter – wild pink
- Silene cartilaginea Hub.-Mor.
- Silene caryophylloides (Poir.) Otth
- Silene cashmeriana (Royle ex Benth.) Majumdar
- Silene catholica (L.) W.T.Aiton
- Silene cattariniana Ferrarini & Cecchi
- Silene caucasica (Bunge) Boiss.
- Silene caudata Ovcz.
- Silene cephalantha Boiss.
- Silene cephallenia Heldr.
- Silene chaetodonta Boiss.
- Silene chaetodontoidea Parsa
- Silene chalcedonica (L.) E.H.L.Krause – flower of Bristol, Maltese cross, meadow campion
- Silene chamarensis Turcz.
- Silene chersonensis (Zapal.) Kleopow
- Silene chihuahuensis Standl.
- Silene chilensis (Naudin) Bocquet
- Silene chirensis A.Rich.
- Silene chlorantha (Willd.) Ehrh.
- Silene chlorifolia Sm.
- Silene chodatii Bocquet
- Silene choruhensis Hamzaoglu
- Silene choulettii Coss.
- Silene chubutensis (Speg.) Bocquet
- Silene chungtienensis W.W.Sm.
- Silene chustupica Nersesian
- Silene ciliata Pourr.
- Silene cinerea Desf.
- Silene cintrana Rothm.
- Silene circumcarmanica F.Jafari, Gholipour, Mirtadz. & Pourmirzaei
- Silene cirpicii K.Yildiz & Dadandi
- Silene cirtensis Pomel
- Silene citrina Boiss.
- Silene claryi Batt.
- Silene claviformis Litv.
- Silene cobalticola P.A.Duvign. & Plancke
- Silene cognata (Maxim.) H.Ohashi & H.Nakai
- Silene colorata Poir.
- Silene colpophylla Wrigley
- Silene commelinifolia Boiss.
- Silene confertiflora Chowdhuri
- Silene congesta Sm.
- Silene conglomeratica Melzh.
- Silene conica L. – sand catchfly
- Silene coniflora Nees ex Otth
- Silene conoidea L. – weed silene
- Silene cordifolia All.
- Silene coronaria (L.) Clairv. – rose campion
- Silene corrugata Ball
- Silene corylina D.F.Chamb. & Collen.
- Silene coutinhoi Rothm. & P.Silva
- Silene crassifolia L.
- Silene crassipes Fenzl
- Silene crassiuscula Brullo, C.Brullo, Cambria, Bacch., Giusso & Ilardi
- Silene cretacea Fisch. ex Spreng.
- Silene cretica L.
- Silene crispans Litv.
- Silene crispata Steven
- Silene cryptoneura Stapf
- Silene cryptopetala Hillebr.
- Silene csereii Baumg.
- Silene cuatrecasasii Pau & Font Quer
- Silene cuspidata Pedersen
- Silene cyrenaica Maire & Weiller
- Silene cyri Schischk.
- Silene cythnia (Halácsy) Walters
- Silene czopandagensis Bondarenko
- Silene daenensis Melzh.
- Silene dagestanica Rupr.
- Silene damascena Boiss. & Gaill.
- Silene damboldtiana Greuter & Melzh.
- Silene danaensis Danin
- Silene danielii Hadac
- Silene davidii (Franch.) Oxelman & Lidén
- Silene davidlongii Rajbh. & Mits.Suzuki
- Silene dawoensis H.Limpr.
- Silene degeneri Sherff
- Silene delavayi Franch.
- Silene delicatula Boiss.
- Silene demawendica Bornm.
- Silene demirizii K.Yildiz & Çirpici
- Silene denizliensis Aytaç
- Silene densiflora d'Urv.
- Silene dentipetala H.Chuang
- Silene depressa M.Bieb.
- Silene dianthoides Pers.
- Silene dichotoma Ehrh. – forked catchfly
- Silene diclinis (Lag.) M.Laínz
- Silene dieterlei Podlech
- Silene dinarica Spreng.
- Silene dioica (L.) Clairv. – red campion
- Silene dirphya Greuter & Burdet
- Silene dissecta Litard. & Maire
- Silene disticha Willd.
- Silene divaricata/Lychnis divaricata Clemente
- Silene diversifolia Otth
- Silene doganii A.Duran & Menemen
- Silene donetzica Kleopow
- Silene douglasii Hook. – Douglas' catchfly
- Silene drummondii Hook.
- Silene dschuparensis Bornm.
- Silene dumanii Kandemir, G.E.Genç & I.Genç
- Silene dumetosa C.L.Tang
- Silene duralii Bagci
- Silene dyris Maire
- Silene echegarayi (Hieron.) Bocquet
- Silene echinata Otth
- Silene echinosperma Boiss. & Heldr.
- Silene echinospermoides Hub.-Mor.
- Silene edgeworthii Bocquet
- Silene elisabethae Jan
- Silene elymaitica Bornm.
- Silene eminentis Özçelik
- Silene erciyesdaghensis – discovered on Mount Erciyes and named after it
- Silene eremitica Boiss.
- Silene eriocalycina Boiss.
- Silene ermenekensis Vural & Kit Tan
- Silene ertekinii Aydin & Oxelman
- Silene erubescens (Schischk.) Czerep.
- Silene erysimifolia Stapf
- Silene esquamata W.W.Sm.
- Silene eugeniae Kleopow
- Silene euxina (Rupr.) Hand.-Mazz.
- Silene eviscosa Bondarenko & Vved.
- Silene exaltata Friv.
- Silene fabaria (L.) Coyte
- Silene fabarioides Hausskn.
- Silene falcata Sm.
- Silene falconeriana Royle ex Benth.
- Silene farsistanica Melzh.
- Silene favargeri Bocquet
- Silene fedtschenkoana Preobr.
- Silene fedtschenkoi Bondarenko & Vved.
- Silene fenzlii Boiss. & Balansa
- Silene ferdowsii Joharchi, Nejati & F.Ghahrem.
- Silene ferganica Preobr.
- Silene fernandezii Jeanm.
- Silene fetissovii Lazkov
- Silene fetleri D.K.Pavlova
- Silene filifolia (Dusén) Bocquet
- Silene filipetala Litard. & Maire
- Silene firma Siebold & Zucc.
- Silene fissicalyx Bocquet & Chater
- Silene fissipetala Turcz.
- Silene flaccida Pau
- Silene flammulifolia Steud. ex A.Rich.
- Silene flavescens Waldst. & Kit.
- Silene flos-cuculi (L.) Greuter & Burdet – ragged robin
- Silene flos-jovis (L.) Greuter & Burdet – flower-of-Jove
- Silene foetida Link ex Spreng.
- Silene foliosa Maxim.
- Silene fraudatrix Meikle – North Cyprus catchfly
- Silene frivaldskyana Hampe
- Silene froedinii Rech.f.
- Silene fruticosa L.
- Silene fruticulosa M.Bieb.
- Silene fuscata Link ex Brot.
- Silene gaditana Talavera & Bocquet
- Silene galataea Boiss.
- Silene gallica L. – small-flowered catchfly
- Silene gallinyi Heuff. ex Rchb.
- Silene gangotriana Pusalkar, D.K.Singh & Lakshmin.
- Silene gasimailikensis B.Fedtsch.
- Silene gaubae Bornm. & Gauba
- Silene gavrilovii (Krasn.) Popov
- Silene gazulensis A.Galán, J.E.Cortés, Vicente Orell. & Mor.Alonso
- Silene gebleriana Schrenk
- Silene gemmata Meikle
- Silene genovevae Bocquet
- Silene georgievskyi Lazkov
- Silene germana J.Gay
- Silene gertraudiae Melzh.
- Silene gevasica Hamzaoglu
- Silene ghahremaninejadii Hoseini & Assadi
- Silene ghiarensis Batt.
- Silene gigantea L.
- Silene gillettii (Turrill) M.G.Gilbert
- Silene glaberrima Faure & Maire
- Silene glabrescens Coss.
- Silene goksuensis Budak, Hamzaoglu & Koç
- Silene goniocaula Boiss.
- Silene gonosperma (Rupr.) Bocquet
- Silene goulimyi Turrill
- Silene gracilenta H.Chuang
- Silene gracilicaulis C.L.Tang
- Silene gracilis DC.
- Silene gracillima Rohrb.
- Silene graeca Boiss. & Spruner
- Silene graminifolia Otth
- Silene grandiflora Franch.
- Silene grayi S.Watson – Gray's catchfly
- Silene × grecescui Gusul.
- Silene greenei (S.Watson ex B.L.Rob.) Howell
- Silene greywilsonii Rajbh. & Mits.Suzuki
- Silene grisea Boiss.
- Silene grisebachii (Davidov) Pirker & Greuter
- Silene grossheimii Schischk.
- Silene gubanovii Lazkov
- Silene guerbuezii Özçelik
- Silene guichardii Chevassut & Quézel
- Silene guinetii Quézel
- Silene guntensis (B.Fedtsch.) B.Fedtsch. ex Schischk.
- Silene gynodioica Ghaz.
- Silene habaensis H.Chuang
- Silene × hampeana Meusel & K.Werner
- Silene hamzaoglui Budak
- Silene haradjianii Chowdhuri
- Silene haumanii Bocquet
- Silene haussknechtii Heldr. ex Hausskn.
- Silene hawaiiensis Sherff – Hawaii catchfly
- Silene hayekiana Hand.-Mazz. & Janch.
- Silene heldreichii Boiss.
- Silene helleboriflora Exell & Bocquet
- Silene hellmannii Claus
- Silene helmandica Podlech
- Silene herbilegorum (Bocquet) Lidén & Oxelman
- Silene heterodonta F.N.Williams
- Silene heuffelii Soó
- Silene hicesiae Brullo & Signor.
- Silene hidaka-alpina (Miyabe & Tatew.) Ohwi & H.Ohashi
- Silene hideakiohbae Rajbh. & Mits.Suzuki
- Silene hifacensis Rouy ex Willk.
- Silene himalayensis (Rohrb.) Majumdar
- Silene hirticalyx Boiss. & Hausskn.
- Silene hitchguirei Bocquet
- Silene hoefftiana Fisch. & C.A.Mey.
- Silene holosteifolia Bocquet & Chater
- Silene holzmannii Heldr. ex Boiss.
- Silene hookeri Nutt. – Hooker's silene
- Silene horvati – Horvats's catchfly
- Silene huguettiae Bocquet
- Silene humilis C.A.Mey.
- Silene huochenensis X.M.Pi & X.L.Pan
- Silene hupehensis C.L.Tang
- Silene hussonii Boiss.
- Silene ibosii Emb. & Maire
- Silene ichnusae Brullo, De Marco & De Marco f.
- Silene ikonnikovii Lazkov
- Silene imbricata Desf.
- Silene inaperta L.
- Silene incisa C.L.Tang
- Silene inclinata Hub.-Mor.
- Silene incurvifolia Kar. & Kir.
- Silene indeprensa Schischk.
- Silene indica Roxb. ex Otth
- Silene insularis Barbey
- Silene integripetala Bory & Chaub.
- Silene × intermedia (Lange) Bocquet
- Silene intramongolica Lazkov
- Silene intricata Post
- Silene invisa C.L.Hitchc. & Maguire – red fir catchfly
- Silene involucrata (Cham. & Schltdl.) Bocquet
- Silene ionica Halácsy
- Silene × isabeliae P.P.Ferrer, Ferrando & E.Laguna
- Silene isaurica Contandr. & Quézel
- Silene ispartensis Ghaz.
- Silene italica (L.) Pers. – Italian catchfly
- Silene jailensis N.I.Rubtzov
- Silene jaxartica Pavlov
- Silene jeniseensis Willd.
- Silene joerstadii Wendelbo
- Silene jugora (F.N.Williams) Majumdar
- Silene julaensis Grierson
- Silene karaczukuri B.Fedtsch.
- Silene karekirii Bocquet
- Silene keiskei Miq.
- Silene kemahensis Aytaç & Kandemir
- Silene kemoniana C.Brullo, Brullo, Giusso, Ilardi & Sciandr.
- Silene kermanensis Bornm.
- Silene khasiana Rohrb.
- Silene kialensis (F.N.Williams) Lidén & Oxelman
- Silene kingii (S.Watson) Bocquet
- Silene kirgisensis Bajtenov & Nelina
- Silene kiusiana (Makino) H.Ohashi & H.Nakai
- Silene klokovii Knjaz.
- Silene koelzii Rech.f.
- Silene konuralpii Firat & K.Yildiz
- Silene koreana Kom. – sticky catchfly
- Silene korshinskyi Schischk.
- Silene koycegizensis Dönmez & Vural
- Silene krantzii Stoughton
- Silene kremeri Soy.-Will. & Godr.
- Silene kubanensis Sommier & Levier
- Silene kucukodukii Bagci & Uysal
- Silene kudrjaschevii Schischk.
- Silene kulabensis B.Fedtsch.
- Silene kumaonensis F.N.Williams
- Silene kunawarensis Royle ex Benth.
- Silene kungessana B.Fedtsch.
- Silene kuschakewiczii Regel & Schmalh.
- Silene lacera (Steven) Sims
- Silene laciniata Cav.
- Silene laconica Boiss. & Orph.
- Silene ladyginae Lazkov
- Silene laevigata Sm. – Troödos catchfly
- Silene lagenocalyx Fenzl ex Boiss.
- Silene lagunensis C.Sm. ex Link
- Silene lamarum C.Y.Wu
- Silene lanceolata A.Gray – Kauai catchfly
- Silene lanuginosa Bertol.
- Silene lasiantha K.Koch
- Silene latifolia Poir. – white campion
- Silene laxa Boiss. & Kotschy
- Silene laxantha Majumdar
- Silene lazica Boiss.
- Silene legionensis Lag.
- Silene lemmonii S.Watson – Lemmon's catchfly
- Silene lenkoranica Lazkov
- Silene leptoclada Boiss.
- Silene leucophylla Boiss.
- Silene lhassana (F.N.Williams) Majumdar
- Silene libanotica Boiss.
- Silene lichiangensis W.W.Sm.
- Silene linae Bocquet
- Silene linearifolia Otth
- Silene lineariloba C.Y.Wu
- Silene linearis Decne.
- Silene linicola C.C.Gmel. – flaxfield catchfly
- Silene linoides Otth
- Silene lipskyi Lazkov
- Silene lithophila Kar. & Kir.
- Silene littorea Brot.
- Silene litwinowii Schischk.
- Silene lomalasinensis (Engl.) T.Harris & Goyder
- Silene longicalycina Kom.
- Silene longicarpophora (Kom.) Bocquet
- Silene longicilia (Brot.) Otth
- Silene longicornuta C.Y.Wu & C.L.Tang
- Silene longidens Schischk.
- Silene longipetala Vent.
- Silene longisepala Nasir
- Silene lucida Chowdhuri
- Silene luciliae Bocquet
- Silene lycaonica Chowdhuri
- Silene lychnidea C.A.Mey.
- Silene lydia Boiss.
- Silene lynesii C.Norman
- Silene macrodonta Boiss.
- Silene macrosolen Steud. ex A.Rich.
- Silene macrostyla Maxim.
- Silene maeotica (Klokov) Czerep.
- Silene magellanica (Desr.) Bocquet
- Silene magenta Yild. & Kiliç
- Silene makmeliana Boiss.
- Silene mandonii (Rohrb.) Bocquet
- Silene manissadjianii Freyn
- Silene marcowiczii Schischk.
- Silene margaritae Bocquet
- Silene marizii Samp.
- Silene markamensis L.H.Zhou
- Silene marmarica Bég. & A.Vacc.
- Silene marmorensis Kruckeb. – Marble Mountain catchfly
- Silene marschallii C.A.Mey.
- Silene martinolii Bocchieri & Mulas
- Silene martyi Emb. & Maire
- Silene maurorum Batt. & Pit.
- Silene media (Litv.) Kleopow
- Silene megalantha Bondarenko & Vved.
- Silene mekinensis Coss.
- Silene melanantha Franch.
- Silene melanopotamica Pedersen
- Silene melikjanii Taisumov & Teimurov
- Silene melitensis Brullo, C.Brullo, Cambria, Lanfr., S.Lanfr., Miniss., Sciand
- Silene mellifera Boiss. & Reut.
- Silene melzheimeri Greuter
- Silene mentagensis Coss.
- Silene menziesii Hook. – Menzies' campion
- Silene mesatlantica Maire
- Silene meyeri Fenzl ex Boiss. & Buhse
- Silene michelsonii Preobr.
- Silene micropetala Lag.
- Silene microphylla Boiss.
- Silene microsperma Fenzl
- Silene miksensis Firat & K.Yildiz
- Silene minae Strobl
- Silene miqueliana (Rohrb.) H.Ohashi & H.Nakai
- Silene mirei Chevassut & Quézel
- Silene mishudaghensis Gholipour & Parsa Khanghah
- Silene modesta Boiss. & Blanche
- Silene mollissima (L.) Pers.
- Silene monbeigii W.W.Sm.
- Silene monerantha F.N.Williams
- Silene mongolica Maxim.
- Silene montbretiana Boiss.
- Silene × montistellensis Ladero
- Silene moorcroftiana Benth.
- Silene morganae Freyn
- Silene morisiana Bég. & Ravenel
- Silene morrisonmontana (Hayata) Ohwi & H.Ohashi
- Silene muliensis C.Y.Wu
- Silene multicaulis Guss.
- Silene multiflora (Ehrh.) Pers.
- Silene multifurcata C.L.Tang
- Silene multinervia S.Watson – manynerve catchfly
- Silene mundiana Eckl. & Zeyh.
- Silene muradica Schischk.
- Silene muschleri Bocquet
- Silene muscipula L.
- Silene muslimii Pavlov
- Silene mutabilis L.
- Silene myongcheonensis S.P.Hong & H.K.Moon
- Silene nachlingerae A.Tiehm
- Silene namlaensis (C.Marquand) Bocquet
- Silene nana Kar. & Kir.
- Silene nangqenensis C.L.Tang
- Silene napuligera Franch.
- Silene natalii F.O.Khass. & I.I.Malzev
- Silene nefelites C.Brullo, Brullo, Giusso & Ilardi
- Silene nemoralis Waldst. & Kit.
- Silene nemrutensis K.Yildiz
- Silene neoladyginae Lazkov
- Silene nepalensis Majumdar
- Silene nerimaniae G.E.Genç, Kandemir & I.Genç
- Silene nevskii Schischk.
- Silene nicaeensis All.
- Silene niederi Heldr.
- Silene nigrescens (Edgew.) Majumdar
- Silene ningxiaensis C.L.Tang
- Silene nivalis (Kit.) Rohrb.
- Silene nivea (Nutt.) Muhl. ex DC.
- Silene nizvana Melzh.
- Silene nocteolens Webb & Berthel.
- Silene noctiflora L. – night-flowering catchfly
- Silene nocturna L.
- Silene nodulosa Viv.
- Silene notarisii Ces.
- Silene novorossica Doweld
- Silene nuda (S.Watson) C.L.Hitchc. & Maguire – western fringed catchfly
- Silene nummica Vals.
- Silene nuncupanda Coode & Cullen
- Silene nuratavica Kamelin
- Silene nurensis Boiss. & Hausskn.
- Silene nutabunda Greuter
- Silene nutans L. – Nottingham catchfly
- Silene oblanceolata W.W.Sm.
- Silene obovata Schischk.
- Silene obscura Vorosch.
- Silene obtusidentata B.Fedtsch. & Popov
- Silene obtusifolia Willd.
- Silene occidentalis S.Watson – western catchfly
- Silene odontopetala Fenzl
- Silene odoratissima Bunge
- Silene oenotriae Brullo
- Silene olgae (Maxim.) Rohrb.
- Silene oligantha Boiss. & Heldr.
- Silene oligophylla Melzh.
- Silene oligotricha Hub.-Mor.
- Silene oliveriana Otth
- Silene olympica Boiss.
- Silene orbelica Greuter
- Silene oreades Boiss. & Heldr.
- Silene oregana S.Watson – Oregon silene
- Silene oreina Schischk.
- Silene oreophila Boiss.
- Silene oreosinaica Chowdhuri
- Silene orientalimongolica Kozhevn.
- Silene orientoalborzensis F.Jafari & Mirtadz.
- Silene ornata Aiton
- Silene oropediorum Coss.
- Silene orphanidis Boiss.
- Silene otites (L.) Wibel – Spanish catchfly
- Silene otodonta Franch.
- Silene ovalifolia (Regel & Schmalh.) Popov
- Silene ovata Pursh – ovate-leaved catchfly
- Silene oxelmanii Gholipour
- Silene oxyodonta Barbey
- Silene ozyurtii Aksoy & Hamzaoglu
- Silene paeoniensis Bornm. – Paeonian catchfly
- Silene paghmanica Gilli
- Silene pakistanica Lazkov
- Silene paktiensis Podlech & Melzh.
- Silene palaestina Boiss.
- Silene palinotricha Fenzl ex Boiss.
- Silene paphlagonica Bornm.
- Silene papillosa Boiss.
- Silene paradoxa L.
- Silene paranadena Bondarenko & Vved.
- Silene parishii S.Watson – Parish's catchfly
- Silene parjumanensis Podlech
- Silene parnassica Boiss. & Spruner
- Silene parrowiana Boiss. & Hausskn.
- Silene parryi (S.Watson) C.L.Hitchc. & Maguire
- Silene patagonica (Speg.) Bocquet
- Silene patula Desf.
- Silene peduncularis Boiss.
- Silene peloritana C.Brullo, Brullo, Giusso, Miniss. & Sciandr.
- Silene pendula L.
- Silene pentelica Boiss.
- Silene perlmanii W.L.Wagner, D.R.Herbst & Sohmer – cliff-face catchfly
- Silene persepolitana Melzh.
- Silene persica Boiss.
- Silene petersonii Maguire
- Silene petrarchae Ferrarini & Cecchi
- Silene pharnaceifolia Fenzl
- Silene phoenicodonta Franch.
- Silene phrygia Boiss.
- Silene physalodes Boiss.
- Silene physocalycina (Hausskn. & Bornm.) Melzh.
- Silene pichiana Ferrarini & Cecchi
- Silene pinetorum Boiss. & Heldr.
- Silene plankii C.L.Hitchc. & Maguire
- Silene platyphylla Franch.
- Silene plurifolia Schischk.
- Silene plutonica Naudin ex Gay
- Silene poa Lidén
- Silene pogonocalyx (Svent.) Bramwell
- Silene polypetala (Walter) Fernald & B.G.Schub. – eastern fringed catchfly
- Silene pomelii Batt.
- Silene pompeiopolitana J.Gay ex Boiss.
- Silene popovii Schischk.
- Silene porandica Gilli
- Silene portensis L.
- Silene praelonga Ovcz.
- Silene praemixta Popov
- Silene pravitziana Rech.f.
- Silene prilepensis Micevski – Prilep catchfly
- Silene prilipkoana Schischk.
- Silene principis Oxelman & Lidén
- Silene procera Lidén
- Silene procumbens Murray
- Silene pruinosa Boiss.
- Silene psammitis Link ex Spreng.
- Silene pseudaucheriana Melzh.
- Silene pseudoatocion Desf.
- Silene pseudobehen Boiss.
- Silene pseudocashmeriana Bocquet & Chater
- Silene pseudofortunei H.P.Tsui & C.L.Tang
- Silene pseudoholopetala Lazkov
- Silene pseudonurensis Melzh.
- Silene × pseudotites Besser ex Rchb.
- Silene pseudoverticillata Nasir
- Silene pseudovestita Batt.
- Silene pterosperma Maxim.
- Silene pubicalycina C.Y.Wu
- Silene pubicalyx Bondarenko & Vved.
- Silene pugionifolia Popov
- Silene pungens Boiss.
- Silene puranensis (L.H.Zhou) C.Y.Wu & H.Chuang
- Silene purii Bocquet & N.P.Saxena
- Silene pygmaea Adams
- Silene qiyunshanensis X.H.Guo & X.L.Liu
- Silene quadriloba Turcz. ex Kar. & Kir.
- Silene radicosa Boiss. & Heldr.
- Silene ramosissima Desf.
- Silene rasvandica Melzh.
- Silene rechingeri Bocquet
- Silene rectiramea B.L.Rob.
- Silene regia Sims – royal catchfly, showy catchfly
- Silene reichenbachii Vis.
- Silene reinholdii Heldr.
- Silene reiseri K.Malý
- Silene renzii Melzh.
- Silene repens Patrin
- Silene requienii Otth
- Silene reticulata Desf.
- Silene retinervis Ghaz.
- Silene reverchonii Batt.
- Silene rhiphaena Pau & Font Quer
- Silene rhizophora (Muschl.) Bocquet
- Silene rhynchocarpa Boiss.
- Silene rigens Goldblatt & J.C.Manning
- Silene roemeri Friv.
- Silene roopiana Kleopow
- Silene rosiflora Kingdon-Ward ex W.W.Sm.
- Silene rosulata Soy.-Will. & Godr.
- Silene rothmaleri P.Silva
- Silene rotundifolia Nutt. – roundleaf catchfly
- Silene rouyana Batt.
- Silene rubella L.
- Silene rubricalyx (C.Marquand) Bocquet
- Silene ruinarum Popov
- Silene ruprechtii Schischk.
- Silene sabinosae Pit.
- Silene sachalinensis F.Schmidt
- Silene salamandra Pamp.
- Silene salangensis Melzh.
- Silene saldanhensis Goldblatt & J.C.Manning
- Silene salicifolia C.L.Tang
- Silene salmonacea T.W.Nelson, J.P.Nelson & S.A.Erwin – Klamath Mountain catchfly
- Silene salsuginea Hub.-Mor.
- Silene samarkandensis Preobr.
- Silene samia Melzh. & Christod.
- Silene samojedorum (Sambuk) Oxelman
- Silene samothracica (Rech.f.) Greuter
- Silene sangaria Coode & Cullen
- Silene sarawschanica Regel & Schmalh.
- Silene sargentii S.Watson – Sargent's catchfly
- Silene sartorii Boiss. & Heldr.
- Silene saxatilis Sims
- Silene saxifraga L.
- Silene scabrida Soy.-Will. & Godr.
- Silene scabriflora Brot.
- Silene scaposa S.Watson
- Silene schafta J.G.Gmel. ex Hohen. – autumn catchfly
- Silene schimperiana Boiss.
- Silene schischkinii (Popov) Vved.
- Silene schizopetala Bornm.
- Silene schlumbergeri Boiss.
- Silene schmuckeri Wettst.
- Silene schugnanica B.Fedtsch.
- Silene schwarzenbergeri Halácsy
- Silene sciaphila Melzh. & Rech.f.
- Silene sclerocarpa Dufour
- Silene sclerophylla Chowdhuri
- Silene scoparia Lidén
- Silene scopulorum Franch.
- Silene scouleri Hook. – simple campion
- Silene secundiflora Otth
- Silene sedoides Poir.
- Silene seelyi C.V.Morton & J.W.Thomps.
- Silene sefidiana (Pau) Greuter & Burdet
- Silene semenovii Regel & Herder
- Silene sendtneri Boiss.
- Silene sennenii Pau
- Silene seoulensis Nakai
- Silene sericea All.
- Silene serpentinicola T.W.Nelson & J.P.Nelson – serpentine Indian pink
- Silene sessionis Batt.
- Silene setaesperma Majumdar
- Silene shahrudensis Rech.f.
- Silene shanbashakensis Rech.f.
- Silene shehbazii S.A.Ahmad
- Silene sibirica (L.) Pers.
- Silene siderophila Boiss. & Gaill.
- Silene sieberi Fenzl
- Silene simsii F.Jafari, Rabeler & Oxelman
- Silene sisianica Boiss. & Buhse
- Silene skorpilii Velen.
- Silene sojakii Melzh.
- Silene solenantha Trautv.
- Silene songarica (Fisch., C.A.Mey. & Avé-Lall.) Bocquet
- Silene sordida Hub.-Mor. & Reese
- Silene sorensenis (B.Boivin) Bocquet – Sorensen's catchfly
- Silene spaldingii S.Watson – Spalding's silene
- Silene spergulifolia (Willd.) M.Bieb.
- Silene spinescens Sm.
- Silene splendens Boiss.
- Silene squamigera Boiss.
- Silene staintonii Ghaz.
- Silene stapfii Melzh.
- Silene stellariifolia Bocquet & Chater
- Silene stellata (L.) Coyte – starry campion
- Silene stenantha Ovcz.
- Silene stenobotrys Boiss. & Hausskn.
- Silene stenophylla Ledeb. – narrow-leafed campion
- Silene stewartiana Diels
- Silene stewartii (Edgew.) Majumdar
- Silene stockenii Chater
- Silene stracheyi Edgew.
- Silene striata Ehrenb. ex Rohrb.
- Silene stricta L.
- Silene struthioloides A.Gray
- Silene stylosa Bunge
- Silene suaveolens Kar. & Kir.
- Silene subadenophora Ovcz.
- Silene subciliata B.L.Rob.
- Silene subconica Friv.
- Silene subcretacea F.N.Williams
- Silene subodhii S.R.Kundu
- Silene succulenta Forssk.
- Silene suecica
- Silene suksdorfii B.L.Rob. – Suksdorf's silene
- Silene sumbuliana Deniz & O.D.Dü?en
- Silene sunhangii D.G.Zhang, T.Deng & N.Lin
- Silene supina M.Bieb.
- Silene surculosa Hub.-Mor.
- Silene surobica Gilli
- Silene sussamyrica Lazkov
- Silene sveae Lidén & Oxelman
- Silene swertiifolia Boiss.
- Silene syngei (Turrill) T.Harris & Goyder
- Silene sytnikii Krytzka, Novosad & Protop.
- Silene tachtensis Franch.
- Silene taimyrensis (Tolm.) Bocquet – Taymyr catchfly
- Silene takeshimensis Uyeki & Sakata
- Silene taliewii Kleopow
- Silene talyschensis Schischk.
- Silene tamaranae Bramwell
- Silene tatarica (L.) Pers.
- Silene tatarinowii Regel
- Silene taygetea Halácsy
- Silene telavivensis Zohary & Plitmann
- Silene tenella C.A.Mey.
- Silene tenuiflora Guss.
- Silene thurberi S.Watson
- Silene thymifolia Sm.
- Silene thysanodes Fenzl
- Silene tibetica Lidén & Oxelman
- Silene tokachiensis Kadota
- Silene tolmatchevii Bocquet
- Silene tomentella Schischk.
- Silene tomentosa Otth
- Silene toussidana Quézel
- Silene trachyphylla Franch.
- Silene tragacantha Fenzl ex Boiss.
- Silene trajectorum Kom.
- Silene tridentata Desf.
- Silene triflora (Bornm.) Bornm.
- Silene tuberculata (Ball) Maire & Weiller
- Silene tubiformis C.L.Tang
- Silene tubulosa Oxelman & Lidén
- Silene tunetana Murb.
- Silene tunicoides Boiss.
- Silene turbinata Guss.
- Silene turczaninovii Lazkov
- Silene turgida M.Bieb. ex Bunge
- Silene turkestanica Regel
- Silene undulata Aiton – large-flowered catchfly, gunpowder plant, wild tobacco
- Silene ungeri Fenzl
- Silene uniflora Roth – sea campion
- Silene uralensis (Rupr.) Bocquet
- Silene × urbanica Panov
- Silene urodonta Bornm.
- Silene urvillei Schott ex d'Urv.
- Silene vachschii Ovcz.
- Silene vagans C.B.Clarke
- Silene vaginans Lidén
- Silene vallesia L.
- Silene valsecchiae Bocchieri
- Silene variegata (Desf.) Boiss. & Heldr.
- Silene vautierae Bocquet
- Silene velcevii Jordanov & Panov
- Silene velebitica (Degen) Wrigley
- Silene velutina Pourr. ex Loisel.
- Silene velutinoides Pomel
- Silene ventricosa Adamovic
- Silene verecunda S.Watson – San Francisco campion
- Silene vidaliana Pau & Font Quer
- Silene villosa Forssk.
- Silene villosula (Trautv.) V.V.Petrovsky & Elven
- Silene violascens (Tolm.) V.V.Petrovsky & Elven
- Silene virescens Coss.
- Silene virgata Stapf
- Silene virginica L. – fire pink
- Silene viridiflora L.
- Silene viscaria – sticky catchfly
- Silene viscariopsis Bornm. – Mariovo catchfly
- Silene viscidula Franch.
- Silene viscosa (L.) Pers. – white sticky catchfly
- Silene vivianii Steud.
- Silene volubilitana Braun-Blanq. & Maire
- Silene vulgaris (Moench) Garcke – bladder campion
- Silene wahlbergella Chowdhuri – northern catchfly
- Silene waldsteinii Griseb.
- Silene wardii (C.Marquand) Bocquet
- Silene weberbaueri (Muschl.) Bocquet
- Silene wendelboi Assadi
- Silene wilfordii (Regel) H.Ohashi & H.Nakai
- Silene williamsii Britton
- Silene wolgensis (Hornem.) Otth
- Silene wrightii A.Gray
- Silene yarmalii Podlech
- Silene yemensis Deflers
- Silene yetii Bocquet
- Silene yildirimlii Dinç
- Silene yunnanensis Franch.
- Silene zangezura Elenevsky
- Silene zawadzkii Herbich
- Silene zayuensis L.H.Zhou
- Silene zhongbaensis (L.H.Zhou) C.Y.Wu & C.L.Tang
- Silene zhoui C.Y.Wu
- Silene zuntoreica Zuev
