= Silene sessionis =

Scientific classification
- Kingdom: Plantae
- Clade: Tracheophytes
- Clade: Angiosperms
- Clade: Eudicots
- Order: Caryophyllales
- Family: Caryophyllaceae
- Genus: Silene
- Species: S. sessionis

Binomial name
- Silene sessionis Batt.

Species of plant

Silene sessionis is a species of plant in the family Caryophyllaceae.

It is native to Algeria. Where it is endemic to coastal sea cliffs.

The IUCN lists the species as endangered.
