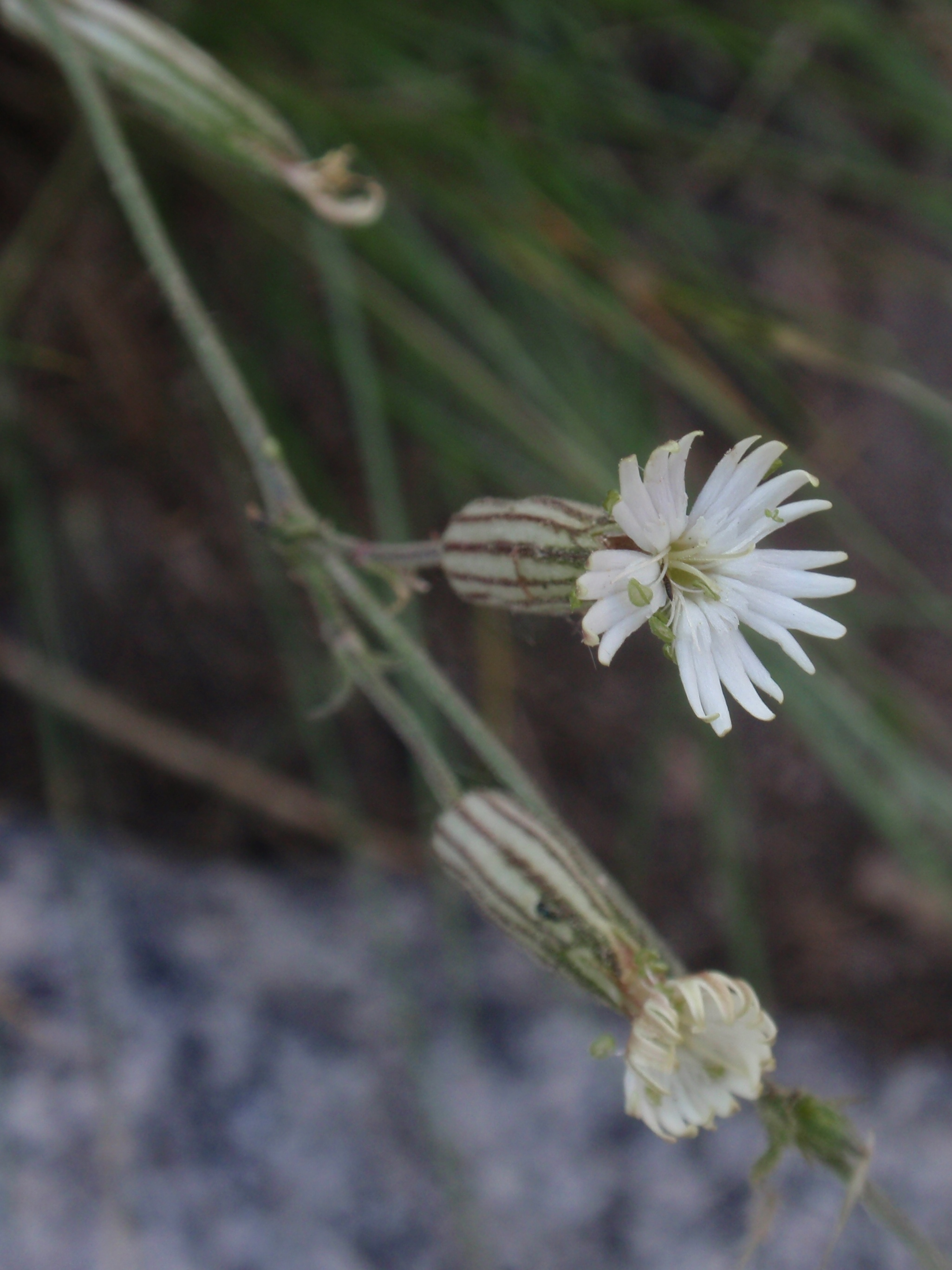

Scientific classification
- Kingdom: Plantae
- Clade: Tracheophytes
- Clade: Angiosperms
- Clade: Eudicots
- Order: Caryophyllales
- Family: Caryophyllaceae
- Genus: Silene
- Species: S. bernardina

Binomial name
- Silene bernardina S.Watson

= Silene bernardina =

Palmer's catchfly

Species of flowering plant

Silene bernardina is a species of flowering plant in the family Caryophyllaceae known by the common name Palmer's catchfly.

It is native to western North America.

== Description ==
Silene bernardina is a variable plant and is divided into several subspecies. In general, it is a perennial herb growing from a taproot and leafy caudex unit, the hairy, erect stems growing up to about .5 metres (1 1/2 feet) tall. The slender stems have glandular, sticky patches on their upper parts. The linear or lance-shaped leaves are up to 8 centimetres (3 inches) long low on the stem and smaller on the distal branches.

Flowers occur in a terminal cyme at the top of the stem, as well as in some of the leaf axils. Each has a hairy, glandular calyx of fused sepals with ten red veins. The calyx is open at the top, revealing five white or purple-pink petals which may be almost 3 cm (1 1/4 in) long. The petals have usually four fringelike lobes at the tips and feathery appendages at their bases. The stamens and three or four long styles protrude from the flower's center.

== Distribution and habitat ==
It is native to western North America from Washington and Idaho, through California and Oregon, to Baja California. It grows in several types of habitat, including chaparral scrub, mountain forests, and higher-elevation habitats in alpine climates.
