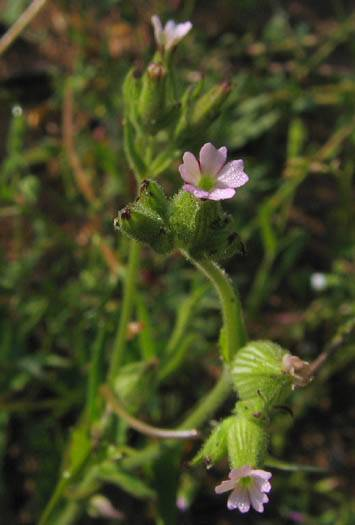

Scientific classification
- Kingdom: Plantae
- Clade: Tracheophytes
- Clade: Angiosperms
- Clade: Eudicots
- Order: Caryophyllales
- Family: Caryophyllaceae
- Genus: Silene
- Species: S. multinervia

Binomial name
- Silene multinervia S.Watson

= Silene multinervia =

Species of flowering plant

Silene multinervia is a species of flowering plant in the family Caryophyllaceae known by the common name manynerve catchfly.

It is native to the coastal hills and mountain ranges of California and Baja California, where it grows in chaparral and other local habitat.

Silene multinervia is an annual herb producing a hairy, glandular, upright stem to a maximum height near 65 centimetres (26 in). The leaves are lance-shaped and up to 10 centimetres (3.9 in) long; the largest ones are low on the stem and smaller ones higher up. Flowers occur in a terminal cyme at the top of the stem, as well as in some of the leaf axils. Each is encapsulated in a hairy calyx of fused sepals which is lined with many veins, more than the ten that many other Silene have. The five petals are white to pink and have small notches in their tips.

Like many chaparral plants, this species is adapted to wildfire-prone conditions. Its seeds are strongly stimulated to germinate when exposed to smoke.
