= Silene disticha =

Scientific classification
- Kingdom: Plantae
- Clade: Tracheophytes
- Clade: Angiosperms
- Clade: Eudicots
- Order: Caryophyllales
- Family: Caryophyllaceae
- Genus: Silene
- Species: S. disticha

Binomial name
- Silene disticha Willd.

Synonyms
- Silene chlorantha Fenzl; Silene coarctata Fenzl; Silene congesta Fenzl; Silene hirsuta Schousb. ex Ball; Silene hispida Willd.; Silene micropetala Roem. ex Schrank; Silene mutica Fenzl; Silene parvifolia Otth

Species of flowering plant

Silene disticha is a species of flowering plant in the family Caryophyllaceae. The species is hermaphroditic and mainly grows in the subtropics.

It is native to Algeria, Morocco, Portugal, Spain, and Tunisia. The species was introduced to the island of Corsica in 1967.
