= Silene sytnikii =

Scientific classification
- Kingdom: Plantae
- Clade: Tracheophytes
- Clade: Angiosperms
- Clade: Eudicots
- Order: Caryophyllales
- Family: Caryophyllaceae
- Genus: Silene
- Species: S. sytnikii

Binomial name
- Silene sytnikii Krytzka, Novosad & Protop.

Species of plant in the carnation family

Silene sytnikii is a species of flowering plant in the family Caryophyllaceae, native to Ukraine. Known from only a few locales along the Southern Bug river, it is very similar to Silene frivaldskyana.
