= Silene yunnanensis =

Scientific classification
- Kingdom: Plantae
- Clade: Tracheophytes
- Clade: Angiosperms
- Clade: Eudicots
- Order: Caryophyllales
- Family: Caryophyllaceae
- Genus: Silene
- Species: S. yunnanensis

Binomial name
- Silene yunnanensis Franch.

Species of plant

Silene yunnanensis is a plant species native to central southern parts of China. It goes by the common name Chinese catchfly.
