= Silene fernandezii =

Conservation status
- Endangered (IUCN 3.1)

Scientific classification
- Kingdom: Plantae
- Clade: Tracheophytes
- Clade: Angiosperms
- Clade: Eudicots
- Order: Caryophyllales
- Family: Caryophyllaceae
- Genus: Silene
- Species: S. fernandezii

Binomial name
- Silene fernandezii Jeanm.

Species of flowering plant

Silene fernandezii is a species of plant in the family Caryophyllaceae. It is endemic to Spain. Its natural habitat is rocky areas. It is threatened by habitat loss.
