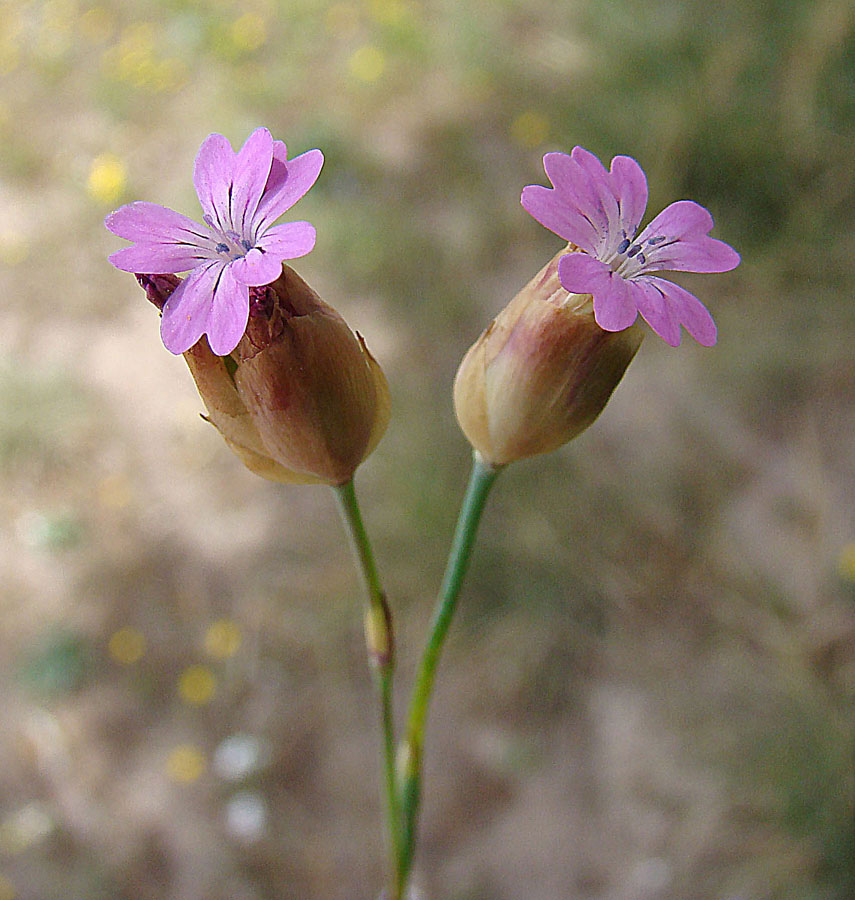

Scientific classification
- Kingdom: Plantae
- Clade: Tracheophytes
- Clade: Angiosperms
- Clade: Eudicots
- Order: Caryophyllales
- Family: Caryophyllaceae
- Genus: Silene
- Species: S. mandonii

Binomial name
- Silene mandonii (Rohrb.) Bocquet

Synonyms
- Melandrium hieronymi Pax; Melandrium mandonii Rohrb.; Melandrium rimbachii Mattf.

= Silene mandonii =

Species of flowering plant

Silene mandonii is a species of flowering plant in the family Caryophyllaceae.

The species is native to Argentina, Bolivia, Chile, Ecuador, and Peru.
