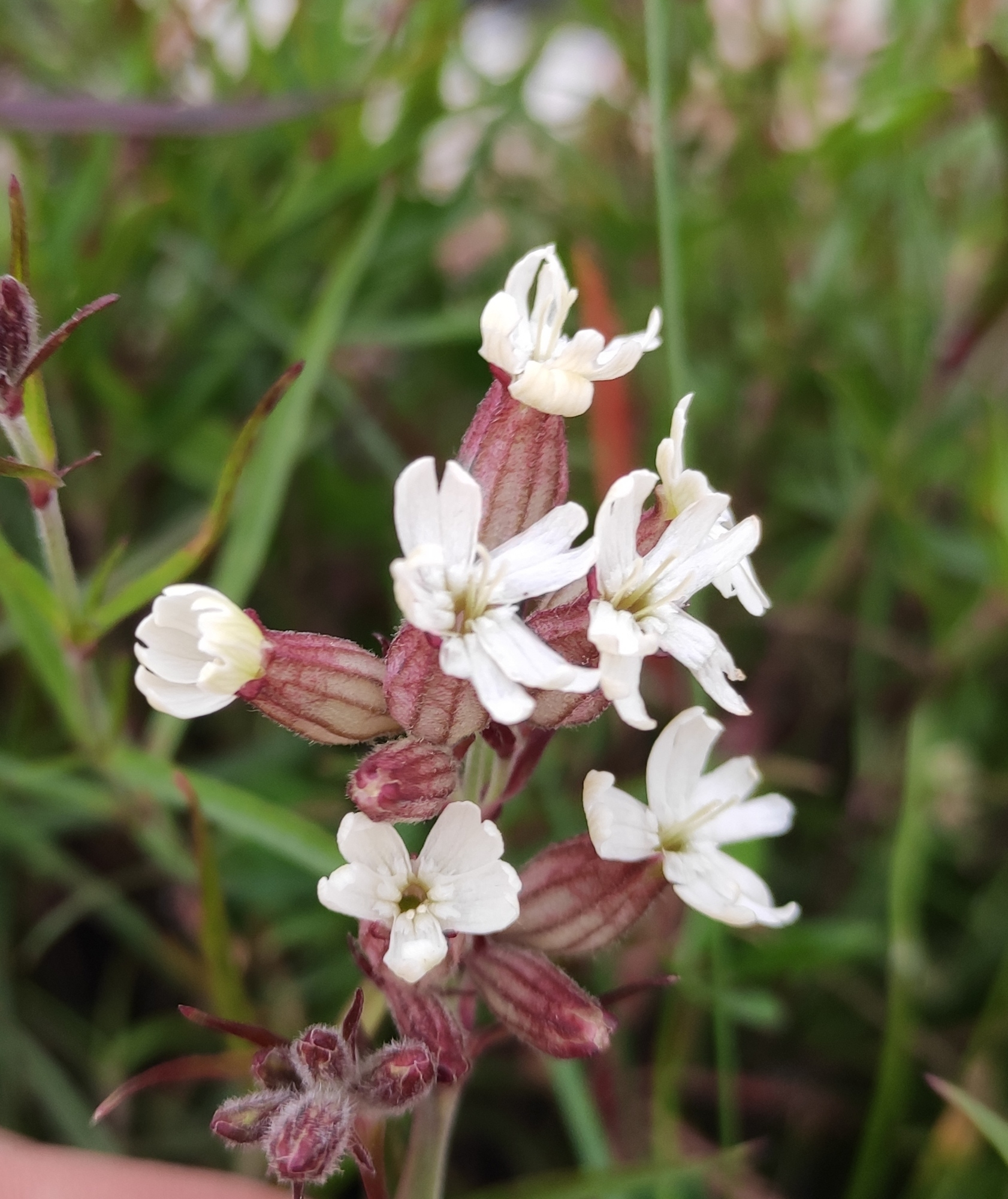
- Close-up of flowers
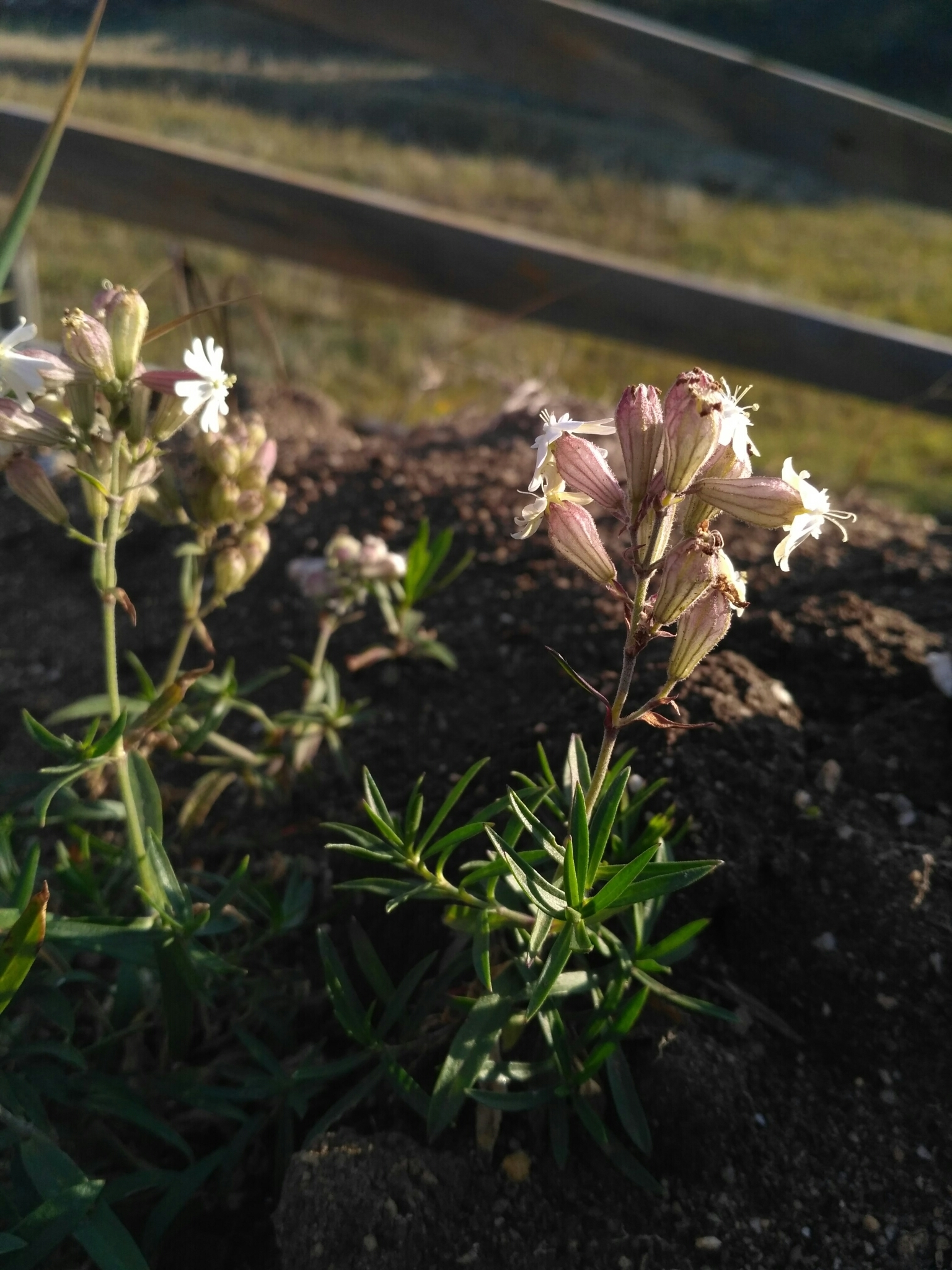
- Habit

Scientific classification
- Kingdom: Plantae
- Clade: Tracheophytes
- Clade: Angiosperms
- Clade: Eudicots
- Order: Caryophyllales
- Family: Caryophyllaceae
- Genus: Silene
- Species: S. amoena

Binomial name
- Silene amoena L.

Synonyms
- List: Cucubalus dauricus Pall. ex Bunge; Cucubalus sibiricus Willd. ex Walp.; Cucubalus staticifolius Poir.; Silene amoena subsp. igoschinae Tzvelev; Silene baicalensis Turcz.; Silene graminifolia var. subglabra Regel & Tiling; Silene graminifolia lusus subglabra Regel; Silene graminifolia lusus tenuis (Willd.) Regel; Silene graminifolia var. tenuis (Willd.) Regel & Tiling; Silene graminifolia f. tenuis (Willd.) Regel; Silene jenisea var. latifolia Turcz.; Silene jeniseensis f. latifolia (Turcz.) Schischk.; Silene jeniseensis var. latifolia (Turcz.) Y.Z.Zhao; Silene repens Boiss.; Silene sajanensis Less. ex Ledeb.; Silene tenuifolia Otth; Silene tenuis Willd.; Silene viscaginoides Hornem.

= Silene amoena =

Species of plant

Silene amoena is a species of flowering plant in the family Caryophyllaceae, native to European Russia, Siberia, Central Asia, the western Himalayas, and Mongolia. A perennial, it is typically found in the subalpine or subarctic biomes. It has been characterized as either a diploid or a tetraploid and is a far eastern representative of section Auriculatae.
