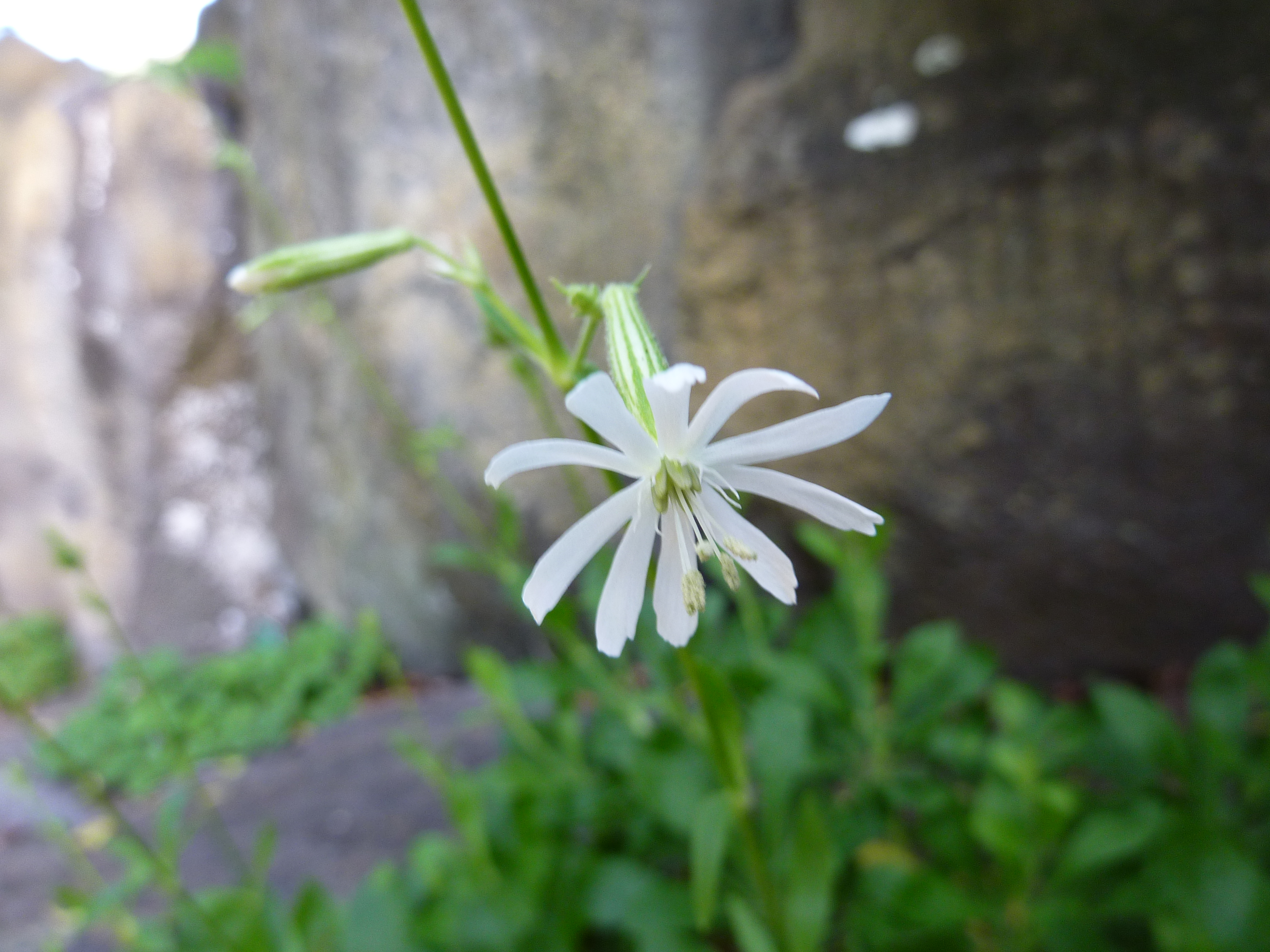

Scientific classification
- Kingdom: Plantae
- Clade: Tracheophytes
- Clade: Angiosperms
- Clade: Eudicots
- Order: Caryophyllales
- Family: Caryophyllaceae
- Genus: Silene
- Species: S. tamaranae

Binomial name
- Silene tamaranae Bramwell

= Silene tamaranae =

Species of plant

Silene tamaranae is a species of plant in the Caryophyllaceae family.

The species is native to the Canary Islands.
