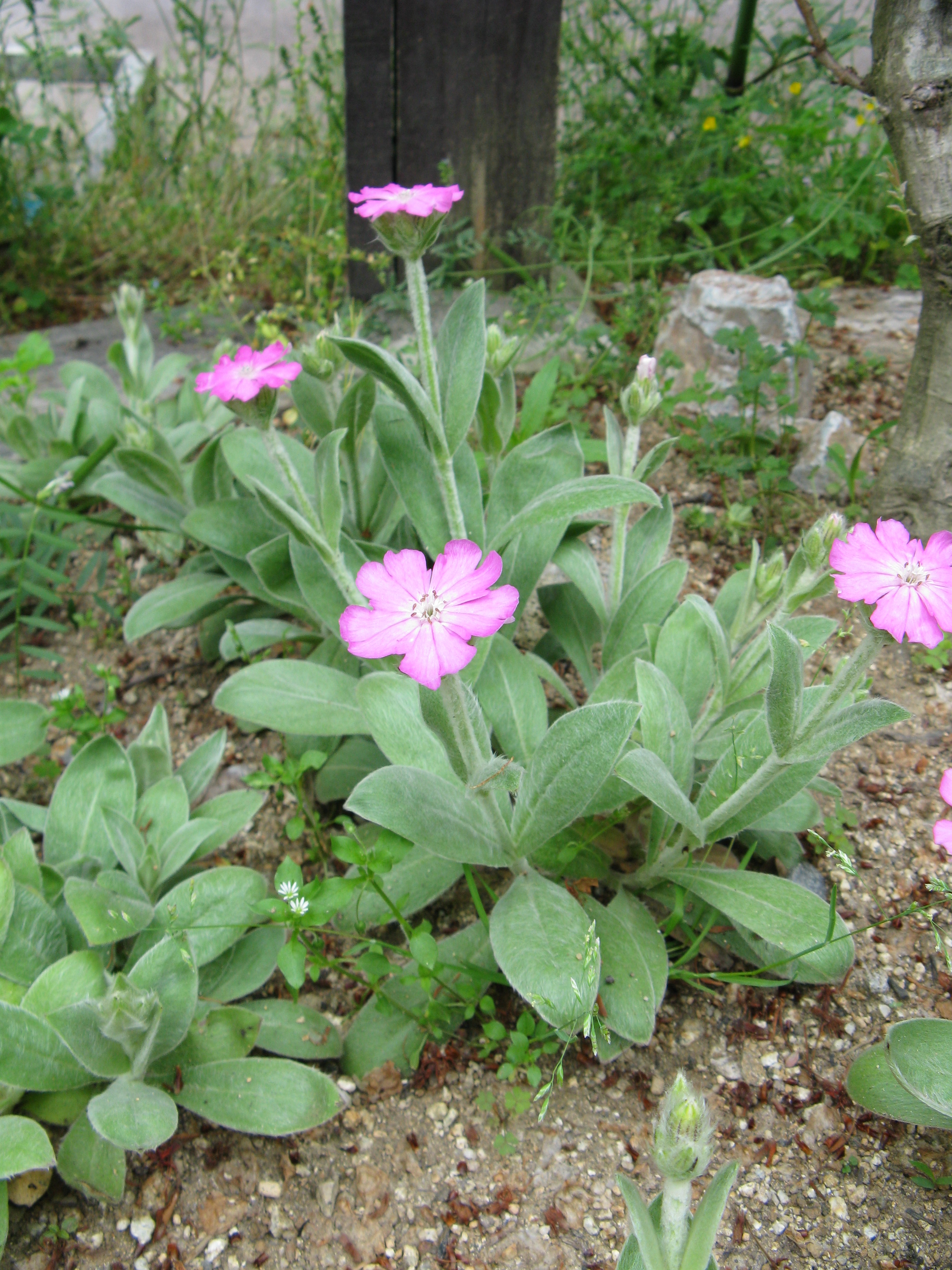
- In Osaka, Japan

Scientific classification
- Kingdom: Plantae
- Clade: Tracheophytes
- Clade: Angiosperms
- Clade: Eudicots
- Order: Caryophyllales
- Family: Caryophyllaceae
- Genus: Silene
- Species: S. flos-jovis

Binomial name
- Silene flos-jovis (L.) Greuter & Burdet

Synonyms
- Lychnis flos-jovis (L.) Desr.

= Silene flos-jovis =

Species of flowering plant

Silene flos-jovis, the flower-of-Jove, is a species of flowering plant in the family Caryophyllaceae, native to the central Alps and found at elevations of 1,000–2,400 m (3,281–7,874 ft). It is a mat-forming perennial growing to 20–60 cm (8–24 in) tall and 45 cm (18 in) wide, with hairy grey-green leaves and clusters of notched pink flowers throughout summer.

Under its former name, Lychnis flos-jovis, it has gained the Royal Horticultural Society's Award of Garden Merit.

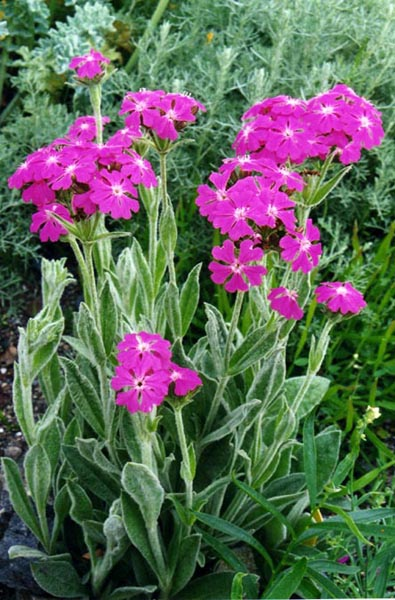
Mature plants

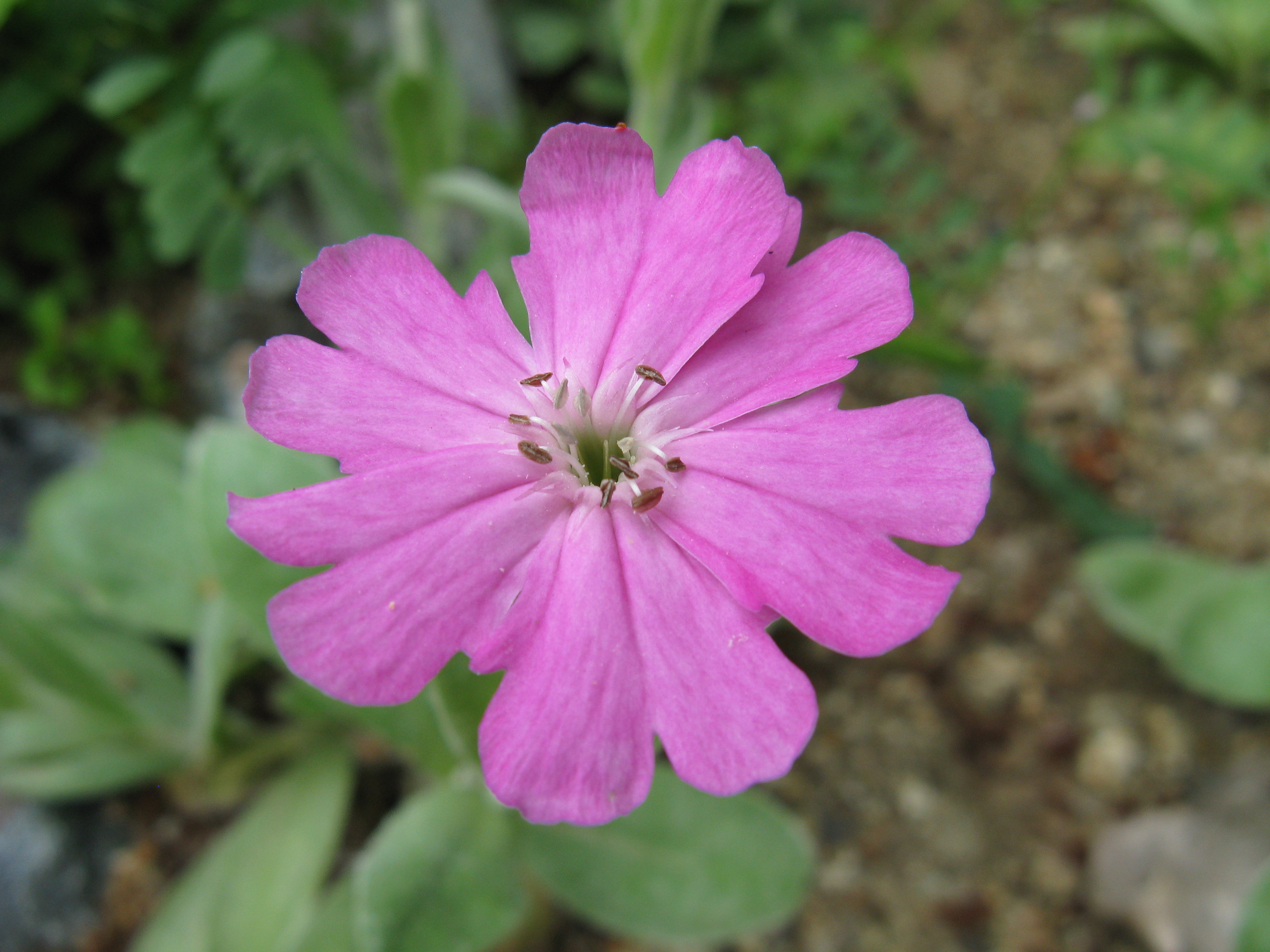
Flower close-up
