= Silene andicola =

Scientific classification
- Kingdom: Plantae
- Clade: Tracheophytes
- Clade: Angiosperms
- Clade: Eudicots
- Order: Caryophyllales
- Family: Caryophyllaceae
- Genus: Silene
- Species: S. andicola

Binomial name
- Silene andicola Gillies ex Hook. & Arn.

Synonyms
- Lychnis andicola Britton; Melandrium andicola (Gillies ex Hook. & Arn.) Rohrb.; Melandrium chilense var. argentinense Hosseus; Melandrium chilense var. cucubaloides (Fenzl ex Rohrb.) Hosseus; Melandrium cucubaloides Fenzl ex Rohrb.; Saponaria andicola (Gillies ex Hook. & Arn.) Kunze ex Rohrb.; Wahlbergella andicola (Gillies ex Hook. & Arn.) Rouy

Species of flowering plant

Silene andicola is a species of flowering plant in the family Caryophyllaceae. The species is native to Argentina, Bolivia, and Chile. Plants grow on rocky slopes, outcrops, soily screes, grasslands, and open scrubs.
