= Silene biafrae =

Conservation status
- Near Threatened (IUCN 3.1)

Scientific classification
- Kingdom: Plantae
- Clade: Tracheophytes
- Clade: Angiosperms
- Clade: Eudicots
- Order: Caryophyllales
- Family: Caryophyllaceae
- Genus: Silene
- Species: S. biafrae

Binomial name
- Silene biafrae Hook.f.

Species of flowering plant

Silene biafrae is a species of plant in the family Caryophyllaceae. It is endemic to Cameroon. Its natural habitat is subtropical or tropical dry lowland grassland.
