= Silene media =

Scientific classification
- Kingdom: Plantae
- Clade: Tracheophytes
- Clade: Angiosperms
- Clade: Eudicots
- Order: Caryophyllales
- Family: Caryophyllaceae
- Genus: Silene
- Species: S. media

Binomial name
- Silene media (Litv.) Kleopow

Synonyms
- Otites medius (Litv.) Klokov

Species of plant in the carnation family

Silene media is a species of flowering plant in the family Caryophyllaceae, native to Ukraine, parts of Russia, and Kazakhstan. It prefers to grow in un-flooded sandy soils.
