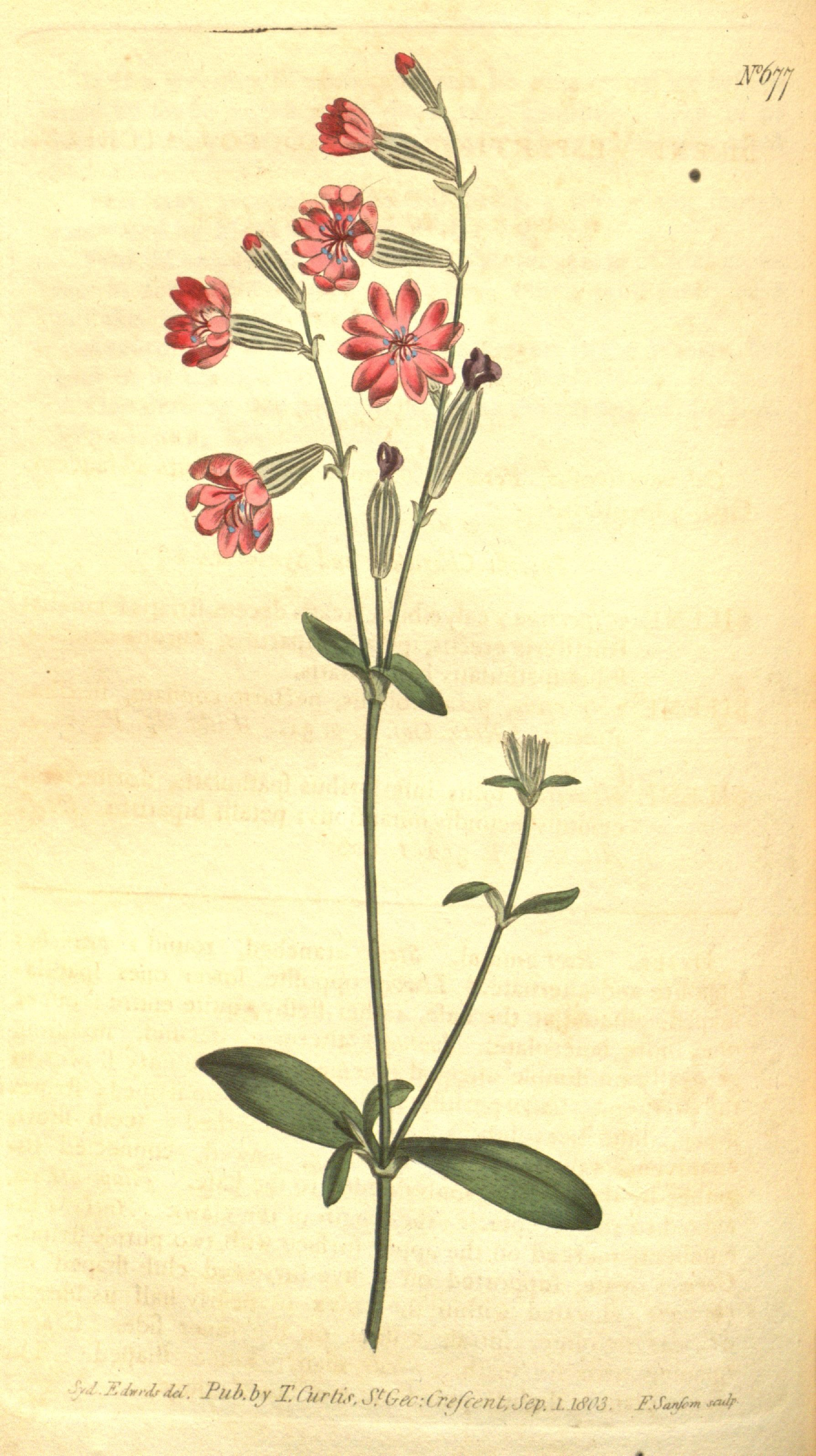

Scientific classification
- Kingdom: Plantae
- Clade: Tracheophytes
- Clade: Angiosperms
- Clade: Eudicots
- Order: Caryophyllales
- Family: Caryophyllaceae
- Genus: Silene
- Species: S. bellidifolia

Binomial name
- Silene bellidifolia Jacq.

Synonyms
- Silene vespertina

= Silene bellidifolia =

Species of plant

Silene bellidifolia is a species of plants in the family Caryophyllaceae (carpetweeds).

== Sources ==
This article incorporates text from a free content work. Licensed under CC0 (license statement/permission). Text taken from Silene bellidifolia. Encyclopedia of Life.
