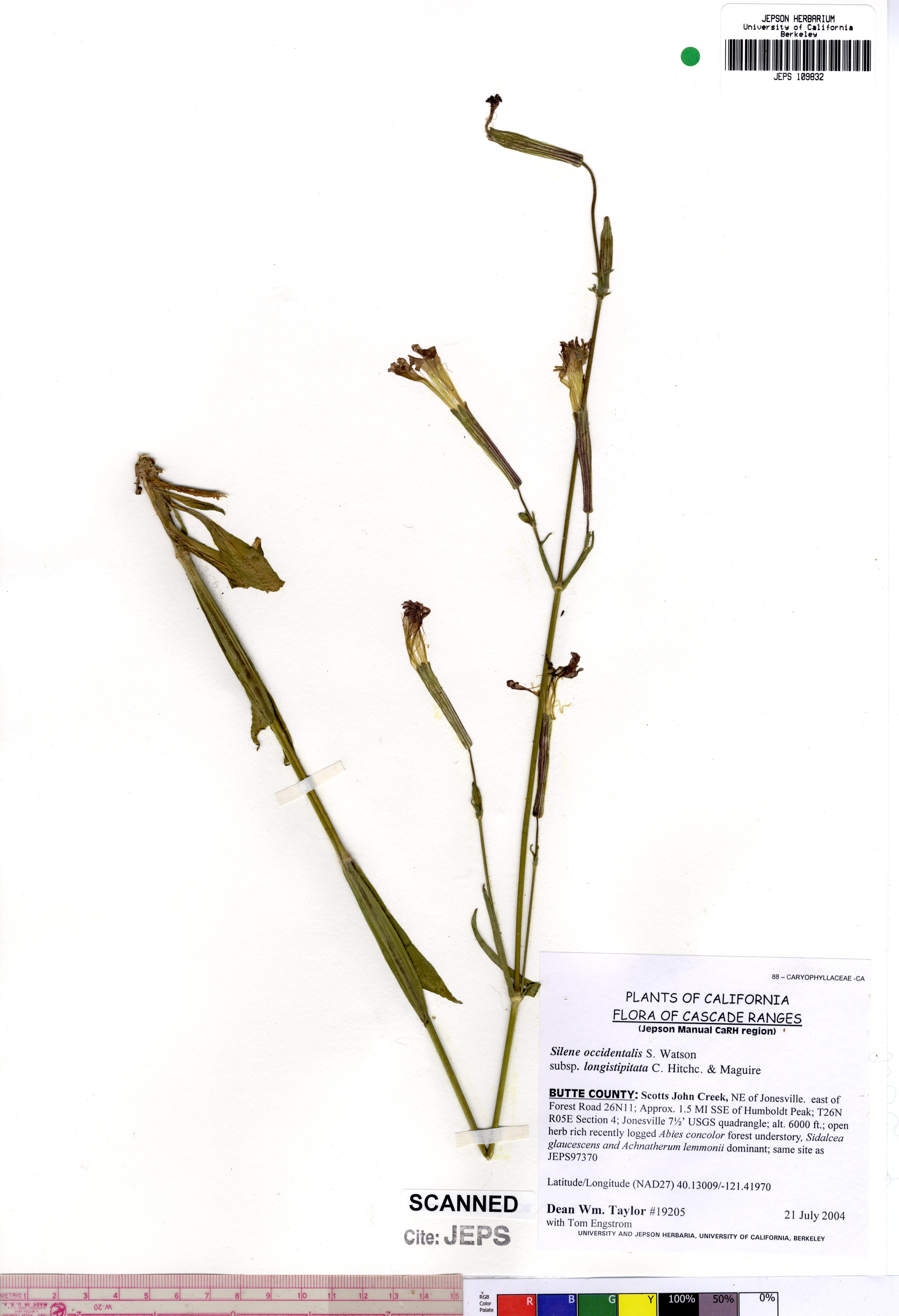
- Herbarium specimen, subsp. longistipata

Scientific classification
- Kingdom: Plantae
- Clade: Tracheophytes
- Clade: Angiosperms
- Clade: Eudicots
- Order: Caryophyllales
- Family: Caryophyllaceae
- Genus: Silene
- Species: S. occidentalis

Binomial name
- Silene occidentalis S.Watson 1875

= Silene occidentalis =

Species of flowering plant

Silene occidentalis is a species of flowering plant in the family Caryophyllaceae known by the common names western catchfly and western campion.

It is endemic to northern California, where it is known from the southern Cascade Range and sections of the Modoc Plateau and Sierra Nevada. It grows in chaparral and mountain forest habitat.

== Description ==
Silene occidentalis is a perennial herb growing from a woody, leafy caudex and taproot, sending up an upright, mostly unbranched stem which may be 60 centimeters tall. The lance-shaped leaves are up to 12 centimeters long around the caudex, and shorter higher up the stem. Flowers occur in a terminal cyme and sometimes in leaf axils. Each flower is encapsulated in a hairy, glandular calyx of fused sepals. The calyx in this species can be very long, nearly 4 centimeters in length in subspecies longistipata. At the end are five pink petals, each with usually four fringelike lobes at the tip.
