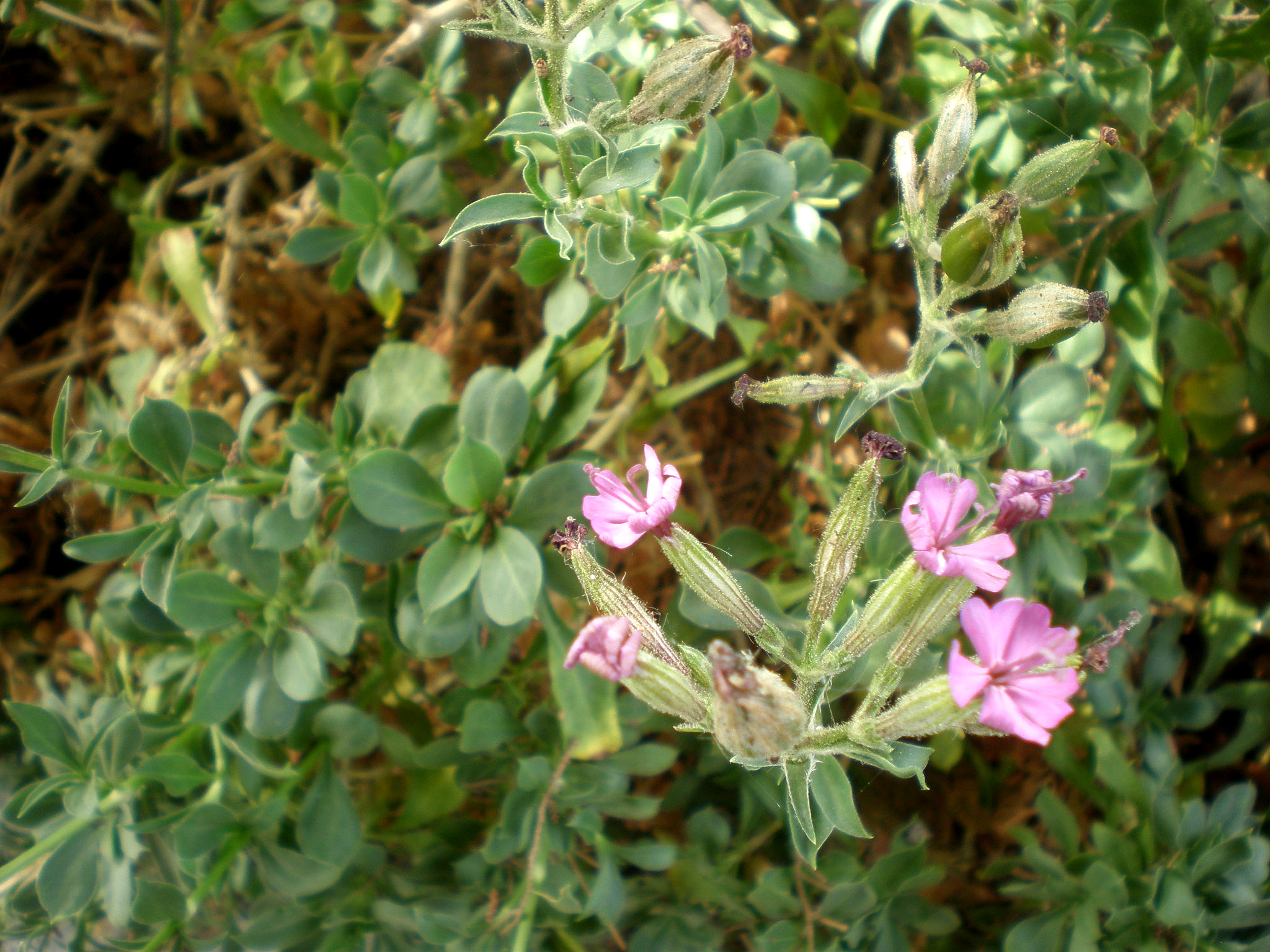

Scientific classification
- Kingdom: Plantae
- Clade: Tracheophytes
- Clade: Angiosperms
- Clade: Eudicots
- Order: Caryophyllales
- Family: Caryophyllaceae
- Genus: Silene
- Species: S. fruticosa

Binomial name
- Silene fruticosa L.

= Silene fruticosa =

Species of plant

Silene fruticosa is a species of perennial herb in the family Caryophyllaceae (carpetweeds). They have a self-supporting growth form. Individuals can grow to 0.2 m.

== Sources ==
This article incorporates text from a free content work. Licensed under CC0 (license statement/permission). Text taken from Silene fruticosa. Encyclopedia of Life.
