= Silene marmorensis =

Conservation status
- Imperiled (NatureServe)

Scientific classification
- Kingdom: Plantae
- Clade: Tracheophytes
- Clade: Angiosperms
- Clade: Eudicots
- Order: Caryophyllales
- Family: Caryophyllaceae
- Genus: Silene
- Species: S. marmorensis

Binomial name
- Silene marmorensis Kruckeb.

Species of flowering plant

Silene marmorensis is a rare species of flowering plant in the family Caryophyllaceae known by the common names Marble Mountain catchfly, Marble Mountain campion, and Somes Bar campion. It is endemic to the southern Klamath Mountains of northern California, where it grows in mountain woodlands and forests. It is a perennial herb producing several stems and shoots from a woody, branching caudex and thick taproot. The hairy, glandular stems grow erect to a maximum height near 40 centimeters. The lance-shaped leaves are a few centimeters long and are borne in pairs, the lowermost drying early. The inflorescence is a terminal cyme of flowers at the top of the stem, and some flowers may occur in the leaf axils. Each flower has a hairy, veined calyx of fused sepals. The flowers bloom at night, the five pinkish or green-tinged petals opening at the tip of the calyx.

This species is threatened by logging operations and other degradation of its habitat.
