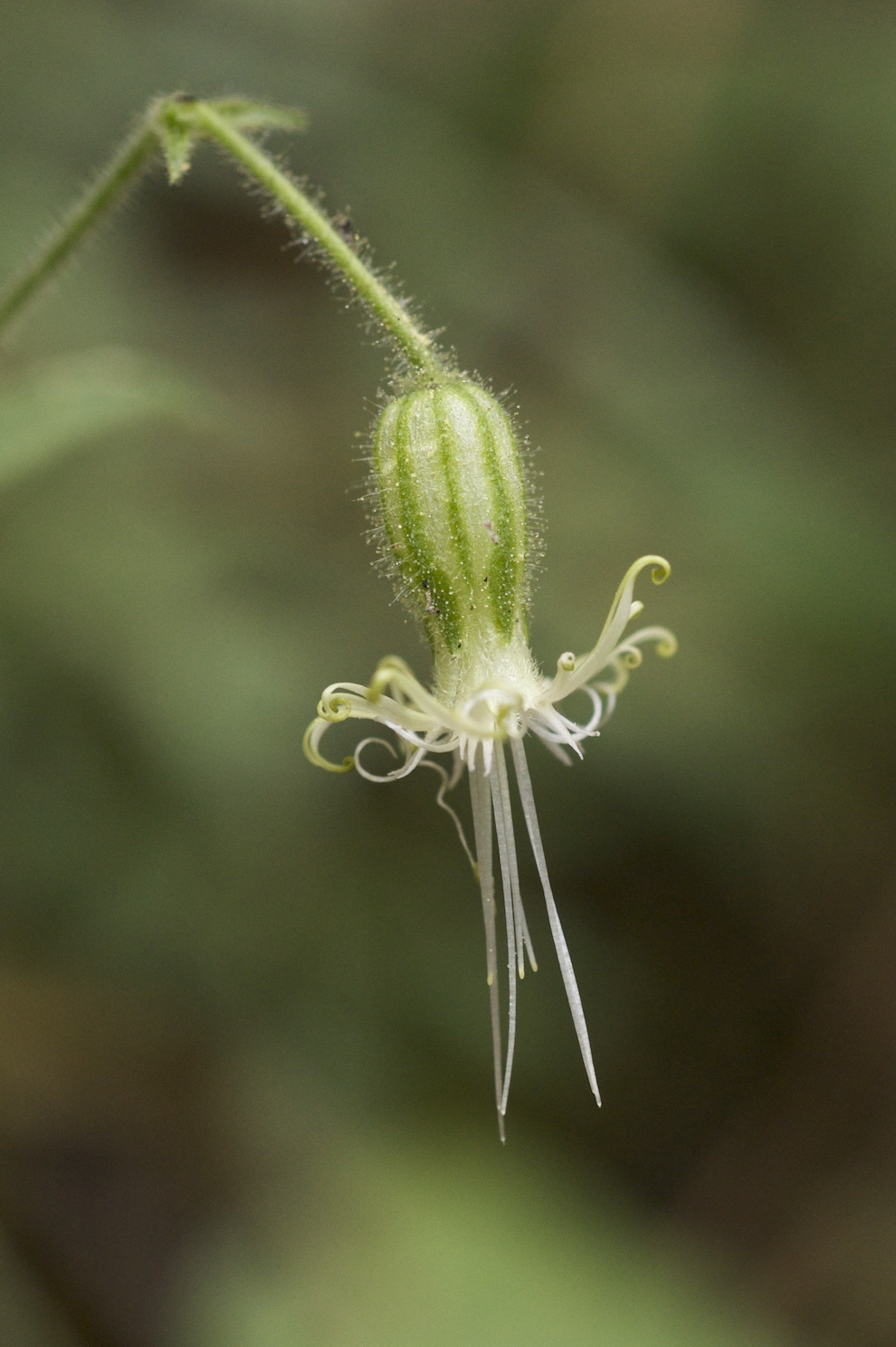

Scientific classification
- Kingdom: Plantae
- Clade: Tracheophytes
- Clade: Angiosperms
- Clade: Eudicots
- Order: Caryophyllales
- Family: Caryophyllaceae
- Genus: Silene
- Species: S. lemmonii

Binomial name
- Silene lemmonii S.Watson

Synonyms
- Silene palmeri

= Silene lemmonii =

Species of flowering plant

Silene lemmonii is a species of flowering plant in the family Caryophyllaceae known by the common name Lemmon's catchfly.

It is native to the mountains of Oregon and California, where it grows in many types of woodland and forest habitat, often in moist areas.

== Description ==
Silene lemmonii is a perennial herb producing several stems and shoots from a woody, branching caudex. The decumbent or upright stems may be up to 45 centimeters long and are hairy, the hairs on the upper parts glandular. Most of the leaves are located low on the plant and are oval to lance-shaped, measuring a few centimeters in length; smaller leaves may occur on the upper stem.

The inflorescence bears 1 to 7 nodding flowers on sticky glandular stalks. The moth-pollinated flower has a tubular or inflated calyx of fused sepals open at the tip to reveal five petals. The petals are whitish, yellowish, or pinkish, and their tips are deeply divided into four narrow, sometimes hairlike lobes that may curl and tangle. The long stamens protrude from the mouth of the flower, and the three whiskerlike styles protrude even further.
