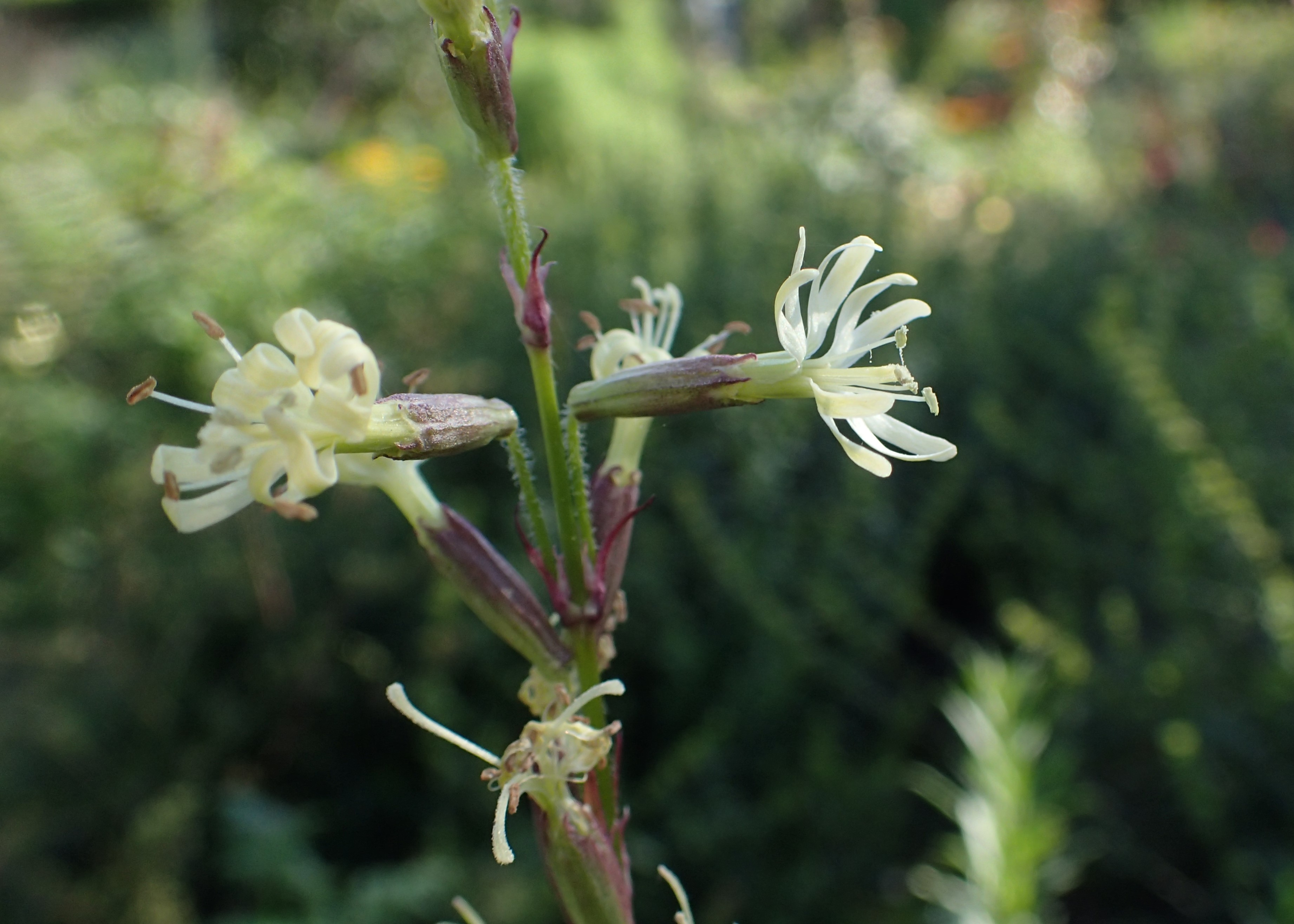
- Flowers

Scientific classification
- Kingdom: Plantae
- Clade: Tracheophytes
- Clade: Angiosperms
- Clade: Eudicots
- Order: Caryophyllales
- Family: Caryophyllaceae
- Genus: Silene
- Species: S. tatarica

Binomial name
- Silene tatarica (L.) Pers.

Synonyms
- List: Cucubalus secundus Gilib.; Cucubalus tataricus L.; Silene ruthenica Otth; Silene secunda Steud.; Viscago tartarica (L.) Hornem.; Viscago unilateralis Moench

= Silene tatarica =

Species of flowering plant

Silene tatarica, called the Tartarian catchfly, is a species of flowering plant in the genus Silene, found in north-central Europe and western Asia, from Germany and Norway eastwards to western Siberia and Kazakhstan. A specialist of riparian habitats, its seeds are dispersed by water.
