= Silene calabra =

Scientific classification
- Kingdom: Plantae
- Clade: Tracheophytes
- Clade: Angiosperms
- Clade: Eudicots
- Order: Caryophyllales
- Family: Caryophyllaceae
- Genus: Silene
- Species: S. calabra

Binomial name
- Silene calabra Brullo, Scelsi & Spamp.

Species of flowering plant

Silene calabra is a species of flowering plant native to Italy.
