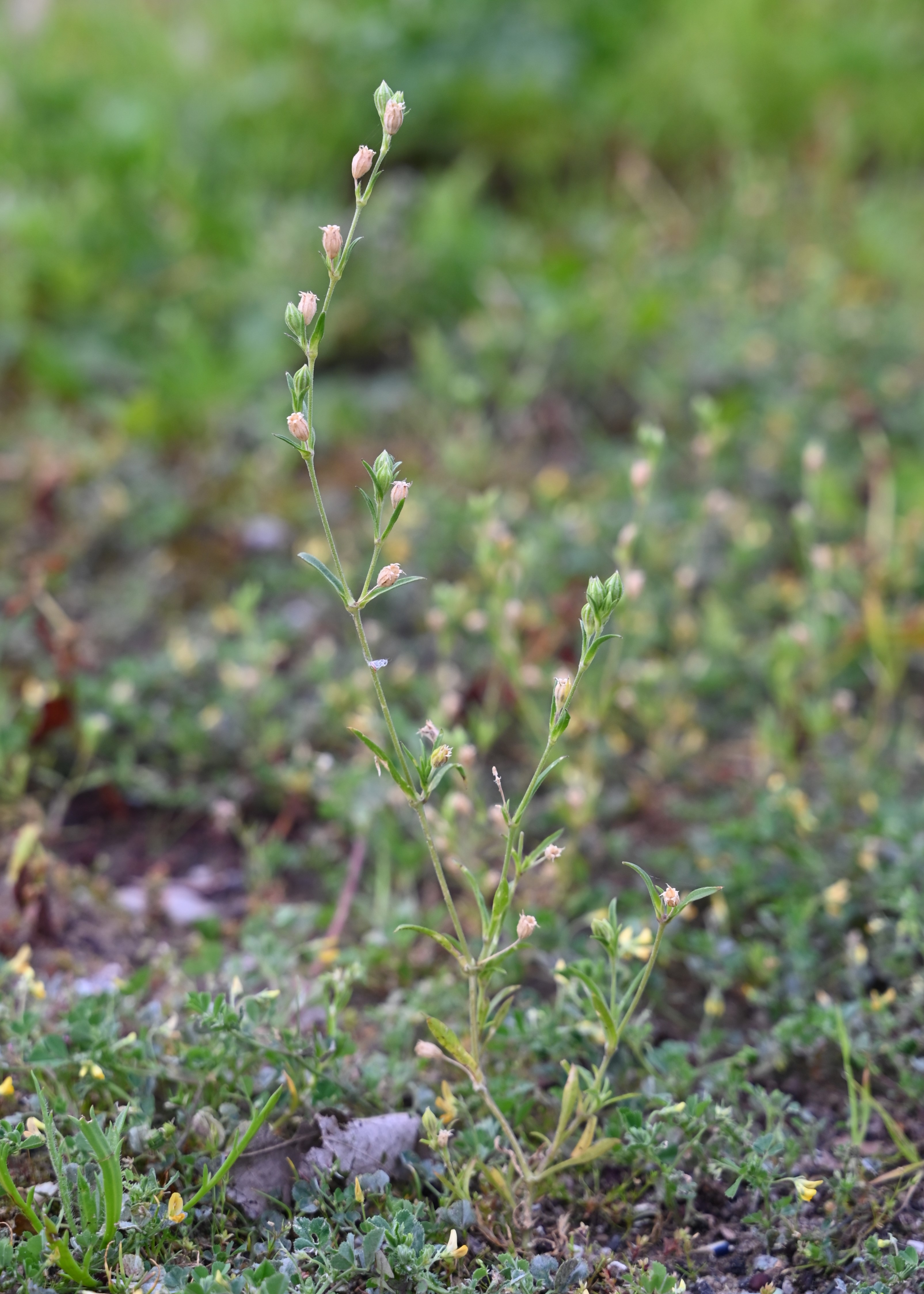

Scientific classification
- Kingdom: Plantae
- Clade: Tracheophytes
- Clade: Angiosperms
- Clade: Eudicots
- Order: Caryophyllales
- Family: Caryophyllaceae
- Genus: Silene
- Species: S. apetala

Binomial name
- Silene apetala Willd.

= Silene apetala =

Species of flowering plant in the carnation family

Silene apetala is a plant in the carnation family Caryophyllaceae, first described in by Carl Ludwig Willdenow.

This species is native in countries from the Mediterranean to Northern Somalia and to Pakistan. It is listed as an invasive species in Australia, where it is commonly found in the drier parts of South Australia, New South Wales and Victoria, and also in France.

== Gallery ==
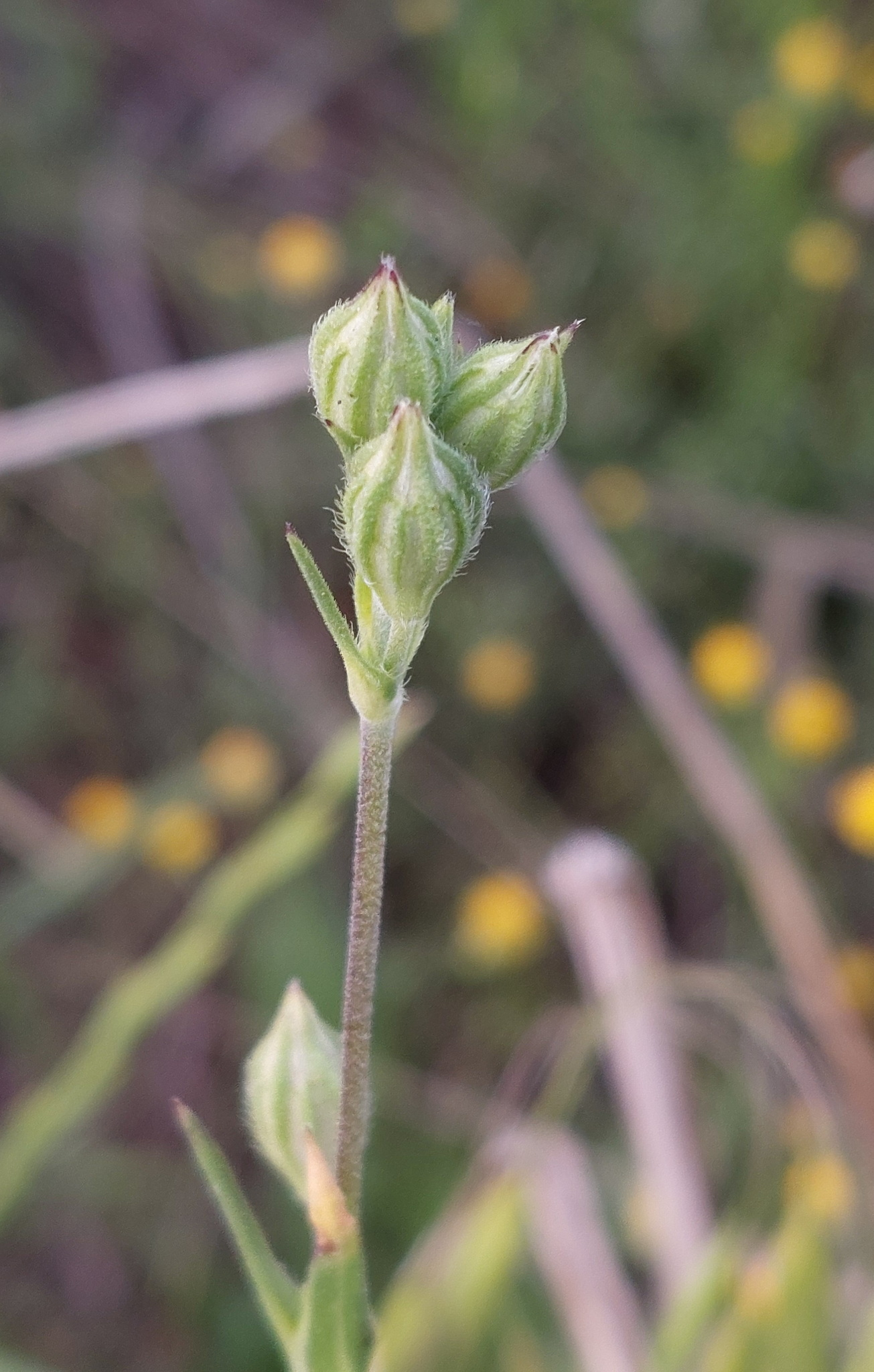
Buds

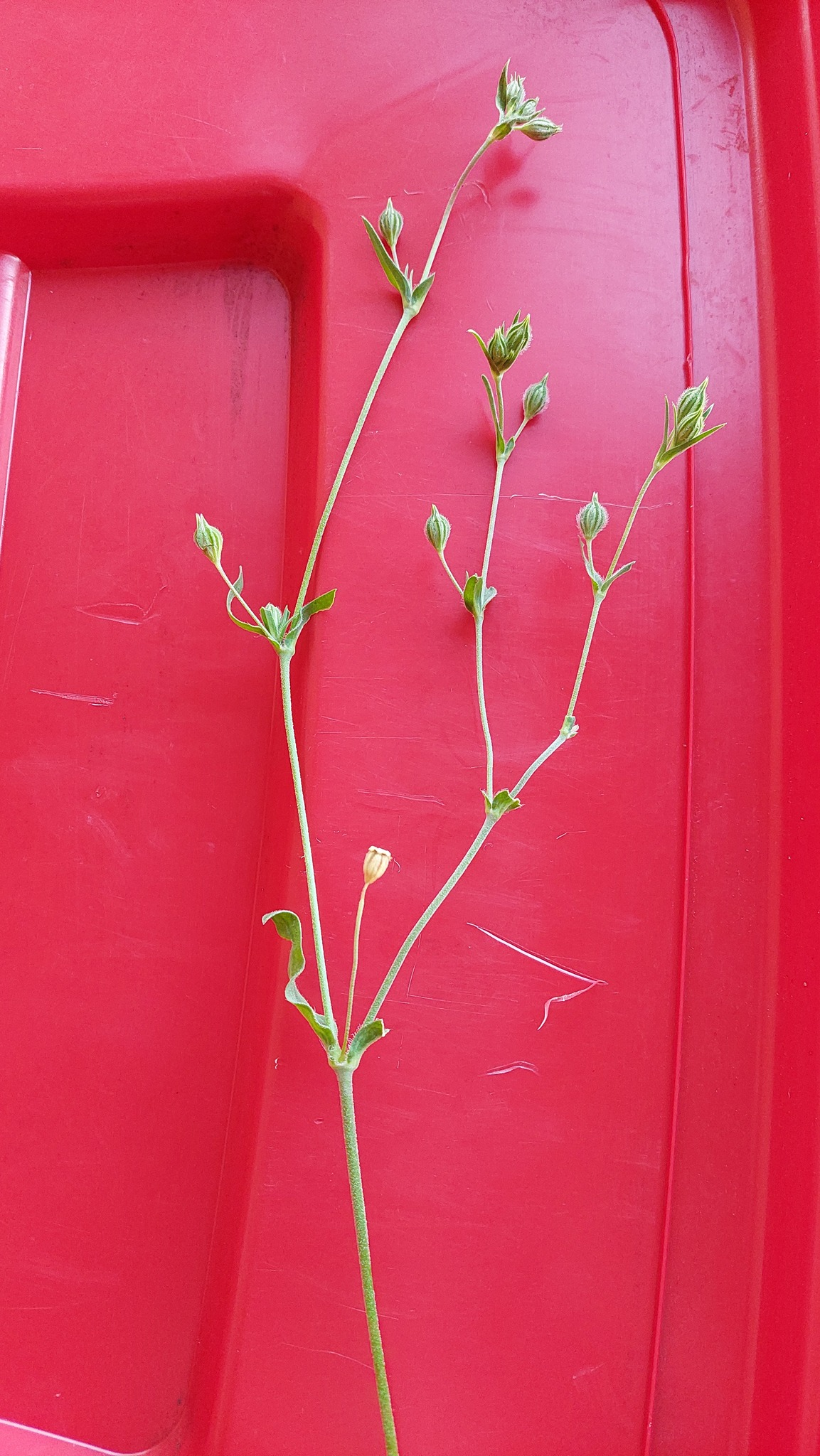
Specimen

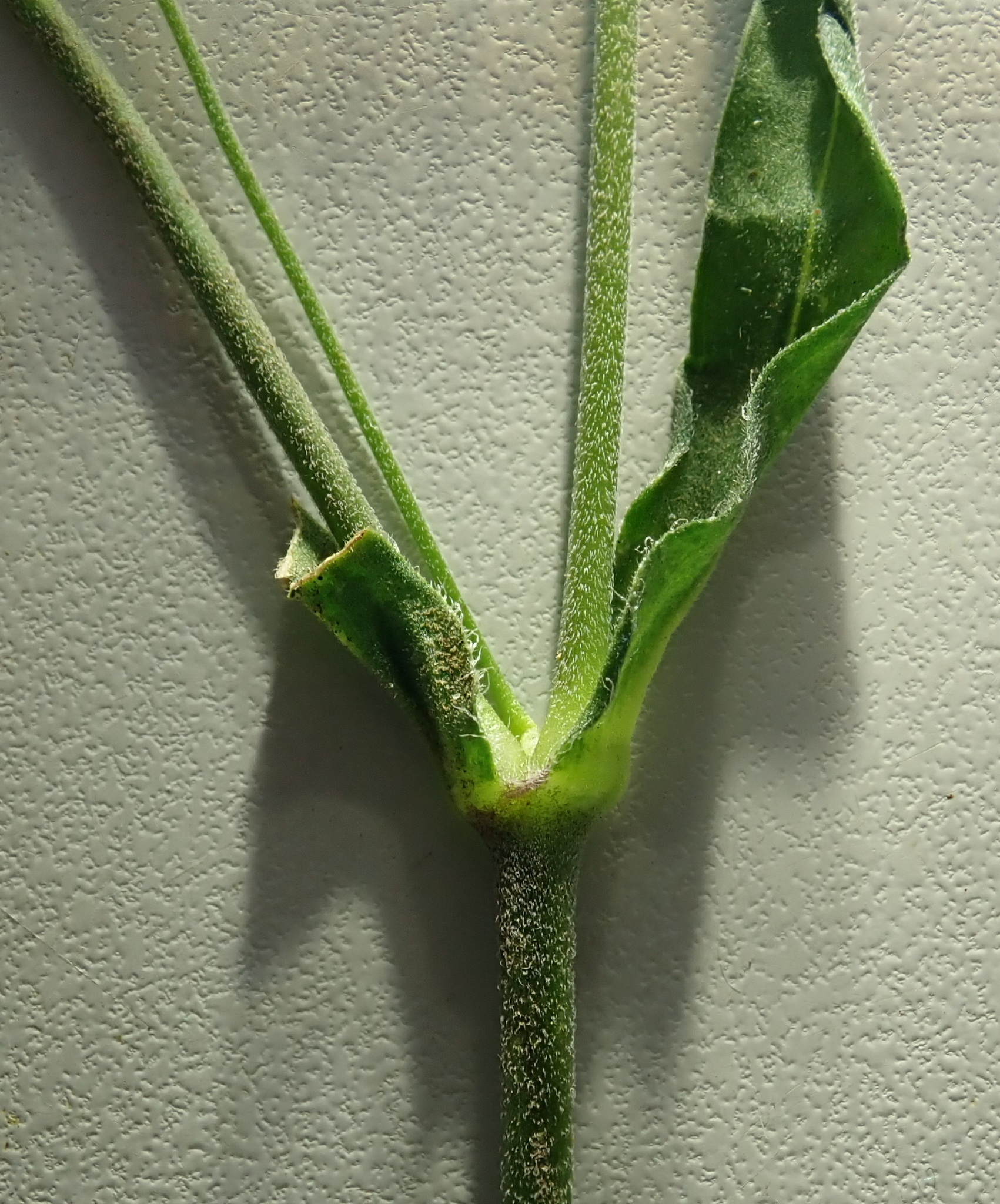

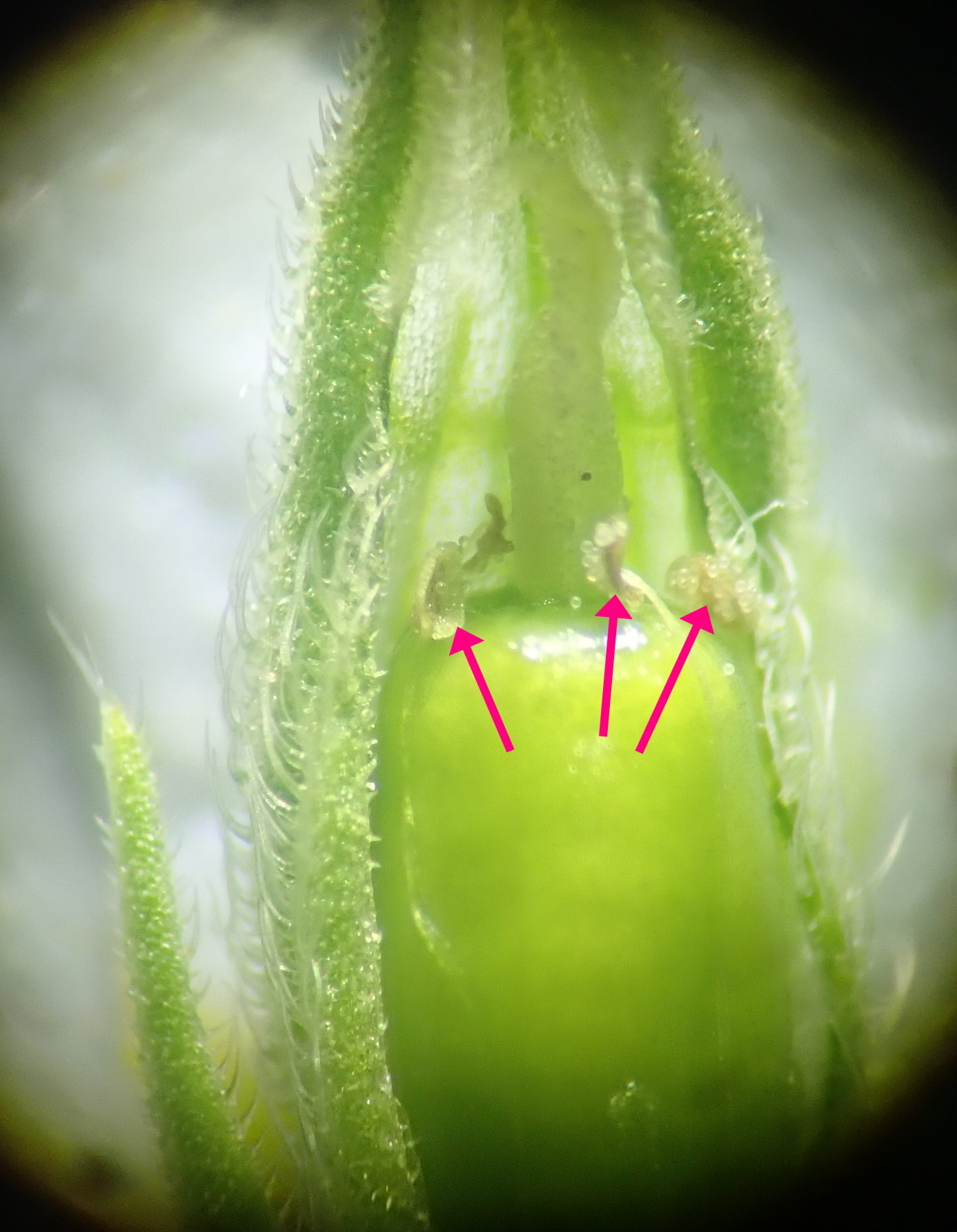

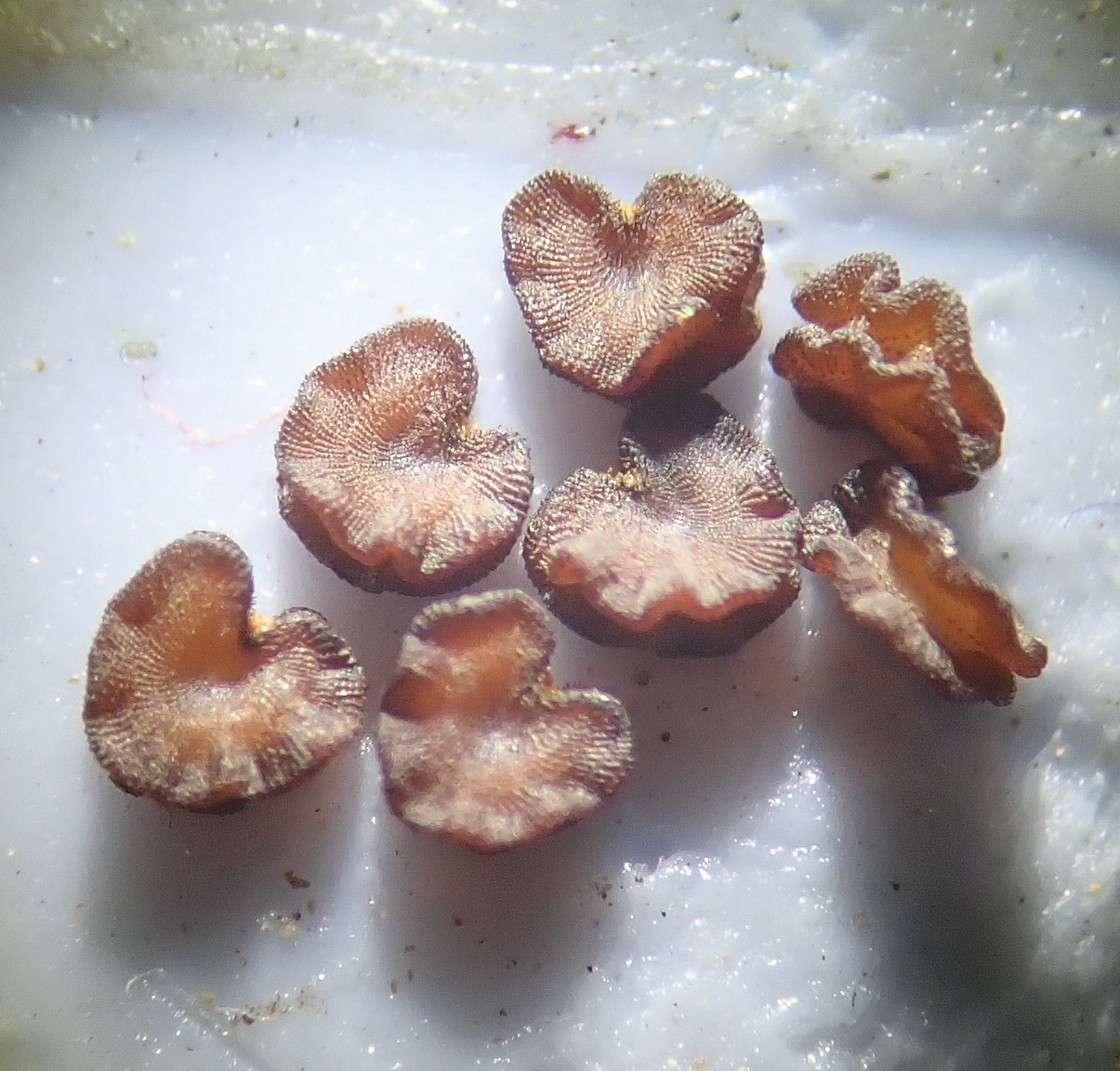
