= Silene aperta =

Scientific classification
- Kingdom: Plantae
- Clade: Tracheophytes
- Clade: Angiosperms
- Clade: Eudicots
- Order: Caryophyllales
- Family: Caryophyllaceae
- Genus: Silene
- Species: S. aperta

Binomial name
- Silene aperta Greene

Species of flowering plant

Silene aperta is a rare species of flowering plant in the family Caryophyllaceae known by the common names naked catchfly and Tulare campion. It is endemic to Tulare County, California, where it is known only from the coniferous forests of the High Sierra Nevada. It is a perennial herb growing from a woody, branching caudex sending up several erect stems up to about 60 centimetres (24 inches) tall. The lower leaves are linear in shape, up to 12 cm (4 3/4 in) long but less than one wide. Leaves higher on the stem are smaller. The flower has a hairy, tubular calyx of fused sepals with ten veins. The calyx is open at the top, revealing five white or yellow-green petals each 1 to 2 cm (3/8 to 3/4 in) long.
