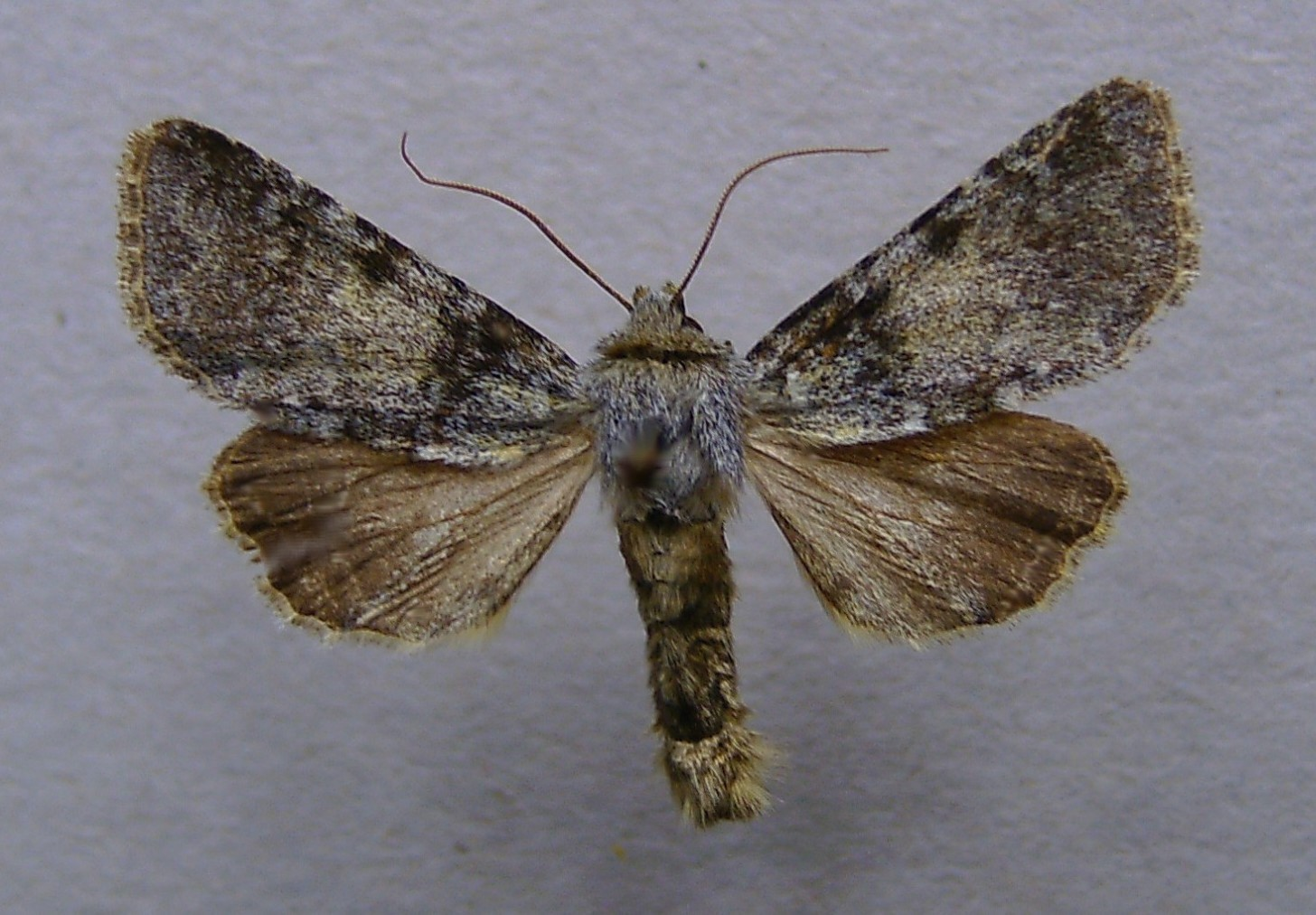

Scientific classification
- Domain: Eukaryota
- Kingdom: Animalia
- Phylum: Arthropoda
- Class: Insecta
- Order: Lepidoptera
- Superfamily: Noctuoidea
- Family: Noctuidae
- Genus: Hadena
- Species: H. caesia

Binomial name
- Hadena caesia (Denis & Schiffermüller, 1775)

Synonyms
- Noctua caesia Denis & Schiffermüller, 1775; Phalaena (Noctua) dichroma Esper, 1790; Dianthoecia caesia f. maritima Turati & Verity, 1911; Hadena frigida Zetterstedt, [1839]

= Hadena caesia =

Species of moth

Hadena caesia, also called the grey, is a species of moth of the family Noctuidae. It has a scattered distribution all over Europe (see subspecies section).

== Technical description and variation ==
The wingspan is 32–37 millimetres (1.3–1.5 in). Forewing blue grey, with a furry look, caused by dusky grey irroration; both folds tinged with fulvous; lines and markings often indistinct; upper stigmata pale, with yellow scales in their annuli; a dark antemedian band widened to inner margin and a less prominent dark submarginal cloud; a small dark blotch at middle of costa; hindwing dark fuscous, paler towards base; — manani Gregs. from the Isle of Man and the Irish coast, is uniformly darker slate colour; — ab. nigrescens Stgr., from the Pyrenees, Alps, and Mts. of Scandinavia is much darker, the forewing suffused with black; on the other hand [now full species Hadena clara] Stgr., from Armenia and Asia Minor, has the forewing greyer, with a pinkish tinge; the median area paler.

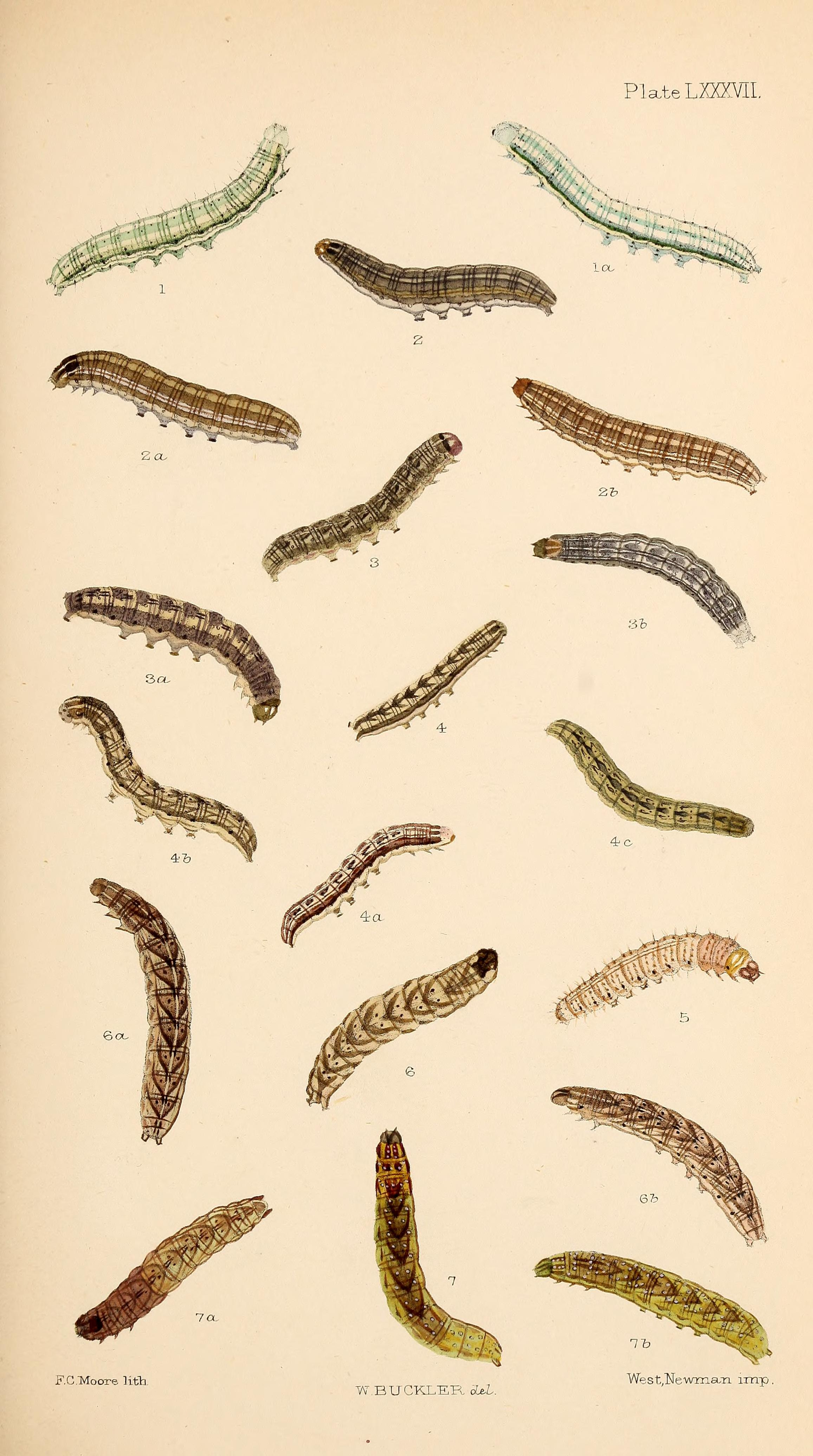
Figs.3, 3a, 3 b larvae after final moult

== Biology ==
Adults are on wing from June to August.

Larva brownish ochreous, freckled with darker; a dorsal series of V-shaped marks; subdorsal line darker. The young larvae feed on capsules of various Silene species (including Silene nutans and Silene vulgaris). Later, they feed on the leaves. They overwinter as a pupa.

== Subspecies ==
- ssp. caesia (Denis&Schiffermüller, 1775) (Alps)
- ssp. abruzzensis (Draudt, 1934) (Apennine Mountains)
- ssp. ostrogovichi (Hacker, 1989) (Carpathian Mountains)
- ssp. bulgarica (Boursin, 1959) (Bulgaria)
- ssp. xanthophoba (Schawerda, 1922) (Balkan Peninsula)
- ssp. mananii (Gregson, 1866) (Great Britain, Ireland and the Isle of Man from where it is named)
- ssp. frigida (Zetterstedt, 1839) (southern Fennoscandia)
- ssp. grisea (Hospital, 1948) (mountains of northern Spain)
- ssp. revolcadorensis (Calle, 1983) (the Region of Murcia)
- ssp. castiliana (Reisser, 1935) (Castile region)
