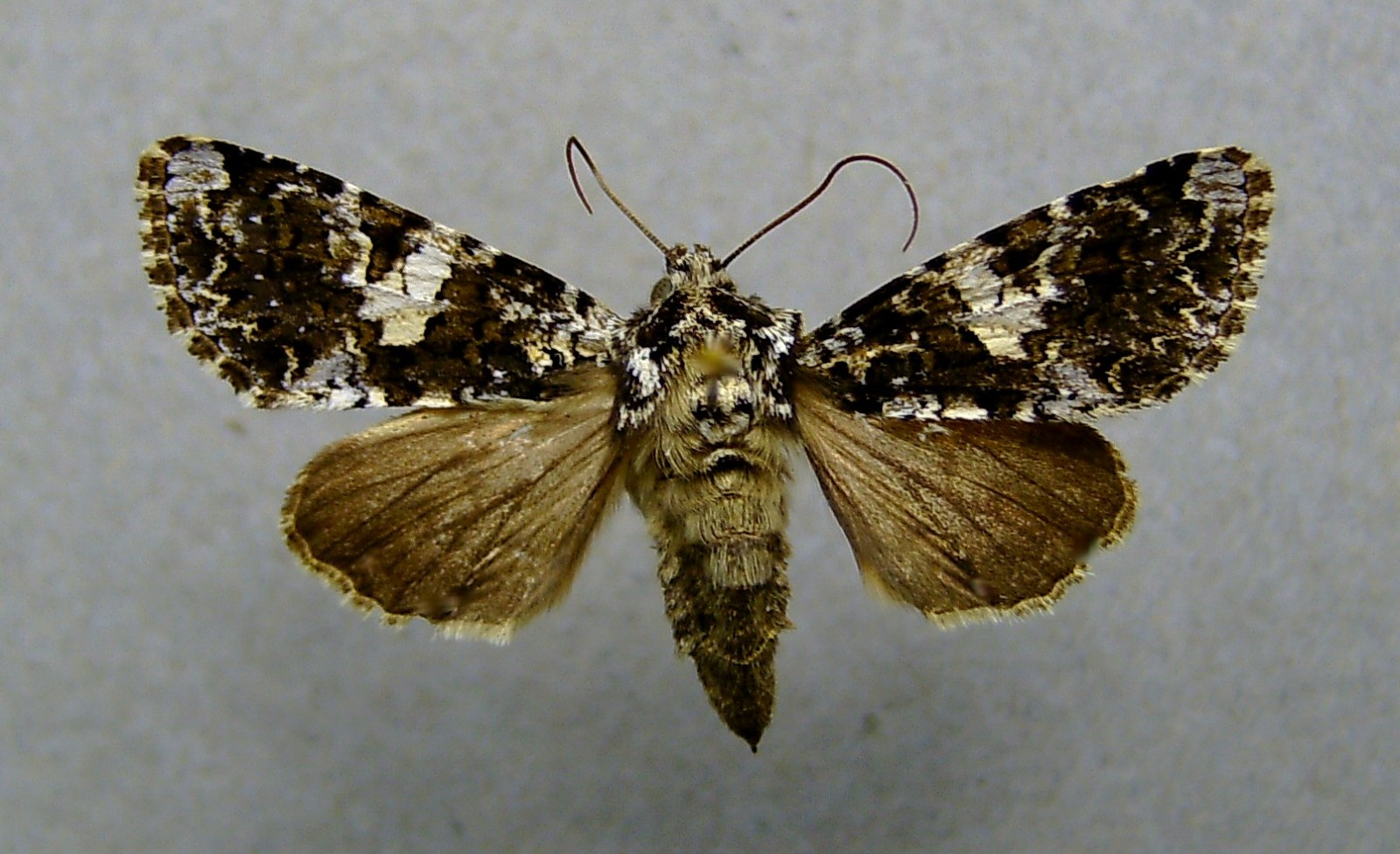

Scientific classification
- Domain: Eukaryota
- Kingdom: Animalia
- Phylum: Arthropoda
- Class: Insecta
- Order: Lepidoptera
- Superfamily: Noctuoidea
- Family: Noctuidae
- Genus: Hadena
- Species: H. confusa

Binomial name
- Hadena confusa Hufnagel, 1766

Synonyms
- Phalaena confusa; Phalaena nana; Noctua conspersa; Bombyx annulata; Phalaena x-scriptum; Dianthoecia nana; Harmodia nana

= Hadena confusa =

Marbled coronet

Species of moth

Hadena confusa, the marbled coronet, is a species of moth of the family Noctuidae. It is found in Europe, North Africa and West Asia and Central Asia.

== Description ==
The wingspan is 27–35 mm. The forewing ground colour is purplish fuscous tinged with olive grey. The stigmata are fused together forming a large white patch and there is a small white apical blotch. The subterminal line is white in colour and irregular wavy and joins the apical white stain. The basal field shows a more or less pronounced whitening. The fringe is chequered. The hindwings are fuscous with a small discal lunule and white fringe. The hindwings are slightly darker on the outside In very humid areas melanistic individuals can occur primarily in the Shetland and Orkney Islands, parts of the Hebrides, as well as in Wales and Scotland.

== Similar species ==
There is a similarity to Hadena compta, which is smaller (wingspan 21 to 29 millimetres), has no clear white spot on the apex of the forewings and whose white band is stronger and more coherent.

== Biology ==
The moth flies from May to July and sometimes from August to September in a second generation depending on the location.

The larvae feed on Dianthus and Silene species, such as Silene nutans and Silene vulgaris.

== Subspecies ==
- Hadena confusa confusa
- Hadena confusa herczigi
- Hadena confusa iliensis
