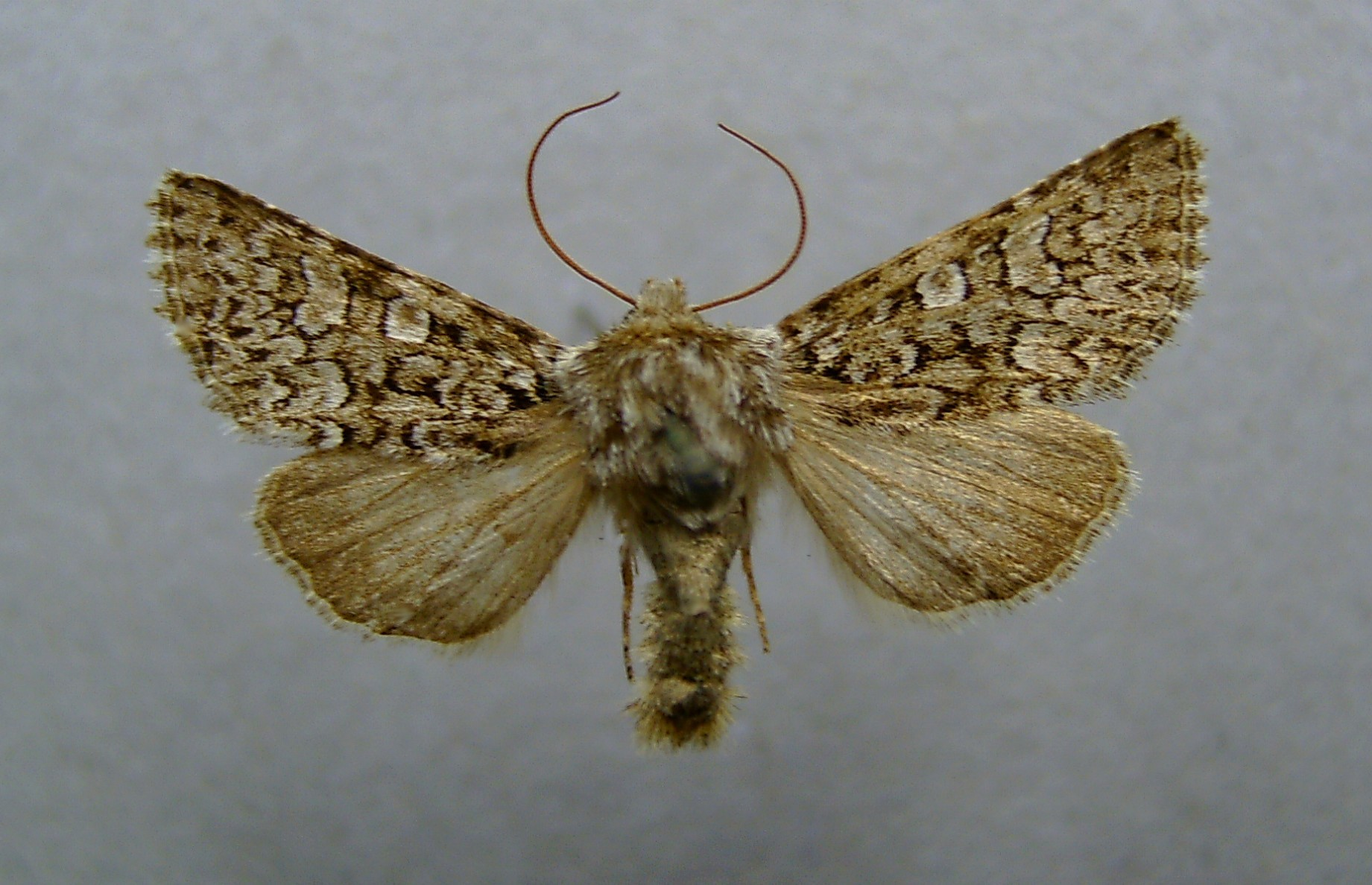

Scientific classification
- Kingdom: Animalia
- Phylum: Arthropoda
- Clade: Pancrustacea
- Class: Insecta
- Order: Lepidoptera
- Superfamily: Noctuoidea
- Family: Noctuidae
- Genus: Hadena
- Species: H. filograna

Binomial name
- Hadena filograna (Esper, 1788)

Synonyms
- Phalaena (Noctua) filograna Esper, 1788; Phalaena (Noctua) filigrama Esper, 1796; Noctua polymita Hübner, [1803]; Noctua xanthocyanea Hübner, [1819]; Xanthopastis flavivibica Hübner, [1821]; Dianthoecia estonica Draudt, 1934; Hadena filigramma (misspelling)

= Hadena filograna =

Species of moth

Hadena filograna is a species of moth of the family Noctuidae. Subspecies filograna is found from central and southern Europe to Anatolia. The most northern part of the range is Sweden. Subspecies conspargata is found in Ukraine and from southern Russia to the Altai Mountains and ssp. rungsi is found in North Africa.

== Description ==
The wingspan is 30–35 mm (1.2–1.4 in). Warren states H. filigrama Esp. (= filograna Esp., filigramma Frr., flavivibica Hbn.) (18f). Like magnolii, but the forewing dusted with ferruginous scales; the type form is brown, like magnolii, in ground colour, without white admixture, and is restricted in range, occurring, authentically, only in the Mts. of S. Hungary.

== Subspecies ==
- Hadena filograna filograna
- Hadena filograna conspargata
- Hadena filograna rungsi

== Biology ==
Adults are on wing from May to June.

The larvae feed on Silene nutans and Silene vulgaris.
