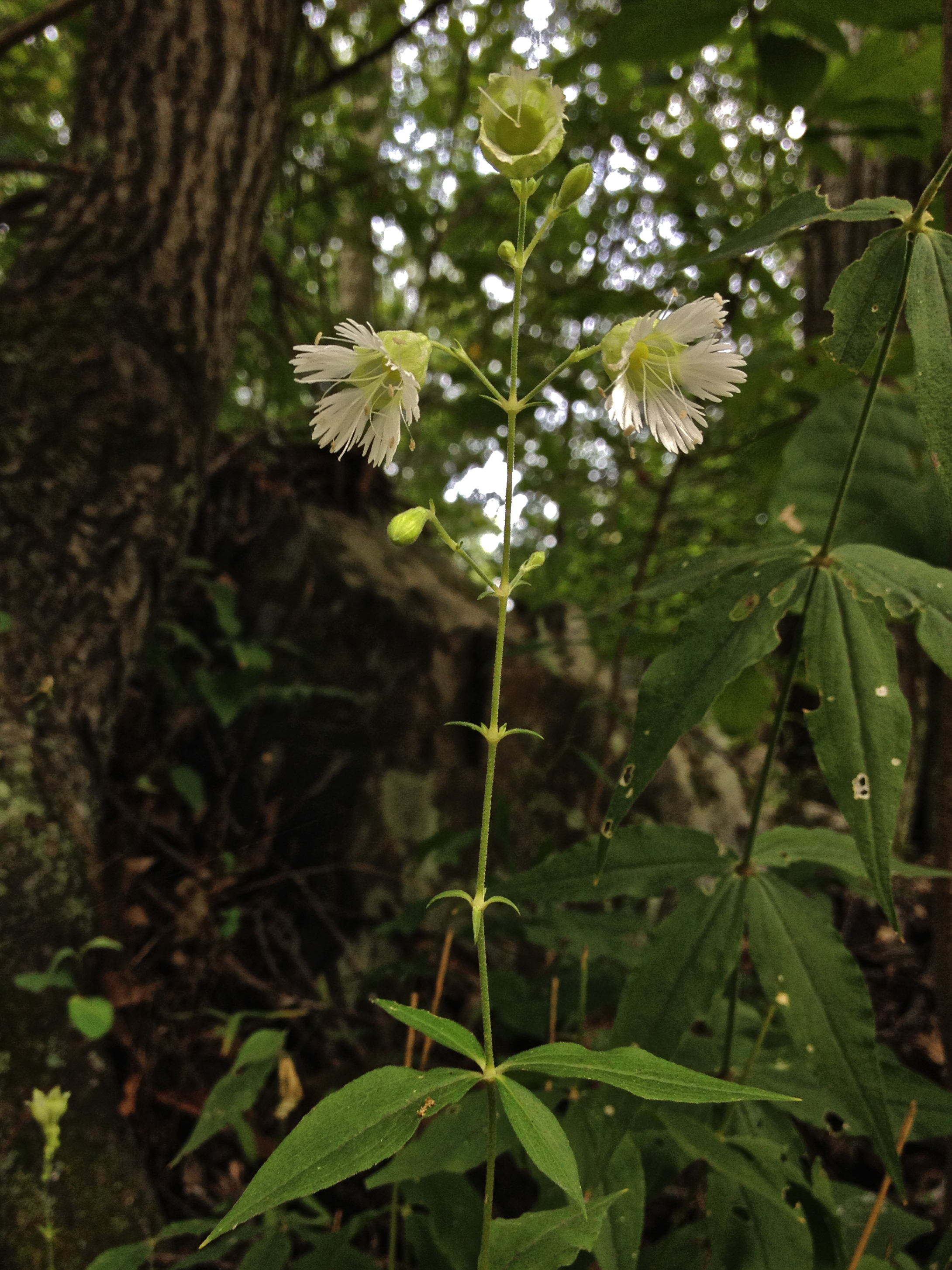

Scientific classification
- Kingdom: Plantae
- Clade: Tracheophytes
- Clade: Angiosperms
- Clade: Eudicots
- Order: Caryophyllales
- Family: Caryophyllaceae
- Genus: Silene
- Species: S. stellata

Binomial name
- Silene stellata (L.) W.T. Aiton

= Silene stellata =

Species of flowering plant

Silene stellata, known by the common names starry campion, widow's frill, and whorled catchfly, is a perennial herbaceous summer forb with white flowers, native to the central and eastern United States. It grows in habitats such as forests, river flats, and tall grass prairies.

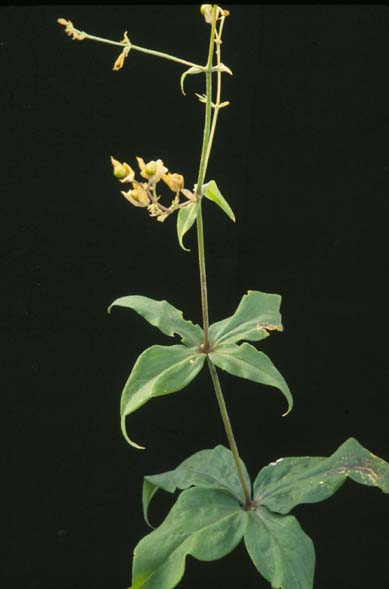

== Description ==
S. stellata grows to a height of 0.3–1 metre (1–3 ft), with one or multiple stems rising from the rootstock. The stems are a purplish color near the bottom and a pale green toward the top, except at leaf nodes, which are also a purplish color. Leaves are lanceolate, sessile, and have a smooth margin. They are opposite near the bottom of the plant and in whorls of 4 on the rest of the stem. Leaves are up to 10 centimetres (4 in) long and 3.8 centimetres (1.5 in) wide. The inflorescence is a loose panicle consisting of several branches, each with 1 to 6 or more white flowers with 5 petals. Flowers are up to 1.9 centimetres (0.75 in) wide. The flowers have no scent.

== Etymology ==
Silene is from the Greek god Silenus. Stellata means "star-shaped" in Latin.

== Distribution and habitat ==
The plant can be found in woods, river flats, and tall grass prairies, and it prefers a dry to mesic habitat with light shade or partial sun. It is native to the central and eastern United States, from Texas to the west and Vermont to the east and north.

== Ecology ==
S. stellata blooms from June to September for 3 to 4 weeks. The white flowers close when there is bright sun. Moths are the primary pollinators, although butterflies also pollinate the flowers. The plant is a host for the caterpillars of the Hadena ectypa moth.
