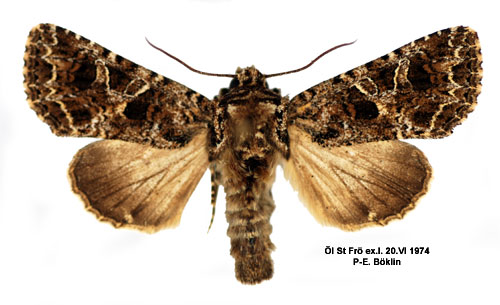

Scientific classification
- Domain: Eukaryota
- Kingdom: Animalia
- Phylum: Arthropoda
- Class: Insecta
- Order: Lepidoptera
- Superfamily: Noctuoidea
- Family: Noctuidae
- Genus: Hadena
- Species: H. capsincola

Binomial name
- Hadena capsincola (Denis & Schiffermüller, 1775)

Synonyms
- Noctua capsincola Denis & Schiffermüller, [1775]

= Hadena capsincola =

Species of moth

Hadena capsincola is a moth of the family Noctuidae. It was described by Michael Denis and Ignaz Schiffermüller in 1775. It is found from Siberia to central Europe.

The wingspan is 26–34 mm. The ground colour is black brownish. There are one to three generations per year.

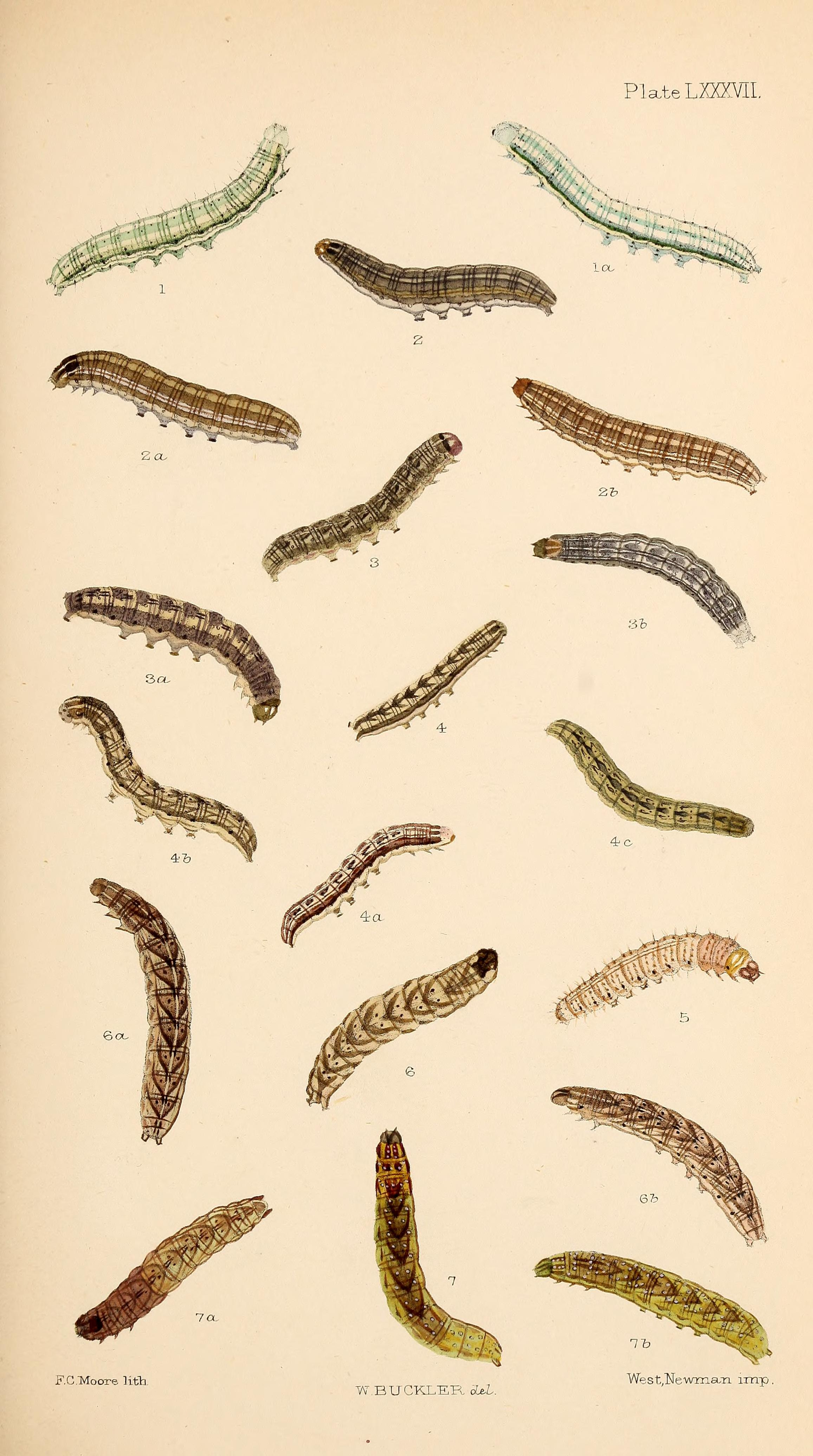
Figs.6,6a,6b larvae after final moult

The larvae feed on Silene species, including S. vulgaris and S. alba. The species overwinters in the pupal stage.

== Taxonomy ==
Hadena capsincola was previously treated as a synonym of Hadena bicruris.
