= H. sancta =

H. sancta may refer to:

- Halcyon sancta, a synonym of Todiramphus sanctus, the sacred kingfisher
- Hadena sancta, a species of moth
