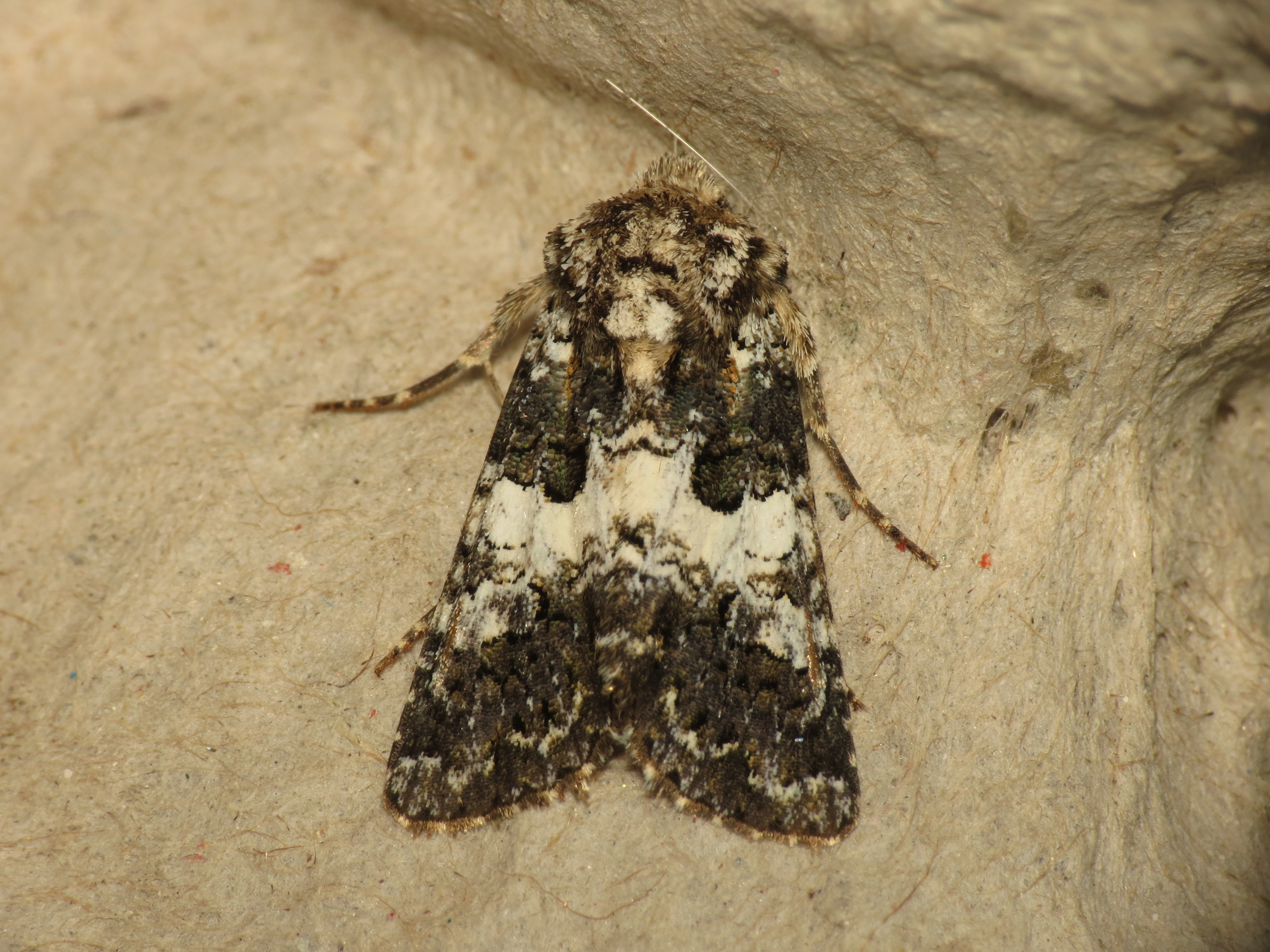
- Hadena compta

Scientific classification
- Kingdom: Animalia
- Phylum: Arthropoda
- Class: Insecta
- Order: Lepidoptera
- Superfamily: Noctuoidea
- Family: Noctuidae
- Subfamily: Noctuinae
- Tribe: Hadenini
- Genus: Hadena; Schrank, 1802

Type species
- Noctua capsincola Denis & Schiffermüller, 1775

Synonyms
- Enterpia Guenée, 1850; Kuruschia Boursin, 1940; Miselia Ochsenheimer, 1816; Zeteolyga Billberg, 1820

= Hadena =

Genus of moths

Hadena is a genus of moths of the family Noctuidae erected by Franz von Paula Schrank in 1802. About fifteen species are native to North America, while over one-hundred are distributed in the Palearctic realm.

== Description ==
Their eyes are hairy. Palpi upturned and clothed with long hairs. Third joint short. Antennae of male ciliated. Thorax squarely scaled and flattened. Abdomen with dorsal tufts on proximal segments. Tibia lack spines. Wings are short and broad. Hindwings with veins 3 and 4 from cell or on a very short stalk.

== Ecology ==
Hadena larvae often feed on the seeds of plants in the family Caryophyllaceae, the pinks, and some of the adult moths are pollinators of Silene species. Hadena moths have hairy eyes.

There are about 143 to 149 species in the genus.

Zeteolyga was a genus of moths of the family Noctuidae; it is now considered to be a synonym of Hadena.

== Species ==
- Hadena aberrans (Eversmann, 1856)
- Hadena adriana (Schawerda, 1921)
- Hadena afghana (Brandt, 1947)
- Hadena alba (Vallantin, 1893)
- Hadena albertii Hacker, 1996
- Hadena albimacula (Borkhausen, 1792) – white spot
- Hadena amabilis (Barnes & McDunnough, 1918)
- Hadena archaica Hacker, 1996
- Hadena atlantica (Hampson, 1905)
- Hadena aureomixta (Draudt, 1934)
- Hadena avempacei (Tams, 1925)
- Hadena azorica Meyer & Fibiger, 2002
- Hadena bactriana Hacker, 1996
- Hadena badakhshana Hacker, 1996
- Hadena bicruris (Hufnagel, 1766) – lychnis
- Hadena caelestis Troubridge & Crabo, 2002
- Hadena caesia (Denis & Schiffermüller, 1775) – the grey
- Hadena cailinita (Draudt, 1934)
- Hadena canescens (Brandt, 1947)
- Hadena cappadocia Hacker, 1987
- Hadena capsincola (Denis & Schiffermüller, 1775)
- Hadena capsularis (Guenée, 1852)
- Hadena cavalla Pinker, 1980
- Hadena christophi (Möschler, 1862)
- Hadena chrysocyanea Boursin, 1961
- Hadena chrysographa Hacker, 1996
- Hadena cimelia (Brandt, 1938)
- Hadena circumvadis (Smith, 1902)
- Hadena clara (Staudinger, 1901)
- Hadena compta (Denis & Schiffermüller, 1775) – varied coronet
- Hadena confucii (Draudt, 1950)
- Hadena confusa (Hufnagel, 1766) – marbled coronet
- Hadena consparcatoides (Schawerda, 1928)
- Hadena corrupta (Herz, 1898)
- Hadena danilewskyi Hacker, 1996
- Hadena defreinai Hacker, Kuhna & Gross, 1986
- Hadena dianthoecioides (Boursin, 1940)
- Hadena difficilis Hacker, 1996
- Hadena draudti (Brandt, 1938)
- Hadena drenowskii (Rebel, 1930)
- Hadena dsungarica Hacker, 1996
- Hadena duercki (Draudt, 1934)
- Hadena ectrapela (Smith, 1898) (syn. H. jola (Barnes & Benjamin, 1924))
- Hadena ectypa (Morrison, 1875)
- Hadena elbursica Hacker, 1996
- Hadena esopis (Druce, 1889)
- Hadena esperi Hacker, 1992
- Hadena eximia (Staudinger, 1895)
- Hadena femina Hacker, 1996
- Hadena fibigeri Hacker, 1996
- Hadena filograna (Esper, 1788)
- Hadena finitima Hacker, 1996
- Hadena gabrieli Troubridge & Crabo, 2002
- Hadena gandhara Hacker, 1996
- Hadena germaniciae Boursin, 1959
- Hadena glaciata (Grote, 1882)
- Hadena gueneei (Staudinger, 1901)
- Hadena gyulaii Hacker, 1996
- Hadena heringi (Draudt, 1934)
- Hadena hissarica Hacker, 1996
- Hadena hreblayi Hacker, 1996
- Hadena humilis (Christoph, 1893)
- Hadena hyrcanoides Hacker, 1996
- Hadena ignicola (Warren, 1909)
- Hadena inexpectata Varga, 1979
- Hadena intensa Boursin, 1962
- Hadena irregularis (Hufnagel, 1766) – viper's bugloss
- Hadena karagaia (Bang-Haas, 1912)
- Hadena karsholti Hacker, 1996
- Hadena klapperichi Boursin, 1960
- Hadena kurajica Hacker, 1996
- Hadena labecula Zetterstedt, [1839]
- Hadena lafontainei Troubridge & Crabo, 2002
- Hadena lucida (Brandt, 1938)
- Hadena luteocincta (Rambur, 1834)
- Hadena lypra (Püngeler, 1904)
- Hadena maccabei Troubridge & Crabo, 2002
- Hadena macilenta (Brandt, 1947)
- Hadena magnifica Hacker, 1996
- Hadena magnolii (Boisduval, 1829)
- Hadena melanochroa (Staudinger, [1892])
- Hadena mesolampra (Brandt, 1938)
- Hadena minorata (Smith, 1888)
- Hadena miserabilis (Alphéraky, 1892)
- Hadena montana (Brandt, 1941)
- Hadena musculina (Staudinger, [1892])
- Hadena naumanni Hacker, 1996
- Hadena nebulosa Hacker, 1996
- Hadena neglecta Hacker, 1992
- Hadena nekrasovi Hacker, 1996
- Hadena nevadae (Draudt, 1933)
- Hadena nigricata Pinker, 1969
- Hadena niveifera (Hampson, 1906)
- Hadena nobilis Hacker, 1996
- Hadena nuratina Hacker & Klyuchko, 1996
- Hadena orihuela Hacker, 1996
- Hadena paropamisos Hacker, 1992
- Hadena paulula Troubridge & Crabo, 2002
- Hadena perornata (Draudt, 1950)
- Hadena perpetua Hacker, 1996
- Hadena perplexa (Denis & Schiffermüller, 1775) – tawny shears
- Hadena persimilis Hacker, 1996
- Hadena persparcata (Draudt, 1950)
- Hadena pfeifferi (Draudt, 1934)
- Hadena plumasata (Buckett & Bauer, 1967)
- Hadena praetermissa Hacker, 1996
- Hadena pseudoclara Hacker, 1996
- Hadena pseudodealbata Hacker, 1988
- Hadena pseudohyrcana de Freina & Hacker, 1985
- Hadena pumicosa Hacker, 1996
- Hadena pumila (Staudinger, 1878)
- Hadena purpurea Hacker, 1996
- Hadena pygmaea Boursin, 1962
- Hadena quotuma Hacker & Gyulai, 1998
- Hadena rjabovi (Idrisov, 1961)
- Hadena rolleti Lajonquière, 1969
- Hadena ronkayorum Hacker, 1996
- Hadena ruetimeyeri Boursin, 1951
- Hadena salmonea (Draudt, 1934)
- Hadena sancta (Staudinger, 1859)
- Hadena schwingenschussi (Draudt, 1934)
- Hadena scythia Klyuchko & Hacker, 1996
- Hadena secreta Hacker, 1996
- Hadena silenes (Hübner, [1822])
- Hadena silenides (Staudinger, 1895)
- Hadena siskiyou Troubridge & Crabo, 2002
- Hadena sogdiana Hacker, 1996
- Hadena splendida (Draudt, 1950)
- Hadena staudingeri (Draudt, 1934)
- Hadena strouhali Boursin, 1955
- Hadena subhyrcana Hacker, 1996
- Hadena syriaca (Osthelder, 1933)
- Hadena tephrochrysea (Draudt, 1934)
- Hadena tephroleuca (Boisduval, 1833)
- Hadena thecaphaga (Draudt, 1937)
- Hadena thomasi Hacker, 1996
- Hadena tristis (Draudt, 1934)
- Hadena variolata (Smith, 1888)
- Hadena vartianica Hacker, 1996
- Hadena vulcanica (Turati, 1908)
- Hadena vulpecula (Brandt, 1938)
- Hadena wehrlii (Draudt, 1934)
- Hadena weigerti Hacker, 1996
- Hadena wiltshirei (Brandt, 1947)
- Hadena wolfi Hacker, 1992
- Hadena zaprjagaevi Hacker & Nekrasov, 1996

=== Gallery ===
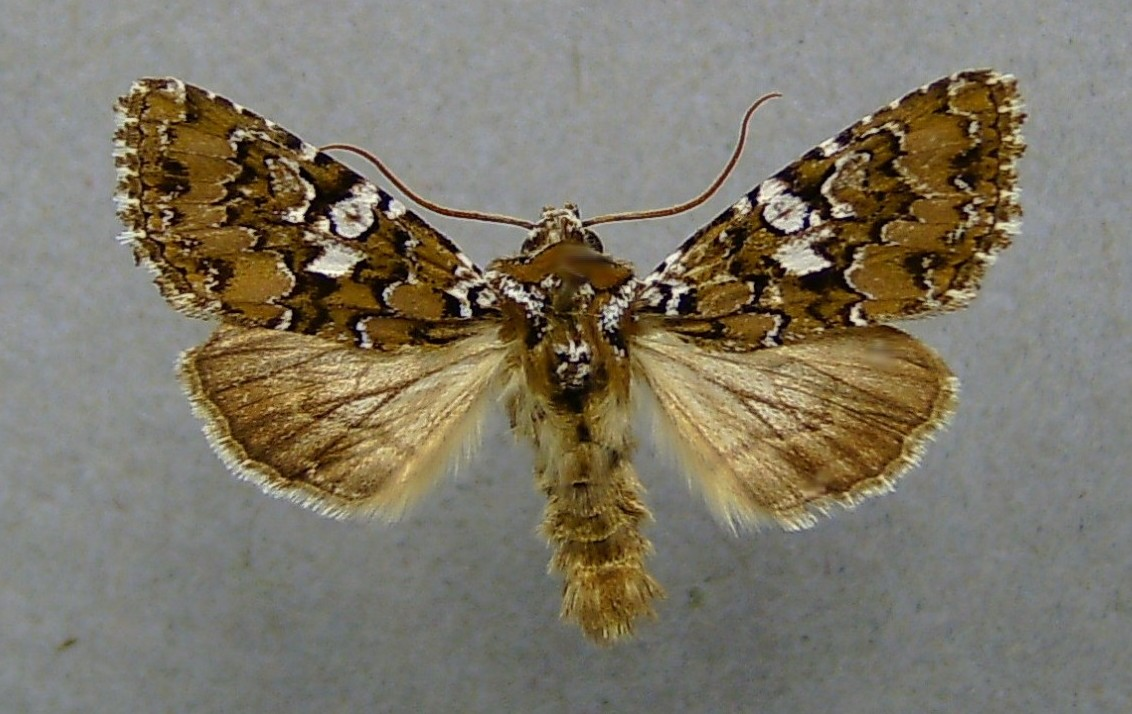
Hadena albimacula

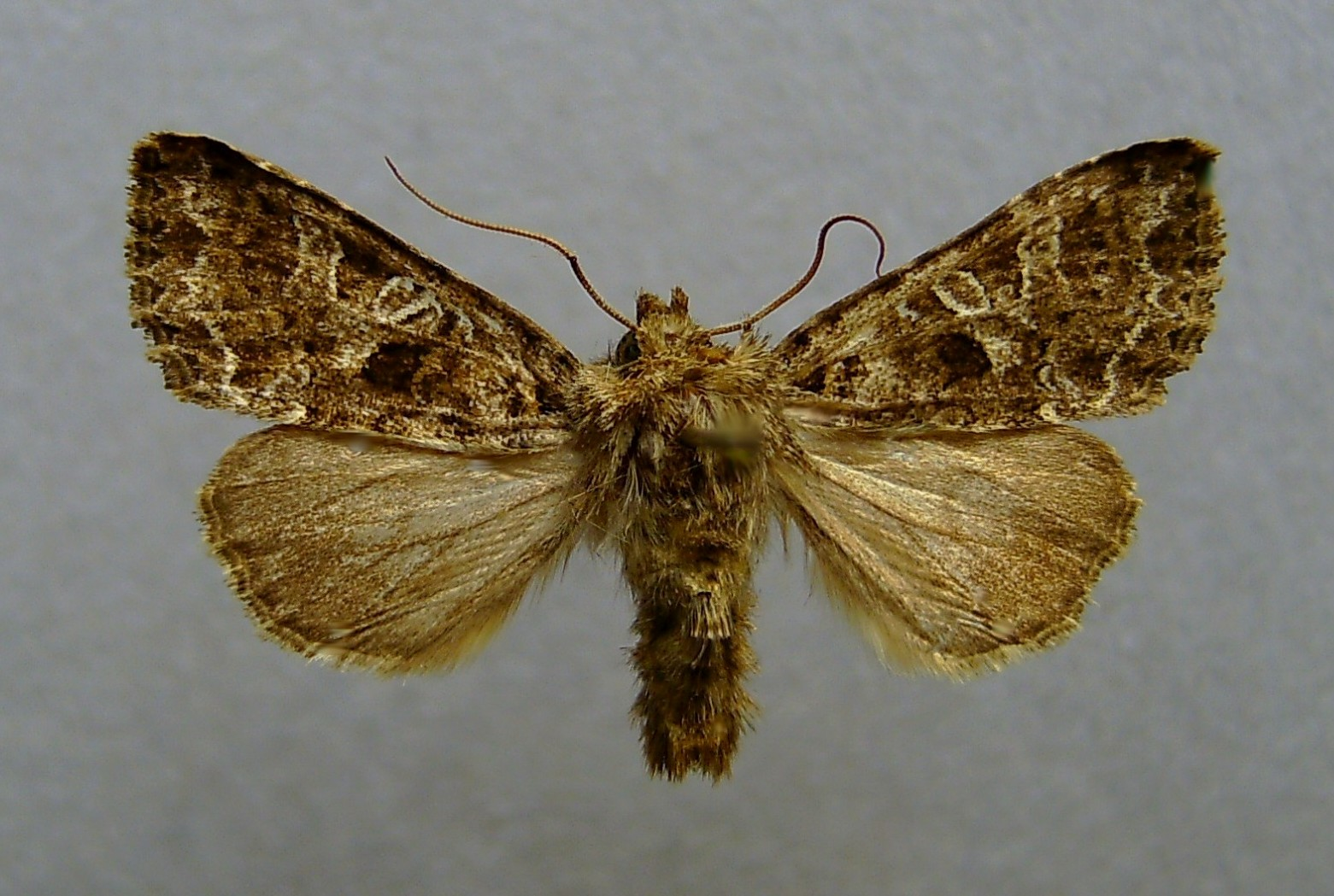
Hadena bicruris

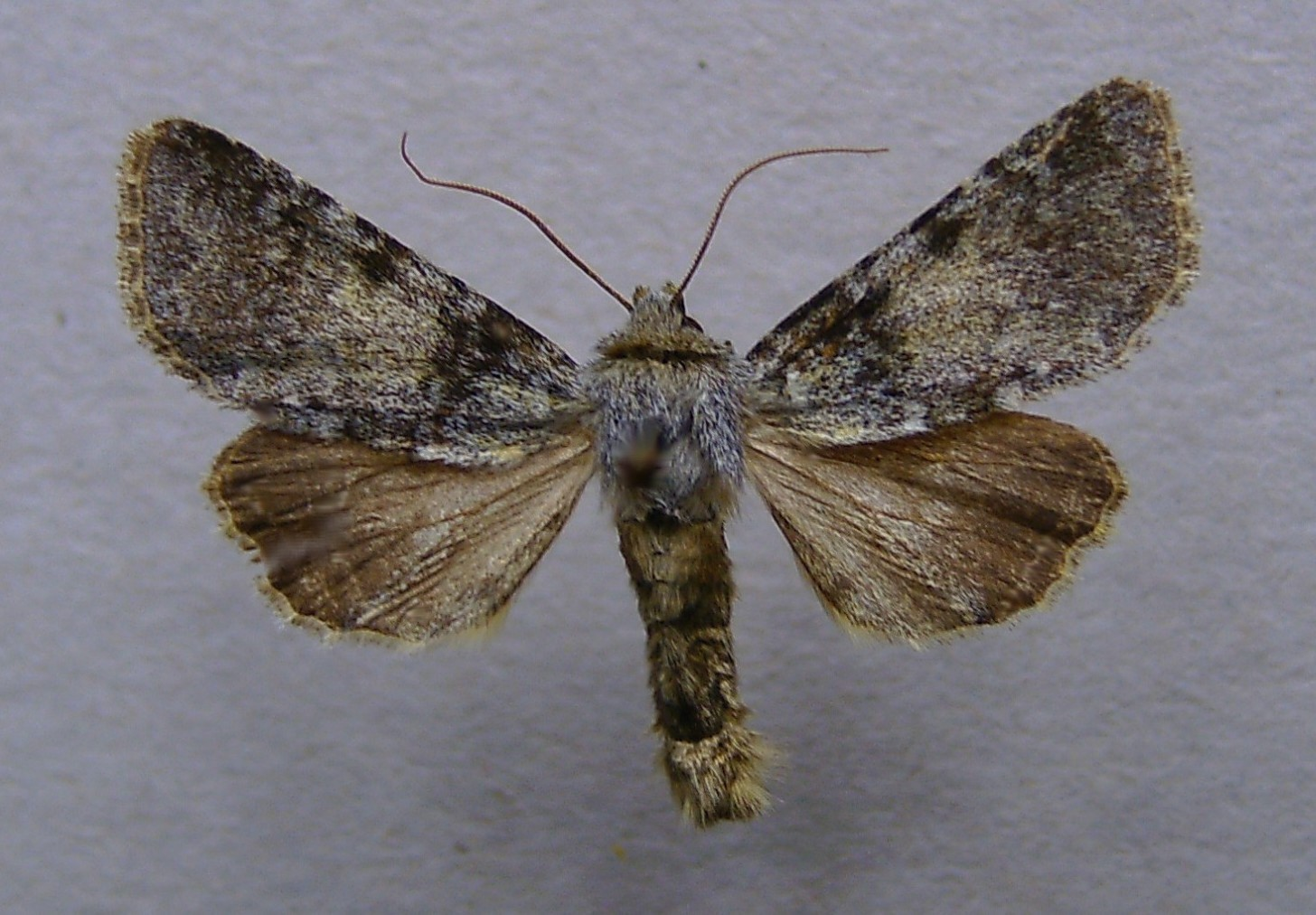
Hadena caesia

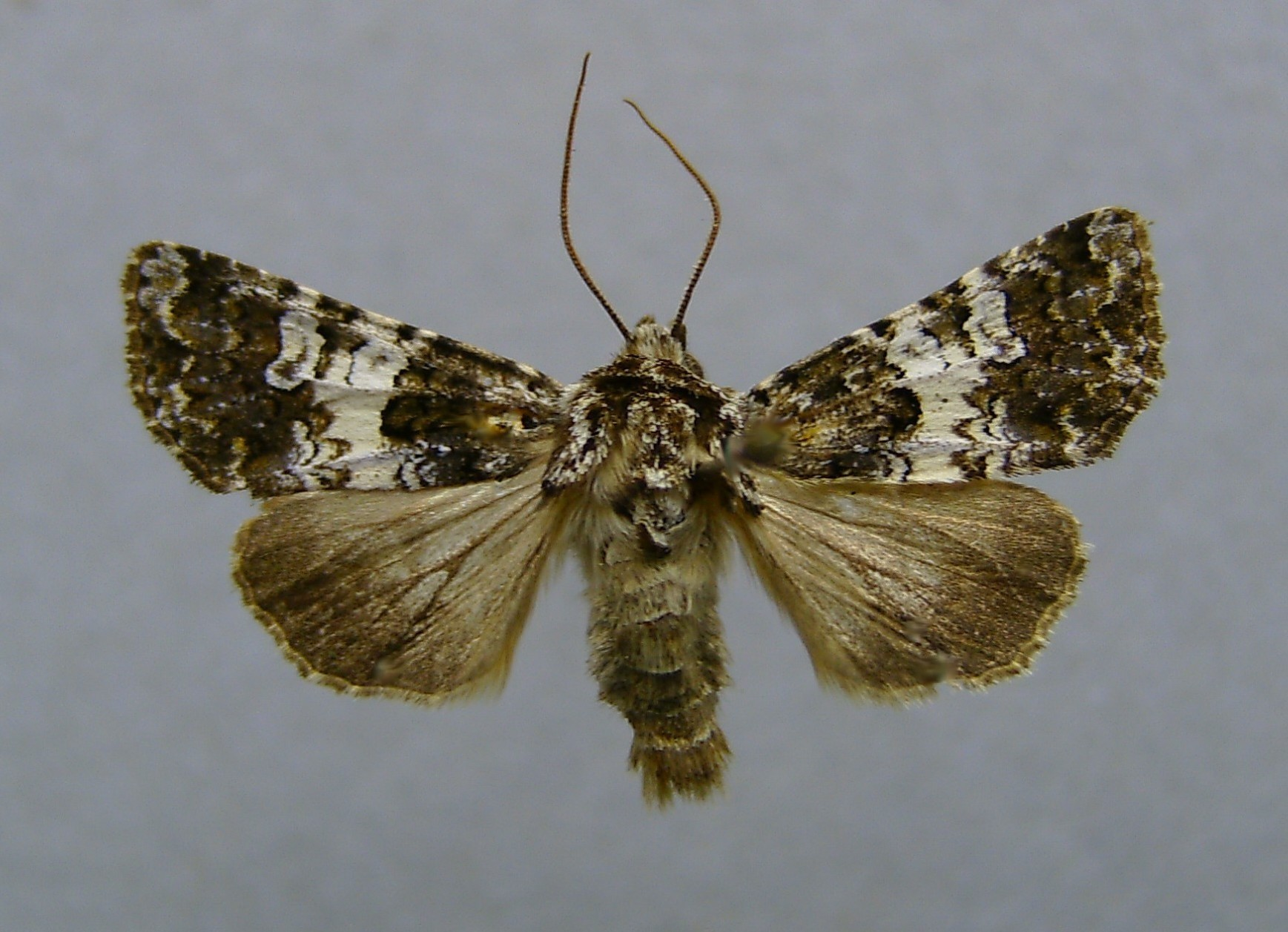
Hadena compta

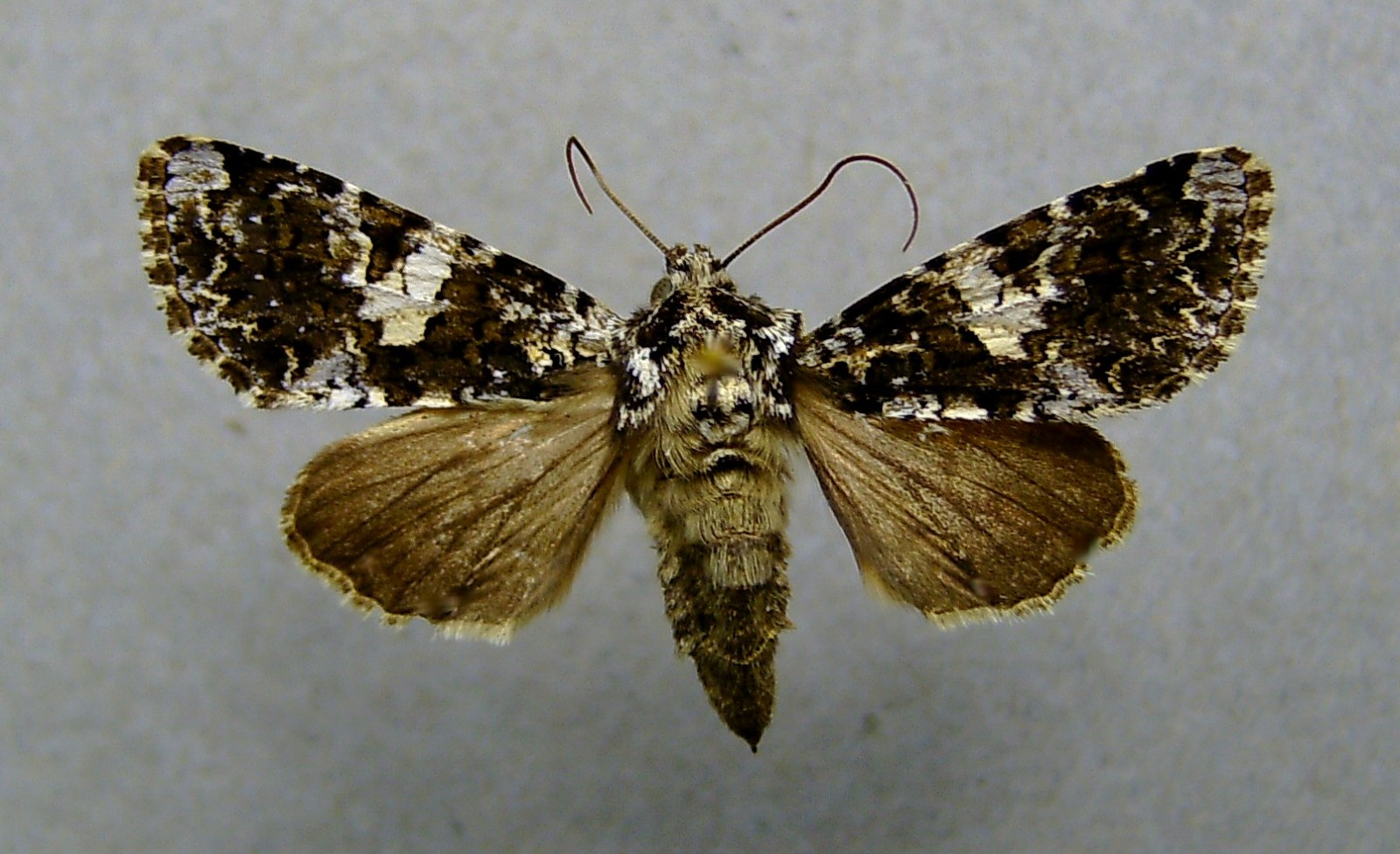
Hadena confusa

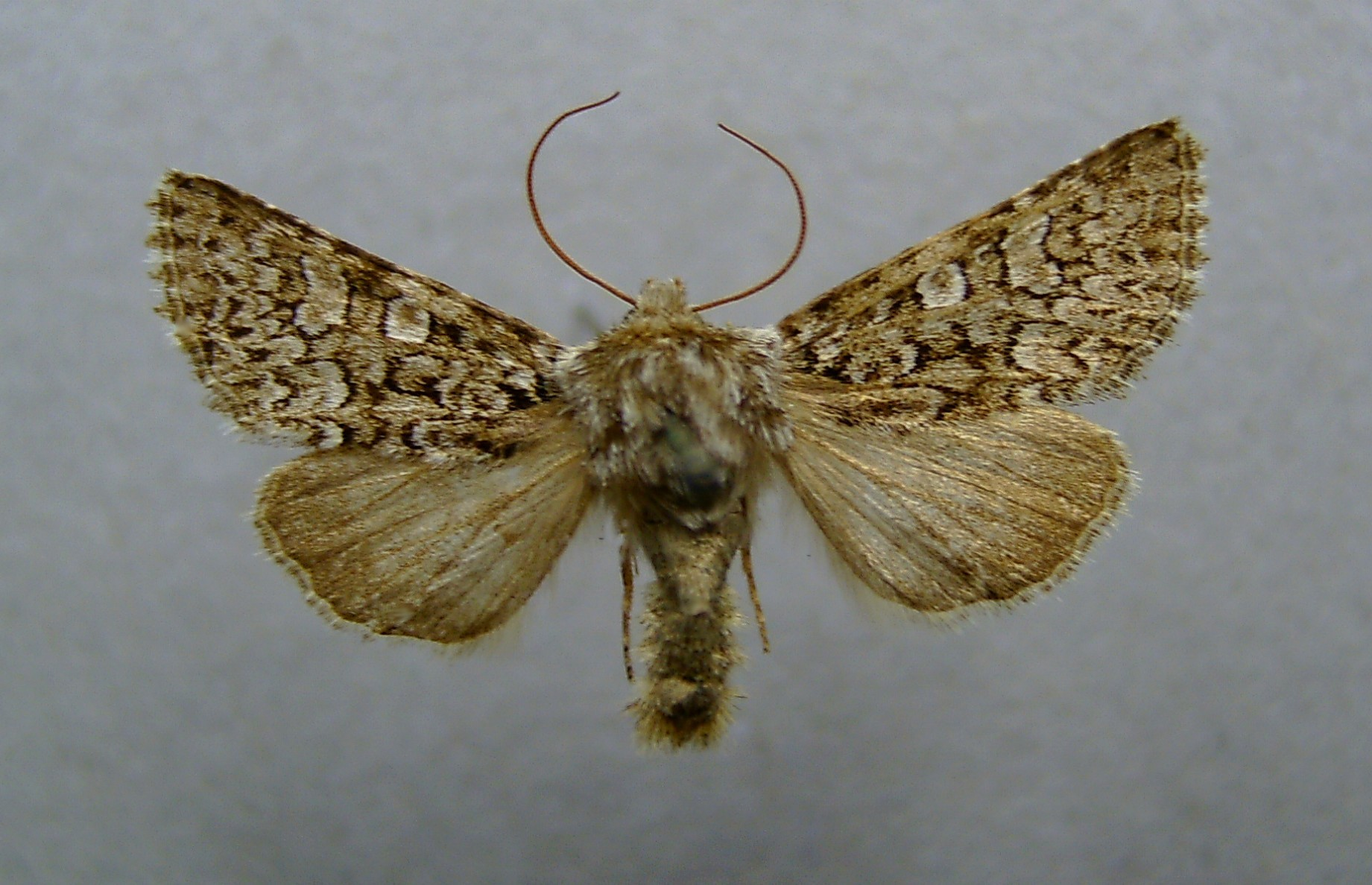
Hadena filograna

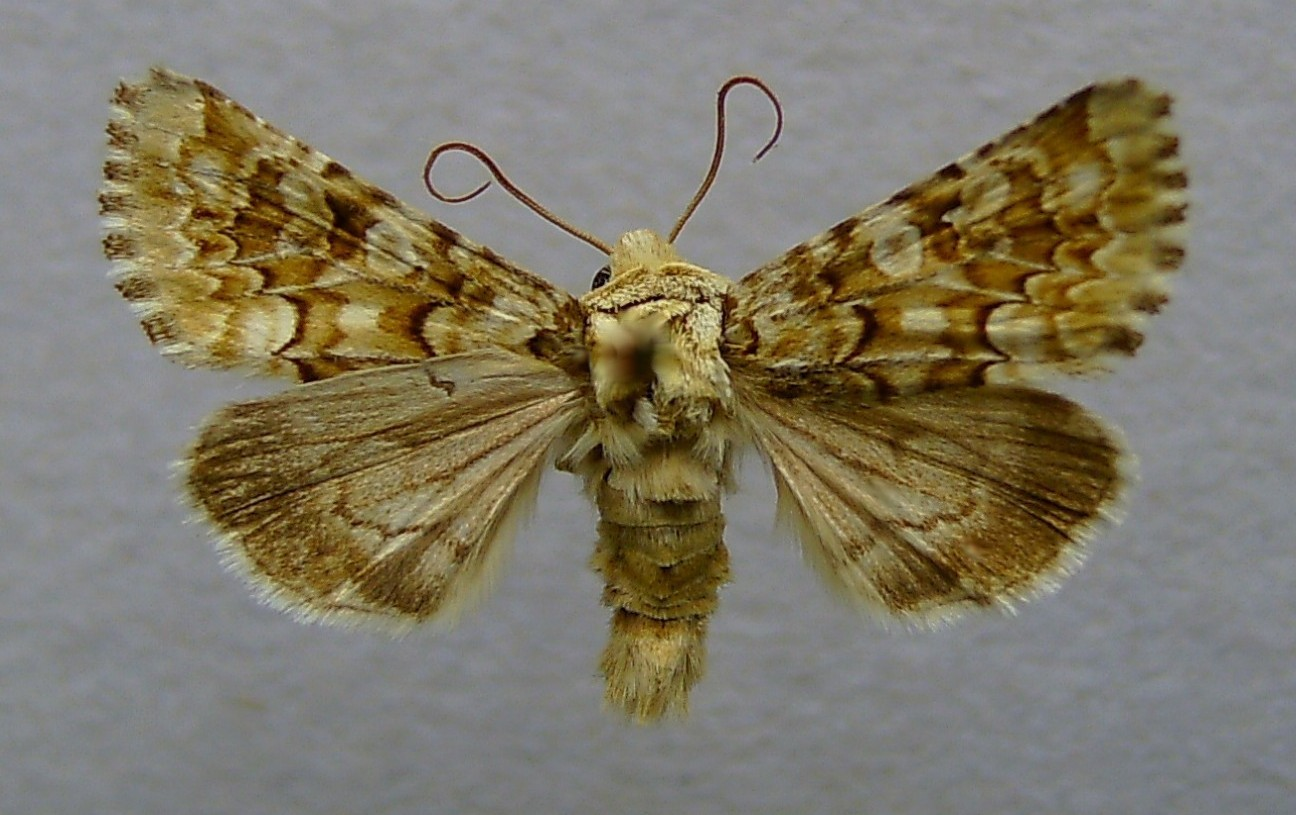
Hadena irregularis

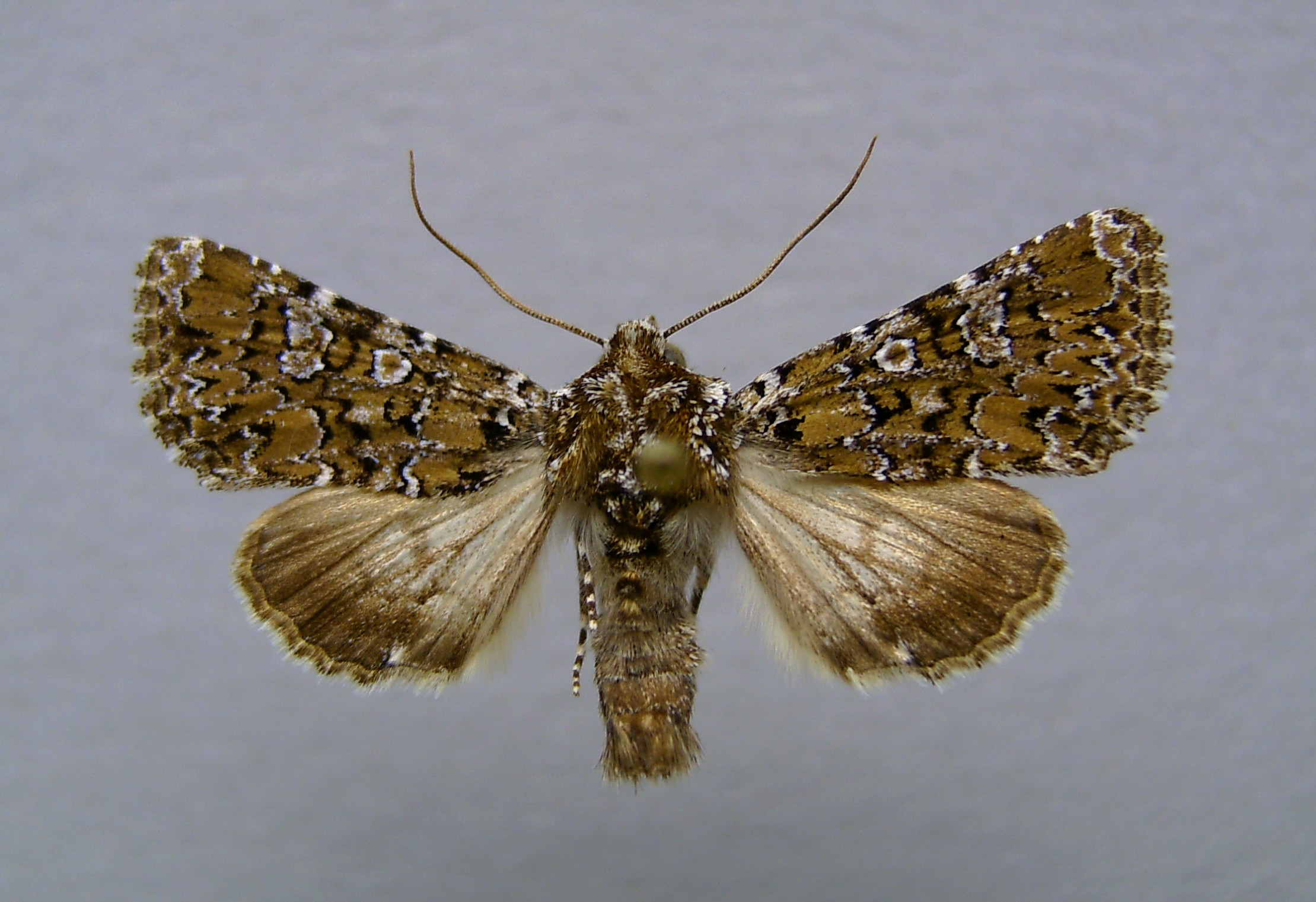
Hadena magnolii

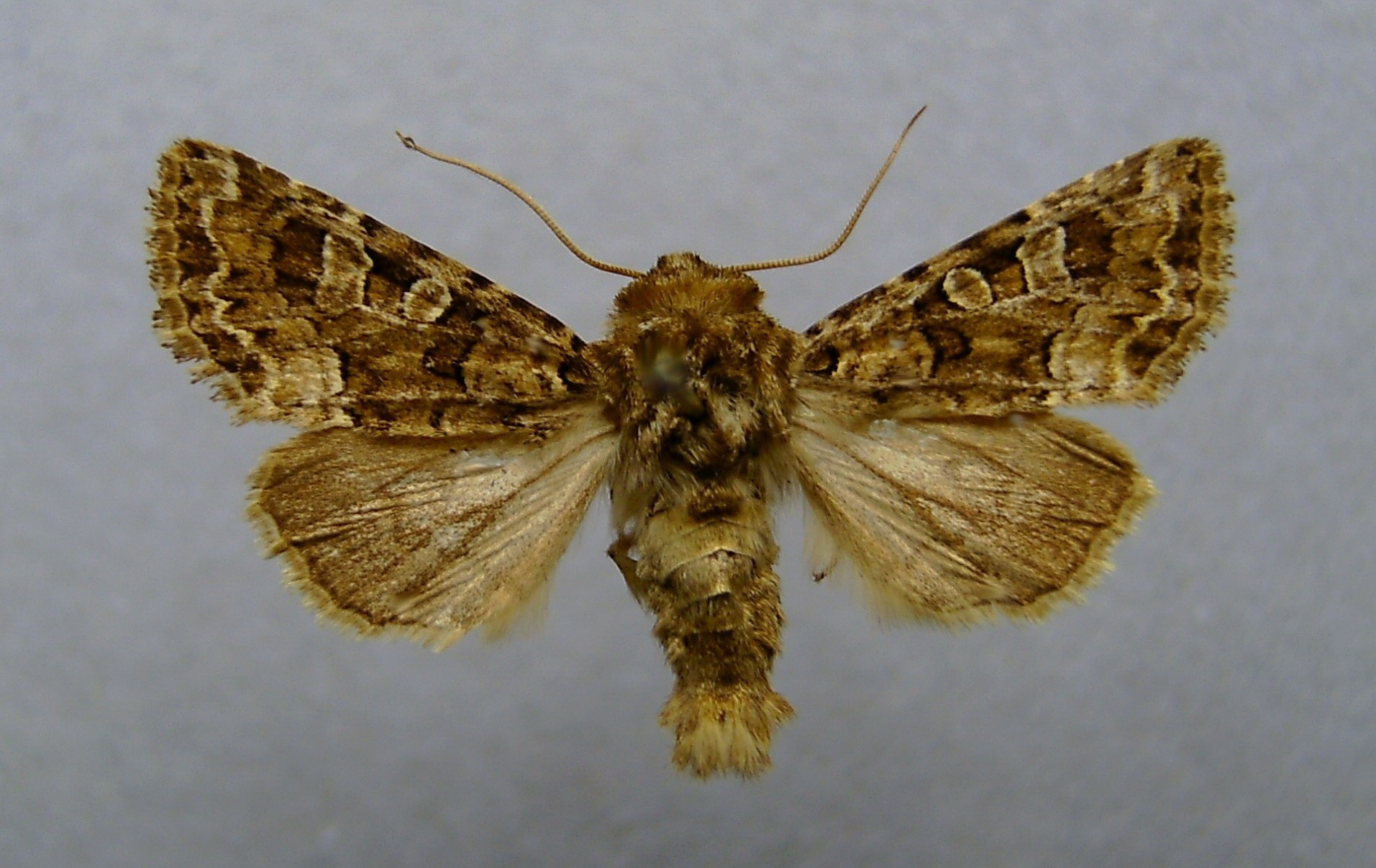
Hadena perplexa
