= Hadena sancta =

Scientific classification
- Domain: Eukaryota
- Kingdom: Animalia
- Phylum: Arthropoda
- Class: Insecta
- Order: Lepidoptera
- Superfamily: Noctuoidea
- Family: Noctuidae
- Genus: Hadena
- Species: H. sancta

Binomial name
- Hadena sancta (Staudinger, 1859)

Synonyms
- Dianthoecia sancta Staudinger, 1859; Hadena protai Berio, 1978; Polia trisagittata Rothschild, 1914; Hadena trisagittata tripolensis Berio, 1978; Hadena trisagittata

Species of moth

Hadena sancta is a species of moth of the family Noctuidae. It is found in Spain, Corsica, Sardinia, Malta, North Africa, Israel, Lebanon, Syria, Jordan, Cyprus, Turkey, Saudi Arabia and Yemen.

== Description ==
Warren states darker and greyer [ than Hadena perplexa as E. nisus Germ. (21 a). Like irregularis, buffgrey brown without the paleochreous tinge; submarginal line dentate and preceded by long dentate black marks; claviform stigma definite but small and brown; hindwing fuscous. The type form is from Sicily only] with the stigmata filled in with brown, occurs in Spain.

== Subspecies ==
- Hadena sancta sancta (Libya, Algeria)
- Hadena sancta protai (Italy)
- Hadena sancta turca (Turkey)
- Hadena sancta cypriaca (Cyprus)
- Hadena sancta atrifusa

== Biology ==
Adults are on wing from March to May in one generation in Israel.

The larvae feed on the seeds of Silene species.
