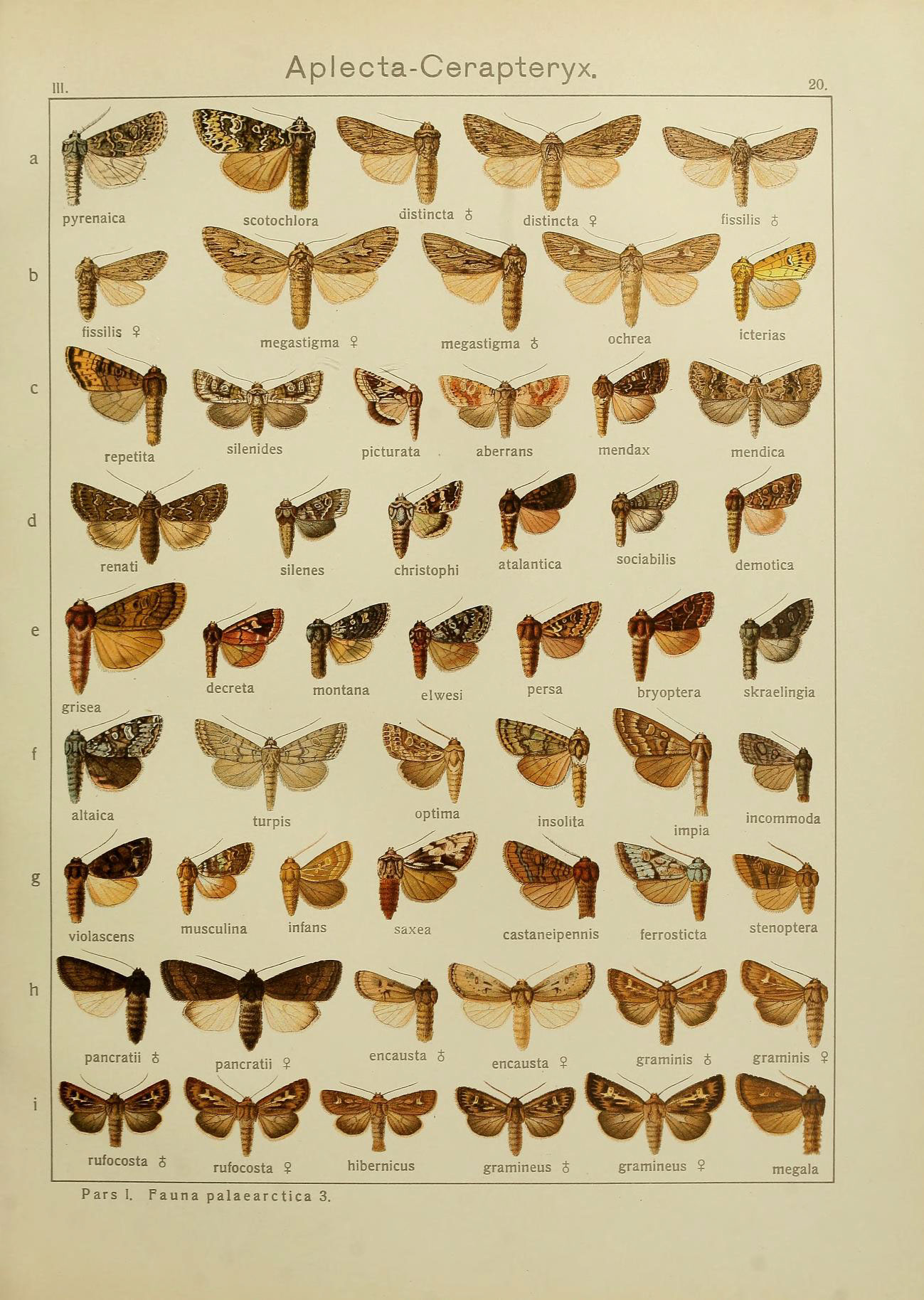
- 20d

Scientific classification
- Kingdom: Animalia
- Phylum: Arthropoda
- Clade: Pancrustacea
- Class: Insecta
- Order: Lepidoptera
- Superfamily: Noctuoidea
- Family: Noctuidae
- Genus: Hadena
- Species: H. silenes

Binomial name
- Hadena silenes (Hübner, 1822)

Synonyms
- Noctua silenes Hübner, [1822]; Dianthoecia sejuncta Herrich-Schäffer, [1850]; Hadena variegata

= Hadena silenes =

Species of moth

Hadena silenes is a species of moth of the family Noctuidae. It is found in Europe, Turkey, Israel, Iran and Turkmenistan.

== Description ==
E. silenes Hbn. ( sejuncta H.-Sch.) (20 d). Forewing ochreous white with redbrown suffusion; claviform stigma black; orbicular and reniform large, their centres brown ringed with white; submarginal line white with black wedge-shaped marks in front of it; hindwing brown, deeper towards termen. — Larva pale redbrown; dorsal and subdorsal lines fine, whitish grey; lateral stripe broad and whitish; spiracles white with black rings; on seeds of various kinds of Silene. A South European species, found in S. France, [Italy], Spain, Sicily, Hungary and Macedonia; also in Armenia, Palestine, and Mesopotamia.

== Subspecies ==
- Hadena silenes silenes
- Hadena silenes variegata (Turkey)
- Hadena silenes mesopotamica
- Hadena silenes csorbai

== Biology ==
Adults are on wing from March to June in one generation in the Near East.

The larvae feed on the seeds of Silene and Cucubalus species.
