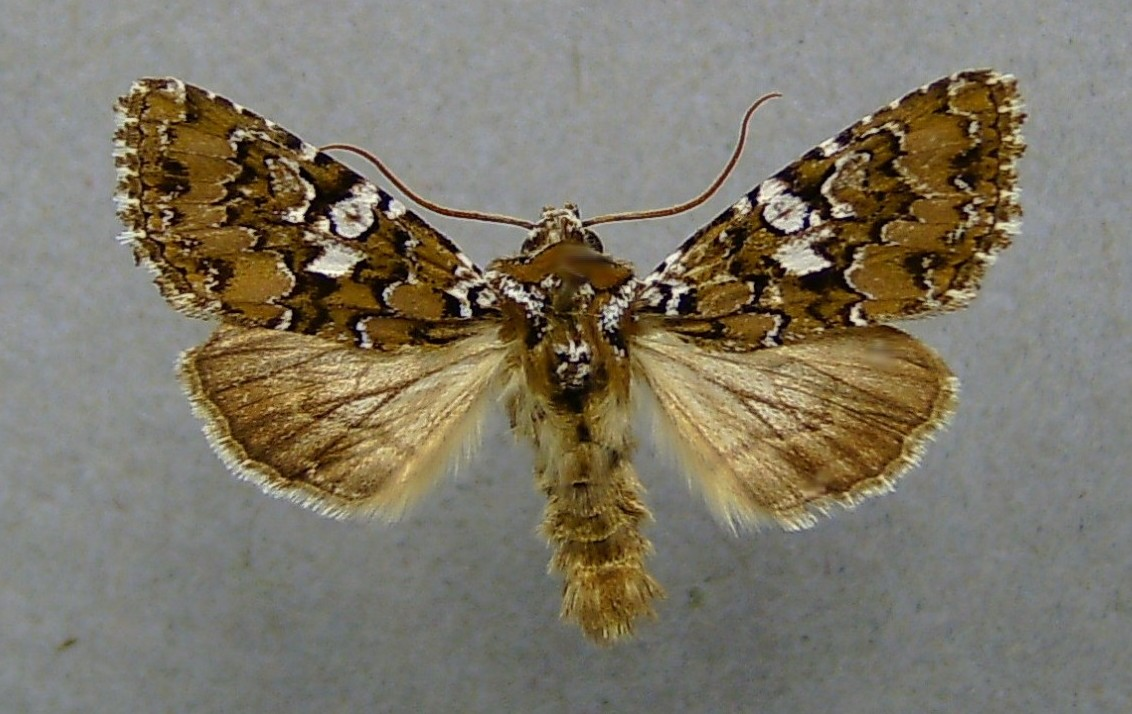

Scientific classification
- Kingdom: Animalia
- Phylum: Arthropoda
- Clade: Pancrustacea
- Class: Insecta
- Order: Lepidoptera
- Superfamily: Noctuoidea
- Family: Noctuidae
- Genus: Hadena
- Species: H. albimacula

Binomial name
- Hadena albimacula Borkhausen, 1792

= Hadena albimacula =

Species of moth

Hadena albimacula, the white spot, is a species of moth of the family Noctuidae. It is found in Europe.

== Technical description and variation ==
The wingspan is 30–38 mm. Forewing olive brown; the lines black, slightly picked out with white scales; claviform stigma of ground colour edged at end with black, followed by a quadrate white blotch; orbicular round and white with slight grey centre; reniform edged internally with white; both outlined with black; small white blotches beyond orbicular and between veins 2 and 3 at base; a whitish blotch at base of costa and a white costal spot above orbicular stigma; hindwing dark fuscous; basal half greyer, with darker veins. — Larva brownish ochreous; dorsal line fine, indistinct, marked by blackish spots which connect the subdorsal oblique stripes; lateral lines pale grey; spiracles white ringed with black.

== Biology ==
The moth flies from May to August depending on the location.

The larvae feed on Silene species.
