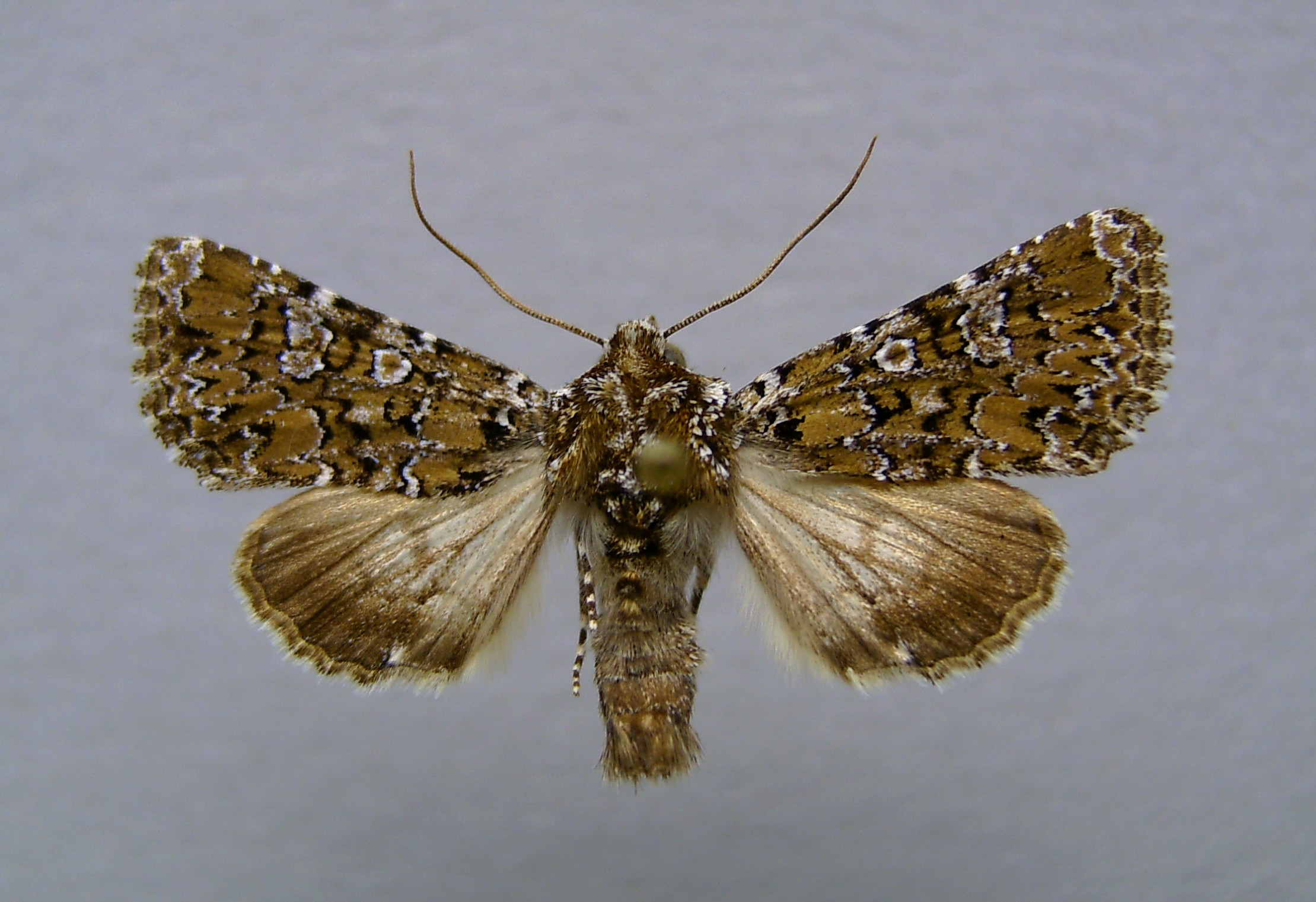

Scientific classification
- Kingdom: Animalia
- Phylum: Arthropoda
- Clade: Pancrustacea
- Class: Insecta
- Order: Lepidoptera
- Superfamily: Noctuoidea
- Family: Noctuidae
- Genus: Hadena
- Species: H. magnolii

Binomial name
- Hadena magnolii (Boisduval, 1829)

Synonyms
- Polia magnolii Boisduval, 1829; Miselia nummosa Eversmann, 1844; Harmodia magnolii f. flavofasciata Draudt, 1934

= Hadena magnolii =

Species of moth

Hadena magnolii is a species of moth of the family Noctuidae. It is found in Morocco, Algeria, south-eastern Europe, Turkey, Israel and Lebanon, Iran, Turkmenistan, Uzbekistan and Kirghizia.

== Description ==
Warren states H. magnolii Bdv. (= nummosa Er., conspurcata H. Sch. ?) (18 e). Forewing olive fuscous, somewhat purplish-tinged, and dusted with white; lines black, edged with bluish-white; claviform stigma of ground colour, edged with black; orbicular round, white-ringed, distinct; reniform less clear, partially white-edged; hindwing fuscous, paler towards base, with dark cellspot and outer lne. Portugal, S. France, Italy, Switzerland, Dalmatia, Austria, Russia; Armenia, Asia Minor, W. Turkestan. Larva greyish yellow, darker at sides; dorsal line dark brown, geminate; the subdorsal stripes dark; lateral line pale; head yellow brown; on Silene nutans.

== Subspecies ==
- Hadena magnolii magnolii
- Hadena magnolii fabiani

== Biology ==
Adults are on wing from May to June. There is one generation per year.

The larvae feed on the flowers and seeds of Silene nutans and other Silene species.
