= Hadena plumasata =

Scientific classification
- Domain: Eukaryota
- Kingdom: Animalia
- Phylum: Arthropoda
- Class: Insecta
- Order: Lepidoptera
- Superfamily: Noctuoidea
- Family: Noctuidae
- Tribe: Hadenini
- Genus: Hadena
- Species: H. plumasata

Binomial name
- Hadena plumasata (Buckett & Bauer, 1967)

Species of moth

Hadena plumasata is a species of cutworm or dart moth in the family Noctuidae. It is found in North America, particularly in California along the eastern slope of the Sierra Nevada, including the species' namesake, Plumas County.

The MONA or Hodges number for Hadena plumasata is 10323.

== Description ==
The moth, whose forewings measure 15-17 mm, is distinguished from other Hadena by its dark, charcoal gray forewings, lack of a basal dash (dash-like marking on the basal area of the forewing), and much less distinctive W-shaped mark along the subterminal line of the forewing.
