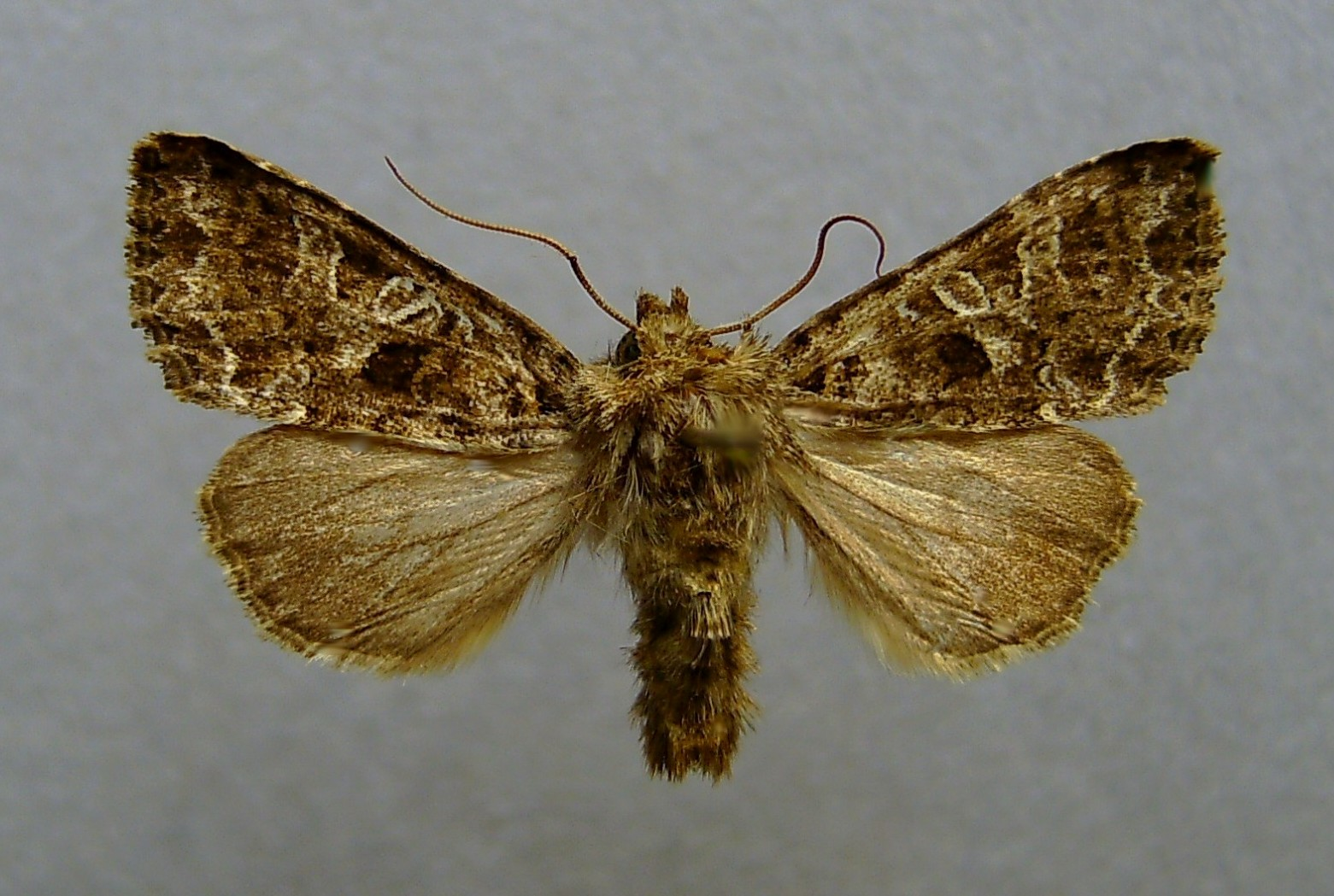

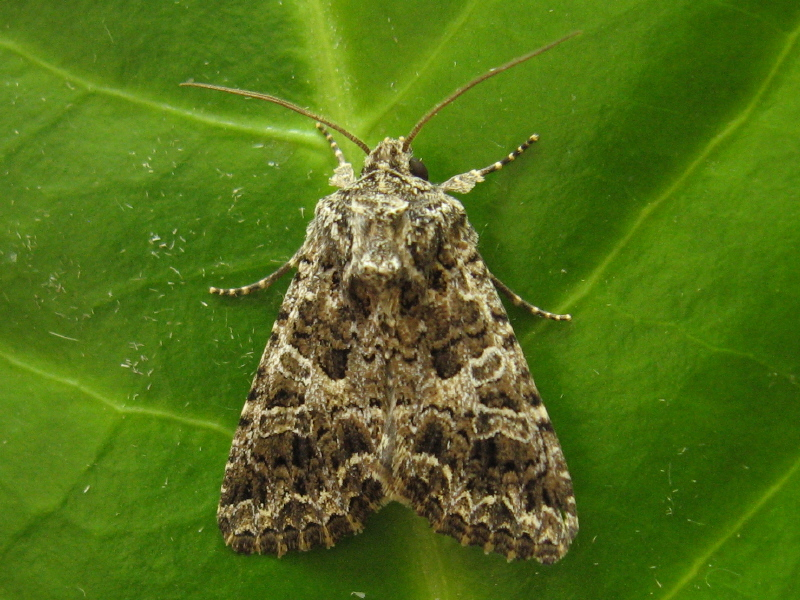

Scientific classification
- Kingdom: Animalia
- Phylum: Arthropoda
- Clade: Pancrustacea
- Class: Insecta
- Order: Lepidoptera
- Superfamily: Noctuoidea
- Family: Noctuidae
- Genus: Hadena
- Species: H. bicruris

Binomial name
- Hadena bicruris Hufnagel, 1766

= Lychnis (moth) =

The lychnis

Species of moth

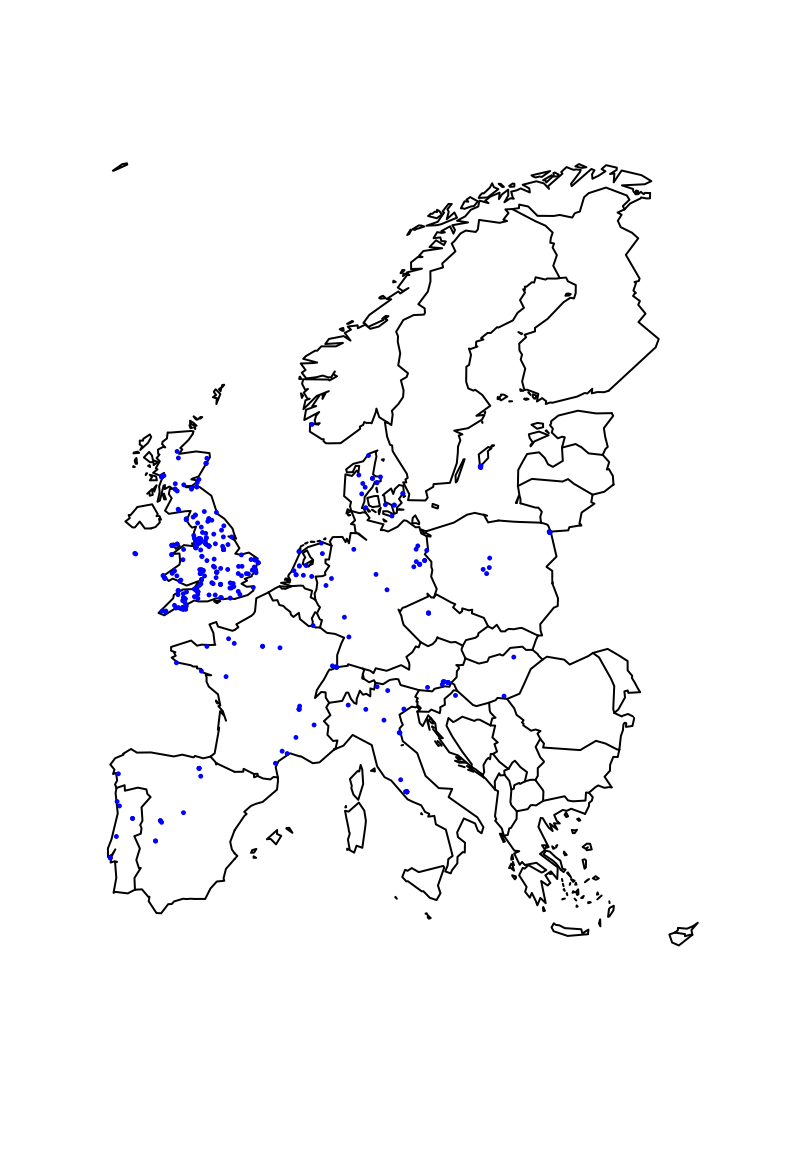
Observations of H. bicruris throughout Europe using data from iNaturalist.

The lychnis (Hadena bicruris) is a moth of the family Noctuidae. It is found in northern and western Europe and Turkey. It has an Atlantic-Mediterranean distribution. In the East Palearctic it is replaced by Hadena capsincola.

== Description ==
This species has dark brown forewings marked with two prominent white-bordered stigmata and a white subterminal line. The hindwings are buffish, darkening to brown towards the margin but with a prominent white fringe. Seitz states - Distinguished from rivularis F. by the absence of the violet sheen; the markings white instead of yellow; the upper stigmata not conjoined; a conspicuous black blotch above inner margin near base; hindwing fuscous. Larva dull brown, with darker dorsal line and oblique subdorsal streaks.

== Similar species ==
- Hadena capsincola has only been listed as an independent species since 1996 after a reworking of the genus Hadena by Hacker. While H. bicruris is mainly native to Western Europe, H. capsincola is found in eastern regions. It is usually a little darker in colour. However, only a genital morphological examination will distinguish them reliably.
- Hadena perplexa is mainly distinguished by the absence of the blackish spot on the inner edge of the forewings below the ring blemishes. On the other hand, black arrow spots are visible on the wavy line. The moths are usually smaller than those of H. bicruris.

== Biology ==
One or two broods are produced each year and adults can be seen between May and September. Flight is from June to July.

The larva feeds on various Caryophyllaceae such as Dianthus, Lychnis, Saponaria and Silene. The species overwinters as a pupa.

== Pollination ==
H. bicruis is a nocturnal pollinator meaning that it frequents flowers late in the day or at night. Flowers pollinated by moths are often pale in colour, allowing for moonlight to be reflected for easy detection by pollinators. H. bicruris has a specialised nursery pollination system with Silene latifolia. Nursery pollination systems are those where female pollinators lay their eggs on flowers, and as offspring develop, they consume either the plant or the developing ovules or seeds. In this type of pollination system the host plant and pollinator, in this case the moth, are dependent on each other. This relationship can also be considered parasitic as offspring consume seeds, which impacts seed dispersal. This system is not as strong as other nursery pollination systems, and that co-pollinators can alter the interaction between H. bicruris and S. latifolia.

H. bicruris lack the specialised pollination structures that many other pollinators have. Instead, pollen granules catch on their bodies and legs when they come into contact with a flower to feed on nectar. This is otherwise known as passive pollination, where organisms have no specialised collecting or depositing behaviour or structures, but still contribute to pollination. When the moth then visits the next flower, pollen granules may be transferred from the body to the stigma of the receiving plant. Despite the lack of specialised pollination structures, H. bicruris are considered to be the most efficient pollinator of S. latifolia, where both sexes contribute equally to pollination. Although there is a cost to plants by seed predation, this will potentially occur following visitation by a female. Compared to when a male visits the plant, he will only consume the nectar and not have any impact to any part of the plants structure. H. bicruris visit both male and female S. latifolia flowers, and show no preference for flower sex. The efficiency of a pollinator is determined by the number of fruit that are produced following a pollination event. Studies have found in S. latifolia that 80% of visits by H. bicruris resulted in fruit production, with 45% of ovules being fertilised after a singular pollination visit.
