= Hadena pumila =

Scientific classification
- Domain: Eukaryota
- Kingdom: Animalia
- Phylum: Arthropoda
- Class: Insecta
- Order: Lepidoptera
- Superfamily: Noctuoidea
- Family: Noctuidae
- Genus: Hadena
- Species: H. pumila

Binomial name
- Hadena pumila (Staudinger, 1879)

Synonyms
- Dianthoecia pumila Staudinger, 1878

Species of moth

Hadena pumila is a species of moth of the family Noctuidae. It is found in Greece, Turkey, Transcaucasia, Israel, Lebanon, Jordan, Syria and Iran.

Adults are on wing from May to July in one generation in Israel.

== Subspecies ==
- Hadena pumila pumila
- Hadena pumila phoenica
