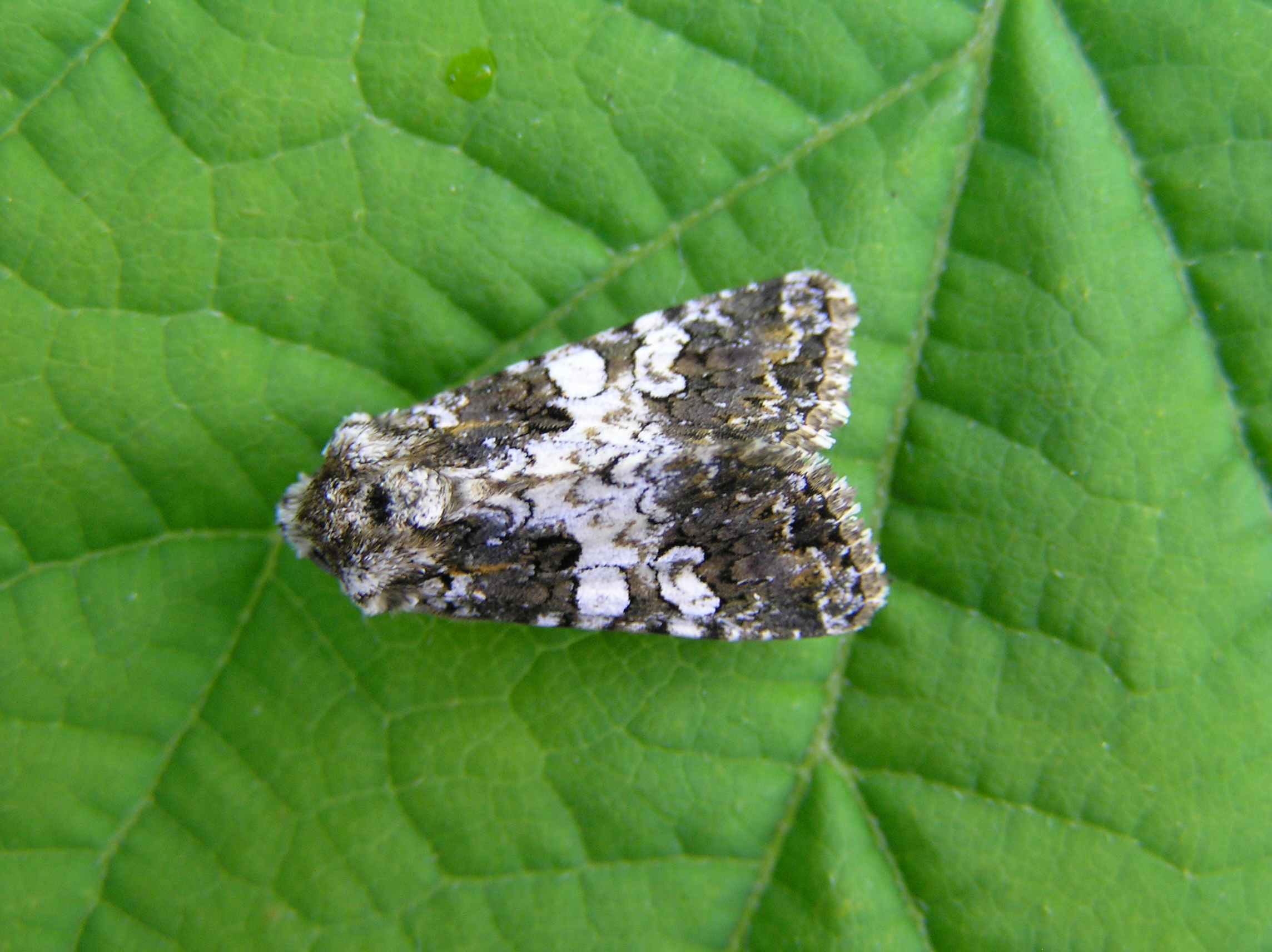

Scientific classification
- Domain: Eukaryota
- Kingdom: Animalia
- Phylum: Arthropoda
- Class: Insecta
- Order: Lepidoptera
- Superfamily: Noctuoidea
- Family: Noctuidae
- Genus: Hadena
- Species: H. compta

Binomial name
- Hadena compta Denis & Schiffermüller, 1775

= Hadena compta =

Varied coronet

Species of moth

Hadena compta, the varied coronet, is a moth of the family Noctuidae. The species was first described by Michael Denis and Ignaz Schiffermüller in 1775. It is found in Europe, Morocco, Algeria, Turkey, Israel, Lebanon, Iraq, Iran, central Asia, southern Russia, China and Japan.

== Technical description and variation ==
The wingspan is 25–30 mm. Seitz describes it: Forewing smaller than nana, with a vertical white fascia, the orbicular stigma, the white blotch beyond claviform and a blotch at middle of inner margin being confluent; no apical white blotch; — in viscariae Guen. the white fascia becomes yellowish or brownish; — humilis Christ [now full species Hadena humilis (Christoph, 1893)], from Armenia and the Taurus Mts., also has the fascia discoloured and much reduced in size, the ground colour often being dull grey. — Larva reddish grey; dorsal stripe redbrown, blotched on each segment and traversed by a conspicuous white central line; lateral lines yellowish; spiracles white on a cloudy grey shade; head redbrown.

== Biology ==
The moth flies from May to July depending on the location.

The larvae feed on Dianthus barbatus and Silene vulgaris.
