= Hadena syriaca =

Scientific classification
- Domain: Eukaryota
- Kingdom: Animalia
- Phylum: Arthropoda
- Class: Insecta
- Order: Lepidoptera
- Superfamily: Noctuoidea
- Family: Noctuidae
- Genus: Hadena
- Species: H. syriaca

Binomial name
- Hadena syriaca (Osthelder, 1933)

Synonyms
- Harmodia lepida syriaca Osthelder, 1933; Dianthoecia osthelderi Draudt, 1933

Species of moth

Hadena syriaca is a species of moth of the family Noctuidae. It is found in Italy, the Balkans, south-eastern Europe, Turkey, Transcaucasia, Israel, Syria and Jordan, Iran, Pakistan and Egypt.

Adults are on wing from February to May. There is one generation per year.

The larvae probably feed on capsules of Caryophyllaceae species.

== Subspecies ==
- Hadena syriaca podolica (Iran)
- Hadena syriaca imitaria
- Hadena syriaca petroffi (Egypt)
- Hadena syriaca quetta
