= Hadena ectrapela =

Scientific classification
- Domain: Eukaryota
- Kingdom: Animalia
- Phylum: Arthropoda
- Class: Insecta
- Order: Lepidoptera
- Superfamily: Noctuoidea
- Family: Noctuidae
- Genus: Hadena
- Species: H. ectrapela

Binomial name
- Hadena ectrapela (Smith, 1898)

Synonyms
- Hadena jola (Barnes & Benjamin, 1924)

Species of moth

Hadena ectrapela is a species of cutworm or dart moth in the family Noctuidae first described by Smith in 1924. It is found in North America.

The MONA or Hodges number for Hadena ectrapela is 10321.
