= Hadena caelestis =

Scientific classification
- Domain: Eukaryota
- Kingdom: Animalia
- Phylum: Arthropoda
- Class: Insecta
- Order: Lepidoptera
- Superfamily: Noctuoidea
- Family: Noctuidae
- Tribe: Hadenini
- Genus: Hadena
- Species: H. caelestis

Binomial name
- Hadena caelestis Troubridge & Crabo, 2002

Species of moth

Hadena caelestis is a species of cutworm or dart moth in the family Noctuidae. It is found in North America.

The MONA or Hodges number for Hadena caelestis is 10322.1.
