= Hadena variolata =

Scientific classification
- Domain: Eukaryota
- Kingdom: Animalia
- Phylum: Arthropoda
- Class: Insecta
- Order: Lepidoptera
- Superfamily: Noctuoidea
- Family: Noctuidae
- Tribe: Hadenini
- Genus: Hadena
- Species: H. variolata

Binomial name
- Hadena variolata (Smith, 1888)

Synonyms
- Mamestra variolata Smith, 1888; Polia variolata (Smith, 1888)

Species of moth

Hadena variolata is a species of cutworm or dart moth in the family Noctuidae. It is found in North America. It was first described by John Bernhardt Smith in 1888 and originally named Mamestra variolata.

The MONA or Hodges number for Hadena variolata is 10326.

== Subspecies ==
These two subspecies belong to the species Hadena variolata:

- Hadena variolata dealbata (Staudinger, 1892)
- Hadena variolata variolata
