= Hadena capsularis =

Scientific classification
- Kingdom: Animalia
- Phylum: Arthropoda
- Class: Insecta
- Order: Lepidoptera
- Superfamily: Noctuoidea
- Family: Noctuidae
- Tribe: Hadenini
- Genus: Hadena
- Species: H. capsularis

Binomial name
- Hadena capsularis (Guenée, 1852)

Species of moth

Hadena capsularis, the capsule moth, is a species of cutworm or dart moth in the family Noctuidae. It is found in North America.

The MONA or Hodges number for Hadena capsularis is 10317.
