= Hadena drenowskii =

Scientific classification
- Domain: Eukaryota
- Kingdom: Animalia
- Phylum: Arthropoda
- Class: Insecta
- Order: Lepidoptera
- Superfamily: Noctuoidea
- Family: Noctuidae
- Genus: Hadena
- Species: H. drenowskii

Binomial name
- Hadena drenowskii (Rebel, 1930)

Synonyms
- Mamestra drenowskii Rebel, 1930

Species of moth

Hadena drenowskii is a species of moth of the family Noctuidae. It is found in the Balkans, Ukraine, Turkey, Armenia, Israel, the Caucasus region, Iran and Turkmenistan.

Adults are on wing from June to August. There is one generation per year.

The larvae probably feed on capsules of Caryophyllaceae species.

== Subspecies ==
- Hadena drenowskii drenowskii
- Hadena drenowskii sultana
- Hadena drenowskii kendevani (northern Iran)
- Hadena drenowskii khorassana (Iran)
- Hadena drenowskii lapidea
