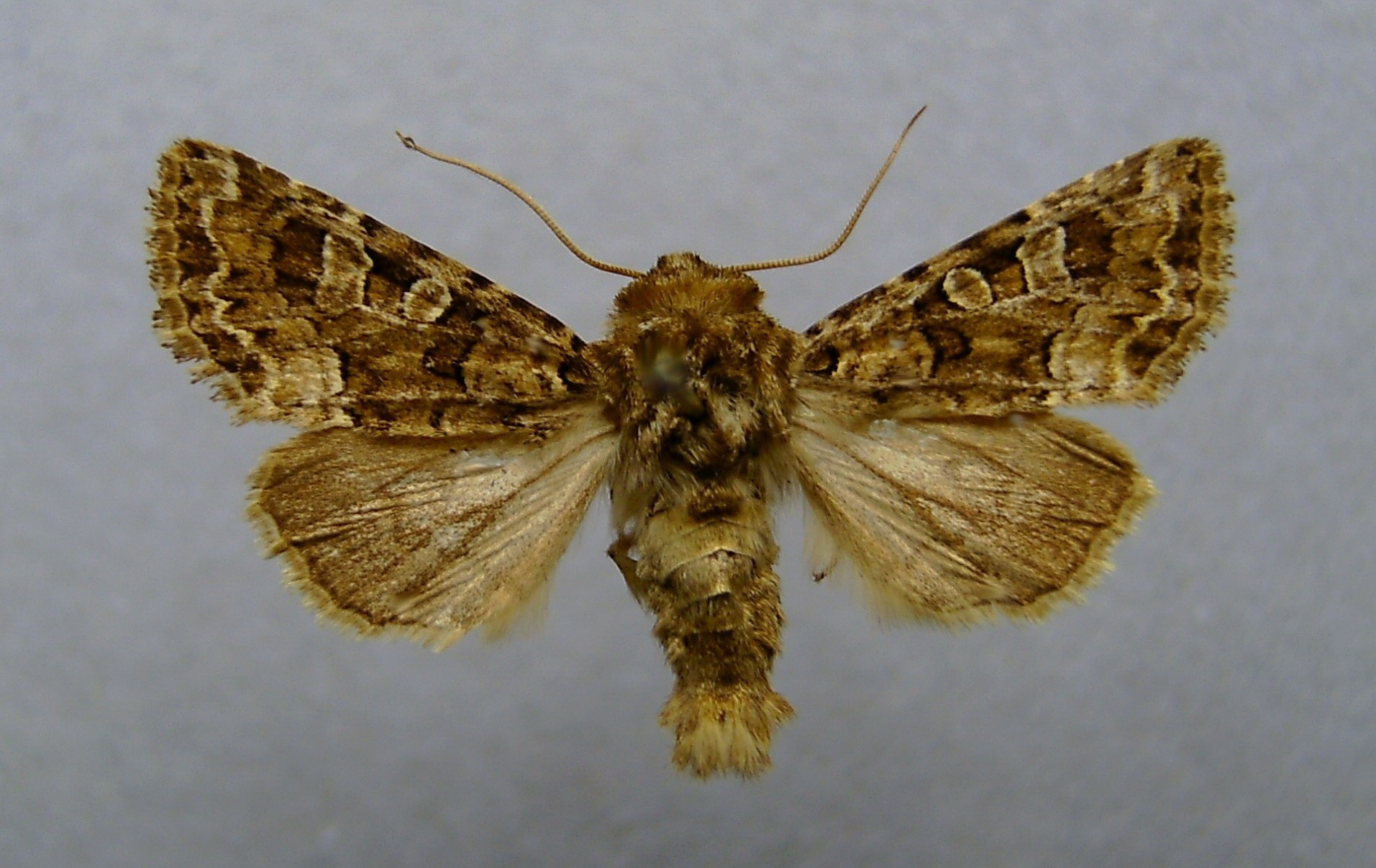

Scientific classification
- Domain: Eukaryota
- Kingdom: Animalia
- Phylum: Arthropoda
- Class: Insecta
- Order: Lepidoptera
- Superfamily: Noctuoidea
- Family: Noctuidae
- Genus: Hadena
- Species: H. perplexa

Binomial name
- Hadena perplexa (Denis & Schiffermüller, 1775)

Synonyms
- List: Anepia perplexa; Noctua perplexa Denis & Schiffermüller, 1775; Phalaena (Noctua) lepida Esper, 1790; Phalaena (Noctua) carpophaga Brahm, 1791; Phalaena (Noctua) carpophaga Borkhausen, 1792; Noctua ochracea Haworth, 1809; Dianthoecia capsophila Duponchel, 1842; Miselia nisus Germar, 1842; Opigena repanda Herrich-Schäffer, 1850; Miselia atlas Prout, 1928; Dianthoecia capsophila f. sicula Draudt, 1933

= Hadena perplexa =

Species of moth

Hadena perplexa, also known as the tawny shears or pod lover, is a species of moth of the family Noctuidae found in Asia, Europe and North Africa. It was first described, in 1775, by the Austrian lepidopterists Michael Denis and Ignaz Schiffermüller from a type specimen found in the Vienna District of Austria.

== Technical description and variation ==
The wingspan is 27–36 mm. Forewing olive grey brown or olive ochreous, clouded with darker; claviform stigma large, dark; orbicular and reniform with brown centres and white rings outlined with black; some black toothlike marks before submarginal line; hindwing dirty grey, darker towards termen; the veins dark. This darker form is the usual one throughout Europe; but is replaced in Britain by ochracea Haw. which is pale ochraceous with slightly darker markings; examples with an actually white ground colour are found on the chalk of the South of England, ab. pallida Tutt on the other hand, the darkest forms of ochracea Haw., with few markings but uniform in coloration, are known as brunnea Tutt.

== Similar species ==
- Hadena bicruris

== Biology ==
Adults are on wing from February to May in one generation in Israel. In Europe flying from April to June, depending on the microclimate of the habitat locality bivoltine, flying from April to June and from August to September.

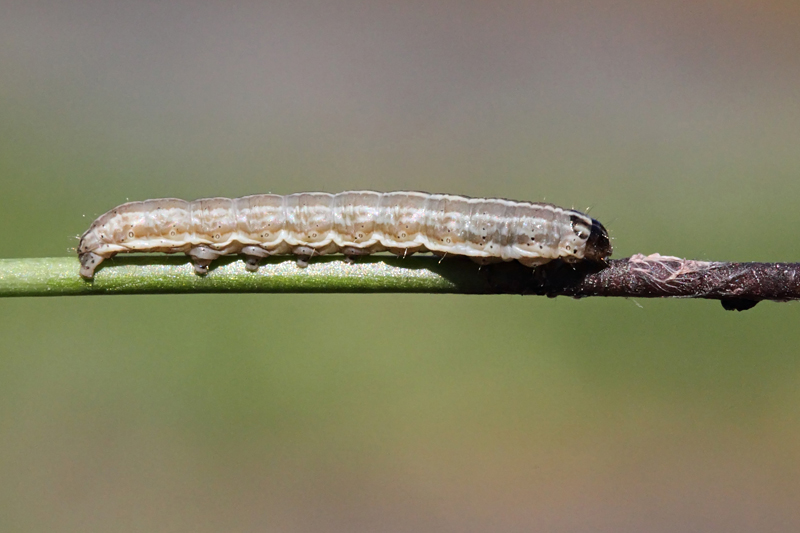
Larva

Larva pale putty colour, with the lines indistinct. The larvae feed on the flowers and seeds of Dianthus and campion (Silene) species. Other recorded food plants include sticky catchfly (Viscaria vulgaris). The larvae pupates just below the surface in a fragile cocoon

=== Subspecies ===
- Hadena perplexa perplexa
- Hadena perplexa paghmana (Afghanistan)
- Hadena perplexa plantei
- Hadena perplexa capsophila

== Distribution ==
The moth has been reported from Africa, Asia and Europe. In North Africa it has been recorded from Morocco, Algeria and Tunisia; in Asia it has been found in Turkey, Israel, Lebanon, Syria, Jordan, Iran, Iraq, northern Asia, Central Asia, northern India and western China and found in all of Europe.
