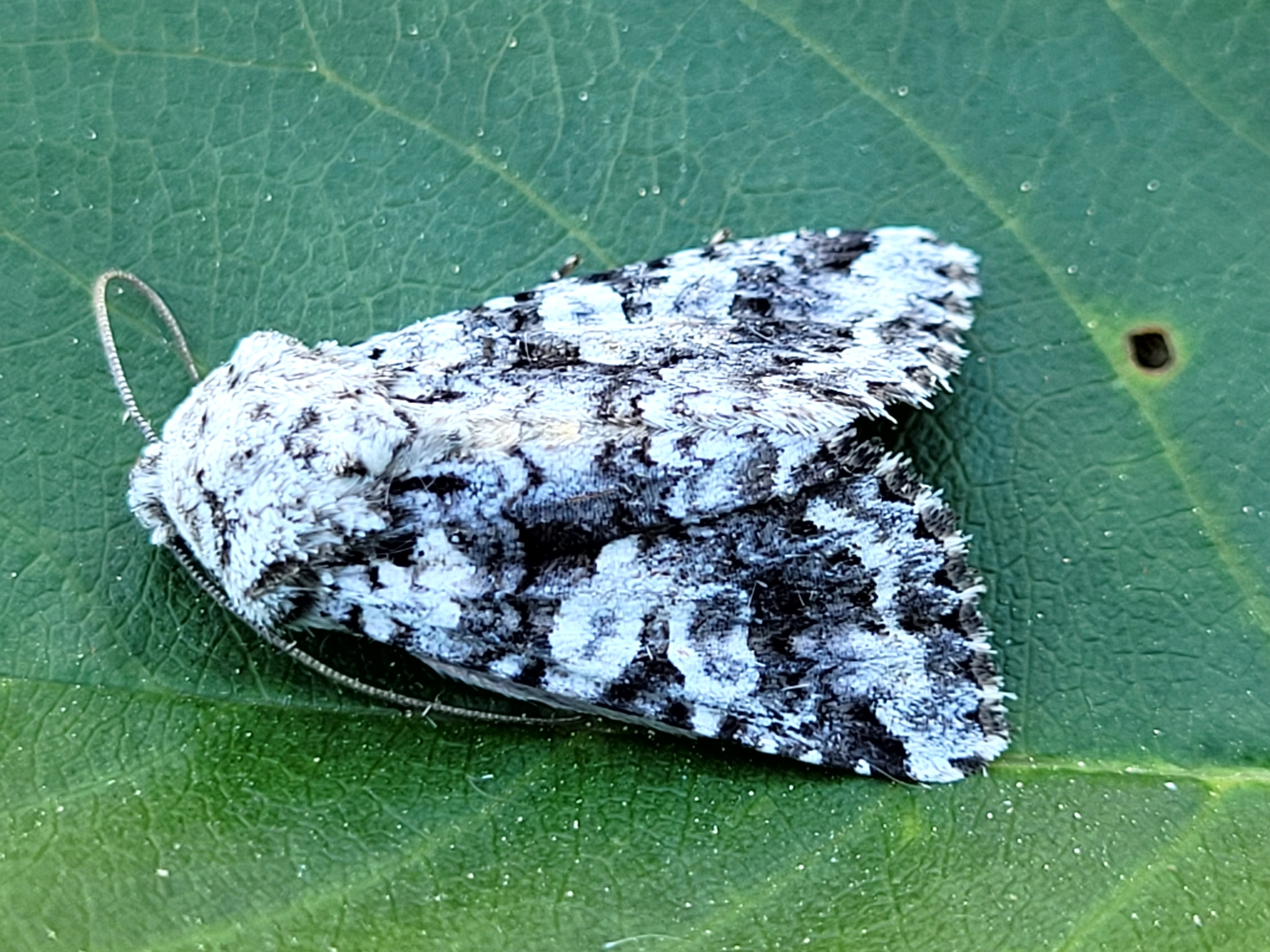

Scientific classification
- Domain: Eukaryota
- Kingdom: Animalia
- Phylum: Arthropoda
- Class: Insecta
- Order: Lepidoptera
- Superfamily: Noctuoidea
- Family: Noctuidae
- Tribe: Hadenini
- Genus: Hadena
- Species: H. circumvadis

Binomial name
- Hadena circumvadis (Smith, 1902)

= Hadena circumvadis =

Species of moth

Hadena circumvadis is a species of cutworm or dart moth in the family Noctuidae. It is found in North America.
