= Hadena gueneei =

Scientific classification
- Domain: Eukaryota
- Kingdom: Animalia
- Phylum: Arthropoda
- Class: Insecta
- Order: Lepidoptera
- Superfamily: Noctuoidea
- Family: Noctuidae
- Genus: Hadena
- Species: H. gueneei

Binomial name
- Hadena gueneei (Staudinger, 1901)

Synonyms
- Dianthoecia gueneei Staudinger, 1901

Species of moth

Hadena gueneei is a species of moth in the family Noctuidae. It is found in Italy, the Balkans, Turkey, Israel, Transcaucasia, Iran and Turkmenistan.

Adults are on wing from May to August. There is one generation per year.

The larvae probably feed on capsules of Caryophyllaceae species.

== Subspecies ==
- Hadena gueneei gueneei
- Hadena gueneei hostilis
