= Hadena silenides =

Scientific classification
- Domain: Eukaryota
- Kingdom: Animalia
- Phylum: Arthropoda
- Class: Insecta
- Order: Lepidoptera
- Superfamily: Noctuoidea
- Family: Noctuidae
- Genus: Hadena
- Species: H. silenides

Binomial name
- Hadena silenides (Staudinger, 1895)

Synonyms
- Mamestra silenides Staudinger, 1895; Dianthoecia cinochrea Chrétien, 1911; Prototestra silenides

Species of moth

Hadena silenides is a species of moth of the family Noctuidae. It is found in Portugal, Spain, from Mauritania to Egypt, Israel, Lebanon, Syria, Jordan, the Arabian Peninsula, Iraq and Iran.

Adults are on wing from January to April in one generation in Israel.
