= Hadena amabilis =

Scientific classification
- Kingdom: Animalia
- Phylum: Arthropoda
- Clade: Pancrustacea
- Class: Insecta
- Order: Lepidoptera
- Superfamily: Noctuoidea
- Family: Noctuidae
- Genus: Hadena
- Species: H. amabilis

Binomial name
- Hadena amabilis (Barnes & McDunnough, 1918)

Synonyms
- Epia amabilis Barnes & McDunnough, 1918; Anepia amabilis

Species of moth

Hadena amabilis is a moth in the family Noctuidae. It was described by William Barnes and James Halliday McDunnough in 1918. It is found in the US state of California.

The wingspan is about 33 mm. Adults have been recorded on wing from May to September.
