= Hadena adriana =

Scientific classification
- Domain: Eukaryota
- Kingdom: Animalia
- Phylum: Arthropoda
- Class: Insecta
- Order: Lepidoptera
- Superfamily: Noctuoidea
- Family: Noctuidae
- Genus: Hadena
- Species: H. adriana

Binomial name
- Hadena adriana (Schawerda, 1921)

Synonyms
- Dianthoecia armeriae r. adriana Schawerda, 1921

Species of moth

Hadena adriana is a species of moth of the family Noctuidae. It is found in Tunisia, southern France, Italy, the Balkans, Turkey, Israel and Lebanon.

Adults are on wing in May. There is one generation per year.

The larvae probably feed on capsules of Caryophyllaceae species.
