= Hadena persimilis =

Scientific classification
- Kingdom: Animalia
- Phylum: Arthropoda
- Class: Insecta
- Order: Lepidoptera
- Superfamily: Noctuoidea
- Family: Noctuidae
- Genus: Hadena
- Species: H. persimilis

Binomial name
- Hadena persimilis Hacker, 1996

Species of moth

Hadena persimilis is a species of moth of the family Noctuidae. It is found in the Balkans, the European part of south-eastern Russia, Ukraine, Turkey, Israel, Armenia, Azerbaijan, Iran, Turkmenistan and Kazakhstan.

Adults are on wing from June to July. There is one generation per year.

The larvae probably feed on capsules of Caryophyllaceae species.

== Subspecies ==
- Hadena persimilis persimilis
- Hadena persimilis balcanica
