= Hadena ectypa =

Scientific classification
- Domain: Eukaryota
- Kingdom: Animalia
- Phylum: Arthropoda
- Class: Insecta
- Order: Lepidoptera
- Superfamily: Noctuoidea
- Family: Noctuidae
- Genus: Hadena
- Species: H. ectypa

Binomial name
- Hadena ectypa (Morrison, 1875)

Species of moth

Hadena ectypa, known generally as the campion coronet or creeping lady's tress, is a species of cutworm or dart moth in the family Noctuidae. It is found in North America.

The MONA or Hodges number for Hadena ectypa is 10316.
