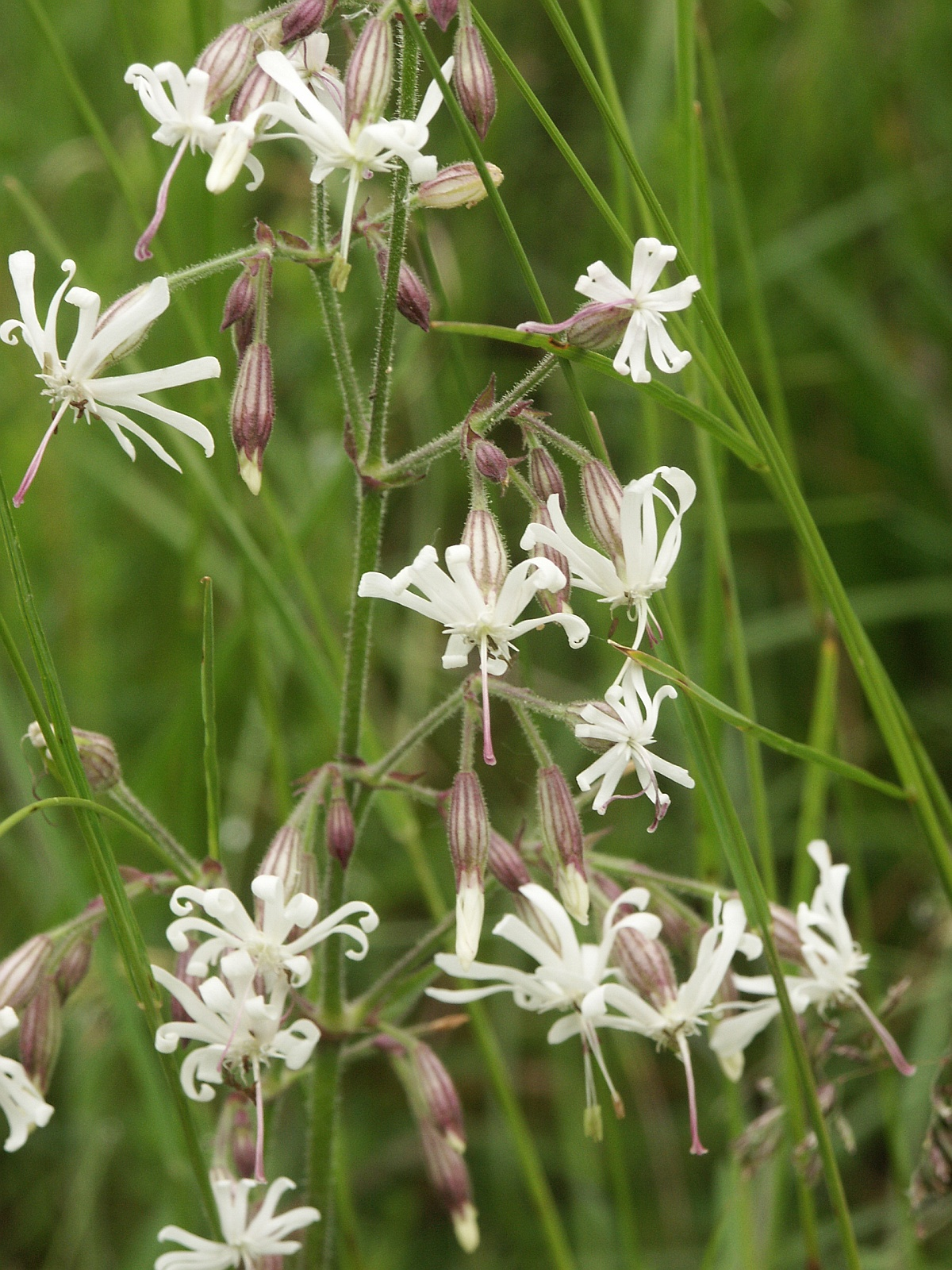

Scientific classification
- Kingdom: Plantae
- Clade: Tracheophytes
- Clade: Angiosperms
- Clade: Eudicots
- Order: Caryophyllales
- Family: Caryophyllaceae
- Genus: Silene
- Species: S. nutans

Binomial name
- Silene nutans L.

Synonyms
- Silene dubia Herbich; Silene glabra Schkuhr; Silene grecescui Gusul; Silene infracta Kit.; Silene insubrica Gaudin; Silene livida Willd.; Silene brachypoda Rouy

= Silene nutans =

Species of flowering plant

Silene nutans is a flowering plant in the genus Silene, most commonly known as Nottingham catchfly.

== Description ==
Silene nutans is a diploid, mainly outcrossing, herbaceous, perennial plant. It grows up to 25–80 centimetres (10–31 in) tall, from a branching, woody stock with a thick taproot. The lower leaves are up to 75 millimetres (3 in) long, spathulate and have a long stalk, while leaves higher on the plant are lanceolate, subsessile and acute; all the leaves are covered in soft hairs. The flowers are 18 millimetres (0.7 in) wide, 12 millimetres (0.5 in) long, and drooping, on short, viscid stalks. The petals are white or pinkish and divided into two narrow lobes. Each flower remains open for three nights as a means of preventing self-fertilisation; the flower reveals one whorl of stamens on the first night, the second whorl of stamens on the second night, and the three styles on the third night. The seeds are 10–22 millimetres (0.4–0.9 in) wide and kidney-shaped.

== Distribution ==
Silene nutans is widespread across Europe, from southern Spain and Italy north to the British Isles and Scandinavia, and is also found across large parts of Asia. It has been introduced to North America, where it is known as the Eurasian catchfly. It is found in the U.S. states of Michigan, Ohio, New York, Vermont and Maine.

Silene nutans can sometimes be found in the very widespread MG1 (Arrhenatherum elatius grassland) community of the British National Vegetation Classification, and thus can be found where Arrhenatherum elatius (false oat grass) or Dactylis glomerata (cocksfoot) occur.

== Ecology ==
Silene nutans is a steppe species across most of its range. At the periphery of its distribution, it has a patchy distribution in xeric habitats, such as open grasslands and on rock outcrops at forest margins, on both acidic and alkaline substrates (pH 3.8–8.0). In the far north of its range, S. nutans is characteristic of maritime cliffs.

Silene nutans flowers during the night, and produces a strong floral scent to attract its pollinators, which are mostly night-flying moths. Chemical compounds in the scent include benzyl acetate and benzaldehyde.

Silene nutans is the host plant for the leaf mining moth Coleophora galbulipennella.

== Nottingham ==
The common name Nottingham catchfly commemorates the former occurrence of S. nutans on the walls of Nottingham Castle, and the species was chosen to represent the unitary authority of Nottingham as its county flower. Despite this association, Nottingham catchflies no longer occur in either the city of Nottingham or the wider county of Nottinghamshire.

Nottingham Castle Trust asked volunteers to grow the plant from seeds supplied to donate the successful plants back to the City to commemorate the re-opening of the renovation of Nottingham Castle.
