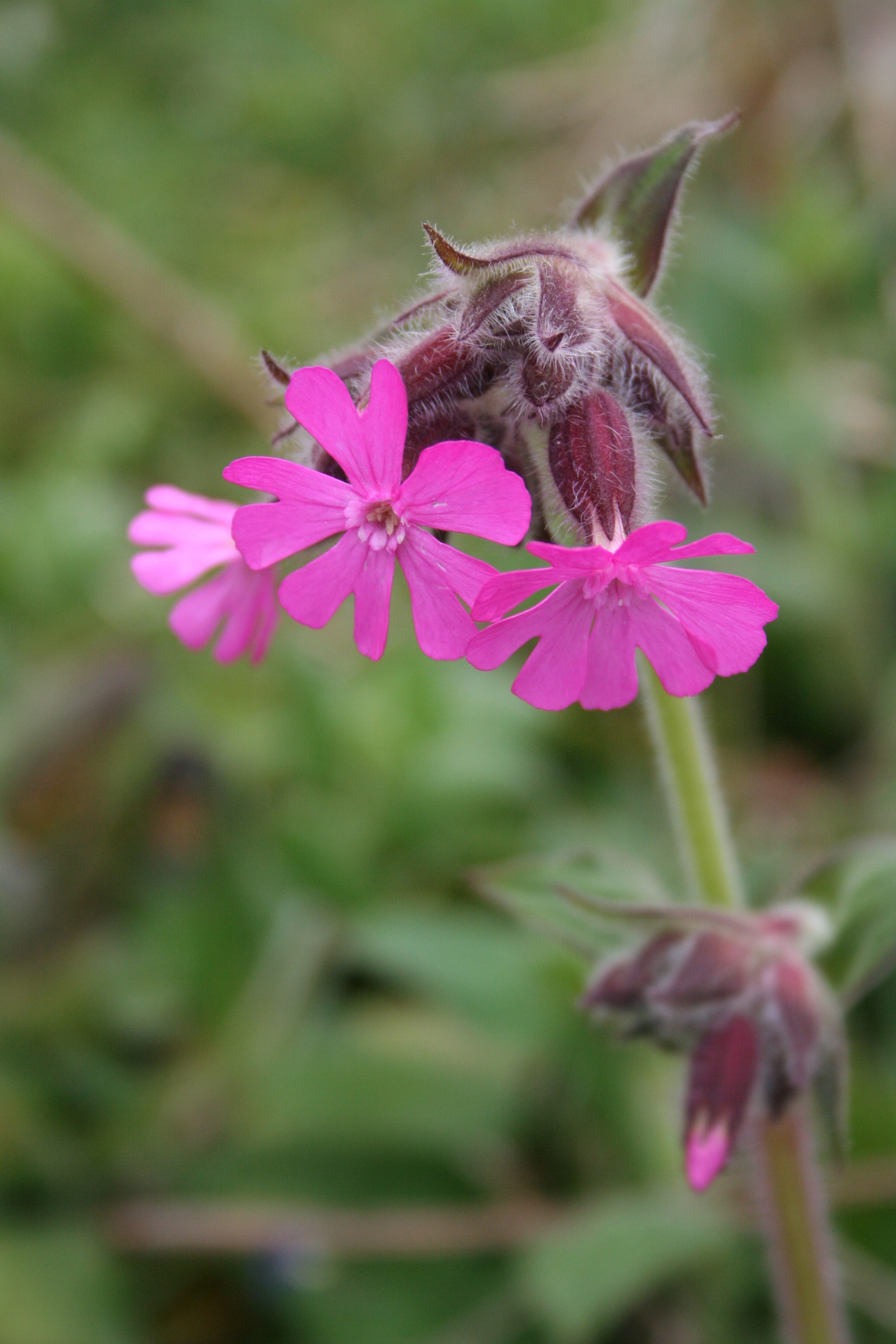
- Silene dioica (red campion)

Scientific classification
- Kingdom: Plantae
- Clade: Tracheophytes
- Clade: Angiosperms
- Clade: Eudicots
- Order: Caryophyllales
- Family: Caryophyllaceae
- Genus: Silene; L.

Species
- See list of Silene species

Synonyms
- List: Acubalus Neck.; Alifiola Raf.; Anotites Greene; Behen Moench; Behenantha Schur; Carpophora Klotzsch; Charesia E.A.Busch; Cheiropetalum Fr. ex Urb.; Coccyganthe (Rchb.) Rchb.; Conosilene Fourr.; × Coromelandrium Graebn.; × Coromelandrum Graebn.; Coronaria Guett.; Corone Hoffmanns. ex Steud.; Cucubalus L.; Diplogama Opiz; Ebraxis Raf.; Elisanthe Rchb.; Evactoma Raf.; Exemix Raf.; Floscuculi Opiz; Flox Adans.; Gastrocalyx Schischk.; Gastrolychnis (Fenzl) Rchb.; Hedona Lour.; Kaleria Adans.; Leptosilene Fourr.; Lychnanthos S.G.Gmel.; Lychnidia Pomel; Lychnis L.; × Lychnisilene Cif. & Giacom.; Melandrium Röhl.; Muscipula Ruppius ex Fourr.; Neoussuria Tzvelev; Oberna Adans.; Oncerum Dulac; Otites Adans.; Peschkovia (Tzvelev) Tzvelev; Petrocoma Rupr.; Petrosilene Fourr.; Physocarpon Neck. ex Raf.; Physolychnis Rupr.; Pleconax Raf.; Polyschemone Schott, Nyman & Kotschy; Schischkiniella Steenis; Scribaea Borkh.; Silenanthe Griseb. & Schenk; Sofianthe Tzvelev; Uebelinia Hochst.; Ussuria Tzvelev; Viscago Zinn; Wahlbergella Fr.; Xamilenis Raf.

= Silene =

Genus of flowering plants

Silene is a genus of flowering plants in the family Caryophyllaceae. Containing between 500 and 900 species, it is the largest genus in the family. Common names include campion and catchfly. Many Silene species are widely distributed, particularly in the northern hemisphere.

== Scientific history ==
Members of this genus have been the subject of research by preeminent plant ecologists, evolutionary biologists, and geneticists, including Charles Darwin, Gregor Mendel, Carl Correns, Herbert G. Baker, and Janis Antonovics. Many Silene species continue to be widely used to study systems, particularly in the fields of ecology and evolutionary biology. The genus has been used as a model for understanding the genetics of sex determination for over a century. Silene species commonly contain a mixture of hermaphroditic and female (or male-sterile) individuals (gynodioecy), and early studies by Correns showed that male sterility could be maternally inherited, an example of what is now known as cytoplasmic male sterility. Two independent groups of species in Silene have evolved separate male and female sexes (dioecy) with chromosomal sex determination that is analogous to the system found in humans and other mammals.

Silene flowers are frequently visited by flies, such as Rhingia campestris. Silene species have also been used to study speciation, host-pathogen interactions, biological species invasions, adaptation to heavy-metal-contaminated soils, metapopulation genetics, and organelle genome evolution. Notably, some members of the genus Silene hold the distinction of harboring the largest mitochondrial genomes ever identified.

== Taxonomy ==
Silene was originally described by Linnaeus. Divisions of the genus into subgenera or sections before 2003 do not seem to be well-supported by molecular evidence.

The genus Lychnis is closely related to (and sometimes included in) Silene. When treated as a distinct genus, it can often be differentiated by the number of flower styles (five in Lychnis' and three in Silene), the number of teeth of the seed capsule (five in Lychnis' and six in Silene), and by the sticky stems of Lychnis.

=== Sexual systems ===
Sexual systems vary across species. Most Silene species are hermaphroditic representing 58.2% of Silene species, 14.3% are dioecious, 13.3% gynodioecious, and 12.2% are both gynodioecious and gynomonoecious. Trioecy, andromonoecy, and gynomonoecy have also been reported but are extremely rare.

=== Etymology ===
Silene is the feminine form of Silenus, an Ancient Greek woodland deity who was a companion and tutor to the wine god Dionysus.

== Ecology ==
Lychnis is also the common name of Hadena bicruris, a species of noctuid moth. The larva of this moth feeds on Silene (formerly Lychnis) species, as do some other Lepidoptera including cabbage moths (recorded on Silene chalcedonica), grey chi and case-bearers of the genus Coleophora including C. albella (feeds exclusively on Silene flos-cuculi).

== Uses ==
Many species of Silene are in cultivation for perennial gardens. Some have gained the Royal Horticultural Society's Award of Garden Merit, including Silene flos-jovis and Silene schafta.

Silene undulata (syn. S. capensis) is known as iindlela zimhlophe ("white paths") by the Xhosa of South Africa. A Xhosa diviner identifies and collects the plant from the wild. The roots are ground, mixed with water, and beaten to a froth, which is consumed by novice diviners during the full moon to influence their dreams. They also take it to prepare for various rituals. The root has such a strong, musky essence that the diviners who consume it exude the scent in their sweat.

Silene vulgaris, or bladder campion, is eaten in some Mediterranean countries. Young leaves may be eaten raw, and mature leaves are boiled, fried, stewed or mixed into dishes such as risotto.

== Fossil record ==
Fossil Silene microsperma seeds from the Chattian stage of the Oligocene have been found in the Oberleichtersbach Formation in the Rhön Mountains of central Germany.
