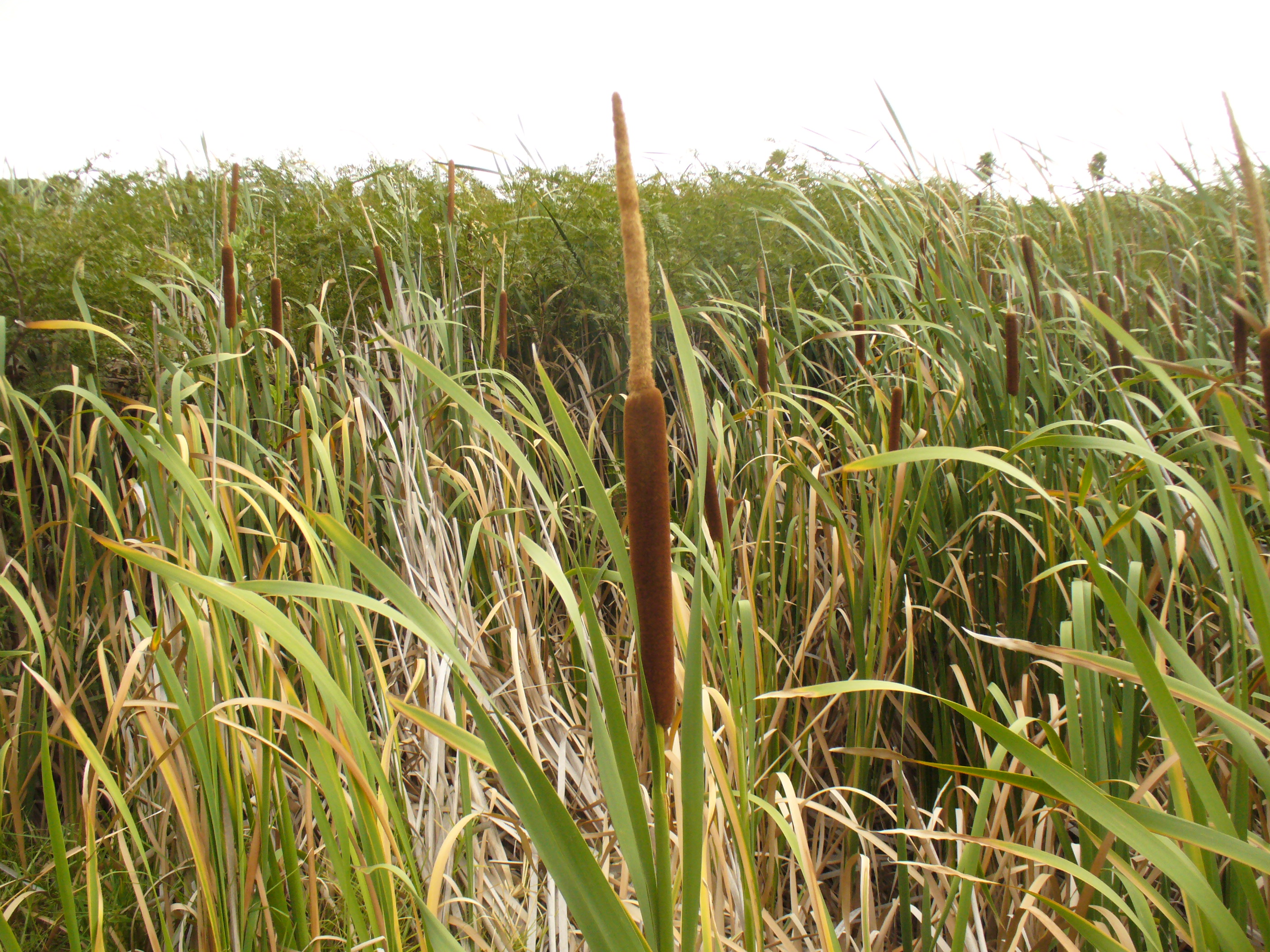
- Cape bulrush

Conservation status
- Least Concern (IUCN 3.1)

Scientific classification
- Kingdom: Plantae
- Clade: Tracheophytes
- Clade: Angiosperms
- Clade: Monocots
- Clade: Commelinids
- Order: Poales
- Family: Typhaceae
- Genus: Typha
- Species: T. capensis

Binomial name
- Typha capensis (Rohrb.) N.E. Br.

Synonyms
- Typha latifolia subsp. capensis Rohrb.

= Typha capensis =

Species of aquatic plant

Typha capensis is an aquatic plant known from southern and eastern Africa as far north as Uganda. It has also been reported from Brazil.

The rhizomes of Typha capensis are used medicinally in southern Africa. It is reported to improve circulation and to enhance male libido and performance.
