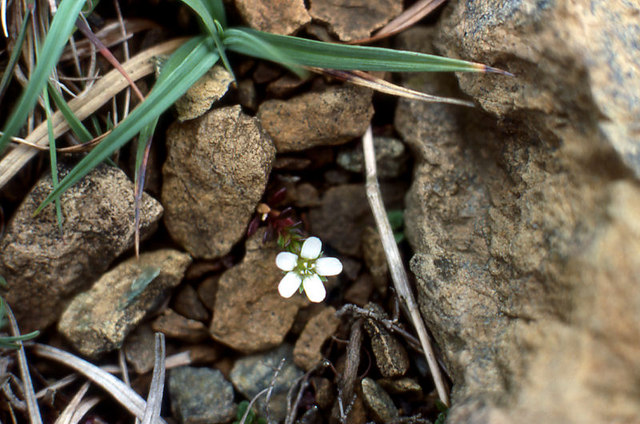

Scientific classification
- Kingdom: Plantae
- Clade: Embryophytes
- Clade: Tracheophytes
- Clade: Spermatophytes
- Clade: Angiosperms
- Clade: Eudicots
- Order: Caryophyllales
- Family: Caryophyllaceae
- Genus: Arenaria
- Species: A. norvegica

Binomial name
- Arenaria norvegica Gunnerus

= Arenaria norvegica =

Species of flowering plant

Arenaria norvegica, also known as Arctic, English or Norwegian sandwort, is a low growing plant in the family Caryophyllaceae, found in northwest Europe. The diploid chromosome number is 2n=80. There are two recognised subspecies.

== Description ==
Arenaria norvegica is a much branched, low-growing plant growing up to six centimetres tall. The midrib of the leaves is indistinct and the margins glabrous only in the lower third which distinguishes it from the rather similar Arenaria ciliata.

Arenaria norvegica subsp. anglica

Arenaria norvegica subsp. anglica is an annual or biennial with few non-flowering shoots. The leaves are opposite, narrowly ovate or elliptic. The flowers are eleven to twenty-three millimetres in diameter, have five white petals and three styles. The plant flowers from May to October.

Arenaria norvegica subsp. norvegica

Arenaria norvegica subsp. norvegica is a perennial with many non-flowering shoots. The leaves are obovate and the white flowers about ten millimeters across with five petals and three to five styles.

== Distribution ==
Both subspecies are uncommon and localised.
Arenaria norvegica subsp. anglica is restricted to limestone regions in the Yorkshire Dales in the United Kingdom.
Arenaria norvegica subsp. norvegica is found in west and northwest Scotland, the Shetland Isles, western Ireland, and Scandinavia and Iceland.
Arenaria norvegica is mentioned, in Edward Forbes essay (1846) "On the Connexion between the Distribution of the existing Fauna and Flora of the British Isles and the Geological Changes which have affected their area..." in Memoirs of Geological Survey of Great Britain H.M. Stationery Office, 1846 - England, as a plant among others that shows migration from Scandinavia by means of ice flows in the Glacial Epoch of the Pleistocene.

== Habitat ==
Arenaria norvegica subsp. anglica favours thin peaty soils in cracks, depressions or hollows on limestone rock. It is also found growing in moist calcareous flushes and in gritty soil at the edge of tracks. It typically grows among small sedges, fescue grass and other members of the pearlwort and sandwort genera. It is classified as a vulnerable endemic species in the vascular plant British Red Data Book.

Arenaria norvegica subsp. norvegica is found on base-rich (alkaline) sandy and gravelly substrates including those derived from ultrabasic igneous rocks and serpentine as well as limestone.
