= Mountain sandwort =

Mountain sandwort is a common name for several plants and may refer to:

- Arenaria montana, native to southwestern Europe
- Minuartia groenlandica syn. Arenaria groenlandica
- Minuartia rubella
