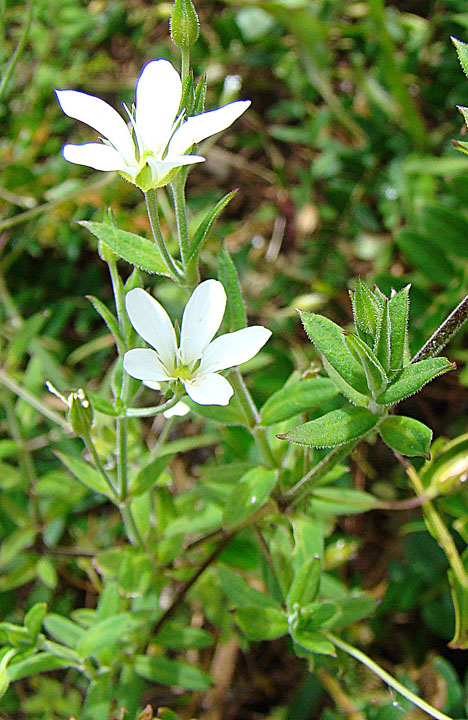

Conservation status
- Least Concern (IUCN 3.1)

Scientific classification
- Kingdom: Plantae
- Clade: Tracheophytes
- Clade: Angiosperms
- Clade: Eudicots
- Order: Caryophyllales
- Family: Caryophyllaceae
- Genus: Arenaria
- Species: A. lanuginosa

Binomial name
- Arenaria lanuginosa (Michx.) Rohrb.

Varieties
- Arenaria lanuginosa var. lanuginosa; Arenaria lanuginosa var. saxosa (A.Gray) Zarucci, R.L.Hartman & Rabeler

Synonyms
- Synonymy: Micropetalon lanuginosum (Michx.) Pers.; Spergulastrum lanuginosum Michx.; Stellaria lanuginosa (Michx.) Torr. & A.Gray synonyms of var. lanuginosa: Arenaria alsinoides Willd. ex D.F.K.Schltdl.; Arenaria alsinoides var. ovatifolia Donn.Sm.; Arenaria diffusa Elliott; Arenaria diffusa var. tucumanensis Griseb.; Arenaria guatemalensis Standl. & Steyerm.; Arenaria guatemalensis var. ensifolia (Rohrb.) Standl. & Steyerm.; Arenaria jussiaei Cambess. ex St.Hil.; Arenaria lanuginosa var. diffusa Rohrb.; Arenaria lanuginosa var. diffusa (Elliott) Macloskie, nom. illeg. homonym. post.; Arenaria lanuginosa var. ensifolia Rohrb.; Arenaria lanuginosa subsp. guatemalensis (Standl. & Steyerm.) J.A.Duke; Arenaria lanuginosa var. longipedunculata W.H.Duncan; Arenaria lanuginosa var. megalantha Rohrb.; Arenaria lanuginosa var. tucumanensis (Griseb.) Pax; Arenaria megalantha (Rohrb.) F.N.Williams; Arenaria megalantha var. ensifolia (Rohrb.) F.N.Williams; Arenaria megalantha var. tucumanensis (Griseb.) F.N.Williams; Arenaria nemorosa Kunth; Arenaria nemorosa var. novogranatensis Ser.; Arenaria nemorosa var. quitensis Ser.; Arenaria paradoxa Bartl.; Arenaria peruviana Poepp. ex Rohrb., not validly publ.; Bigelowia elongata Raf.; Lepigonum paradoxum Kindb.; Moehringia nemorosa Fenzl ex Hemsl., not validly publ.; Stellaria elongata Nutt.; Stellaria lagunensis M.E.Jones; Stellaria laxa Muschl., nom. illeg. homonym. post.; Stellaria pubescens Willd. ex Kunth; Tissa paradoxa (Bartl.) Reiche synonyms of var. saxosa: Arenaria confusa Rydb.; Arenaria lanuginosa var. cinerascens (B.L.Rob.) Shinners; Arenaria lanuginosa subsp. saxosa (A.Gray) Maguire; Arenaria mearnsii Wooton & Standl.; Arenaria polycaulos Rydb.; Arenaria saxosa A.Gray; Arenaria saxosa var. cinerascens B.L.Rob.; Arenaria saxosa var. mearnsii (Wooton & Standl.) Kearney & Peebles; Spergulastrum lanuginosum subsp. saxosum (A.Gray) W.A.Weber

= Arenaria lanuginosa =

Species of plant

Arenaria lanuginosa is a species of flowering plant in the family Caryophyllaceae. Its common name is spreading sandwort. It is an annual or subshrub native to the subtropical and tropical Americas.

== Description ==
Arenaria lanuginosa has thin stems that spread low to the ground. Grown on the stems are thin linear leaves and small white five-petaled flowers that show green sepals between each petal. Stamens and carpel are pale green and white.

== Range ==
It is native to the southwestern, south-central, and southeastern United States, Mexico, the Caribbean, Central America, Andean South America, northern Argentina, and southern and southeastern Brazil.

== Habitat ==
It can be found in open woodlands, rocky areas, and damp thickets.

== Varieties ==
Two varieties are accepted.

- Arenaria lanuginosa var. lanuginosa
- Arenaria lanuginosa var. saxosa (A.Gray) Zarucci, R.L.Hartman & Rabeler – Rock sandwort. Southwestern United States to Texas, central and southern Mexico to Guatemala, and Panama.

== Taxonomy ==
The species was first described as Spergulastrum lanuginosum by André Michaux in 1803. In 1872 Paul Rohrbach placed the species in genus Arenaria as A. lanuginosa.
