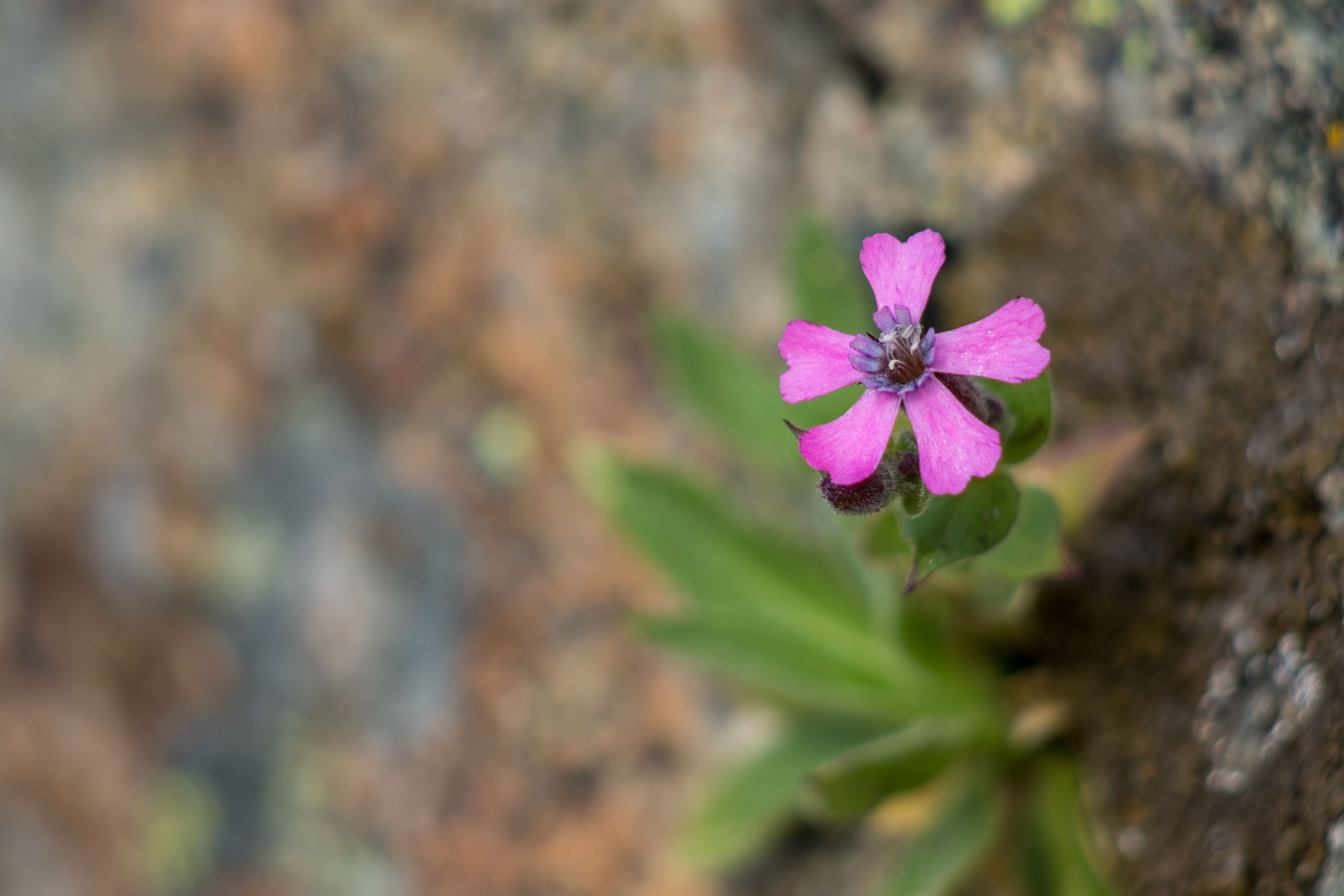

Scientific classification
- Kingdom: Plantae
- Clade: Tracheophytes
- Clade: Angiosperms
- Clade: Eudicots
- Order: Caryophyllales
- Family: Caryophyllaceae
- Genus: Silene
- Species: S. acutifolia

Binomial name
- Silene acutifolia Link ex Rohrb.

Synonyms
- Silene melandrioides Lange

= Silene acutifolia =

Species of plant native to Spain and Portugal

Silene acutifolia is a species of herb native to northwest Spain as well as central and northern Portugal. The species is polycarpic and usually grows in rocky environments.

== Description ==
The flowers are purplish-pink and hypogynous. They are also hermaphroditic and protandrous, however, the temporal separation between the male or female stages is incomplete making self-pollination possible. One study from 2002 suggested this might indicate that the species emerged recently in the genus.
