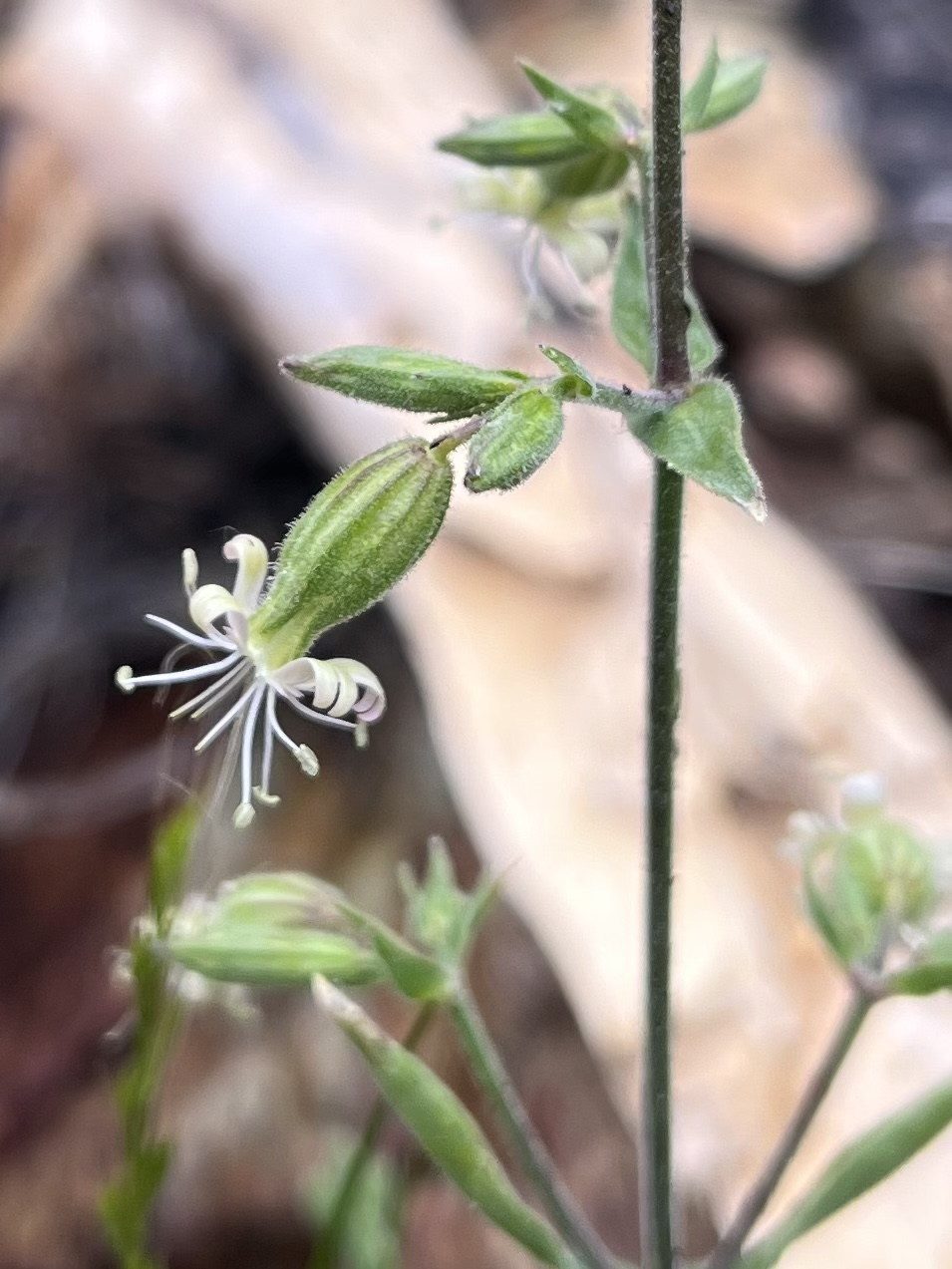

Scientific classification
- Kingdom: Plantae
- Clade: Tracheophytes
- Clade: Angiosperms
- Clade: Eudicots
- Order: Caryophyllales
- Family: Caryophyllaceae
- Genus: Silene
- Species: S. bridgesii

Binomial name
- Silene bridgesii Rohrb.

= Silene bridgesii =

Species of flowering plant

Silene bridgesii is a species of flowering plant in the family Caryophyllaceae known by the common name Bridges' catchfly.

== Description ==
It is a perennial herb growing from a taproot and woody caudex unit, its stem decumbent or growing erect to half a meter or more in height. It is hairy, the upper hairs glandular, making the plant sticky in texture. The lower leaves are widely lance-shaped, up to 8 centimeters long by 1.5 wide. Upper leaves are smaller. Flowers occur in a terminal cyme at the top of the stem, as well as in some of the leaf axils, where they nod or hang like a bell. Each has a hairy, glandular calyx of fused sepals with ten veins. The calyx is open at the tip, revealing five white, pinkish, or greenish petals each with two rectangular lobes at the tip. The very long stamens and three styles protrude from the flower's center.

== Distribution and habitat ==
It is native to California, where it can be found throughout the Sierra Nevada and the southern reaches of the Cascade Range to the north, its distribution possibly extending into Oregon. It grows in mountain forests and woodlands.
