= Monte Gonare =

Mountain in Sardinia, Italy

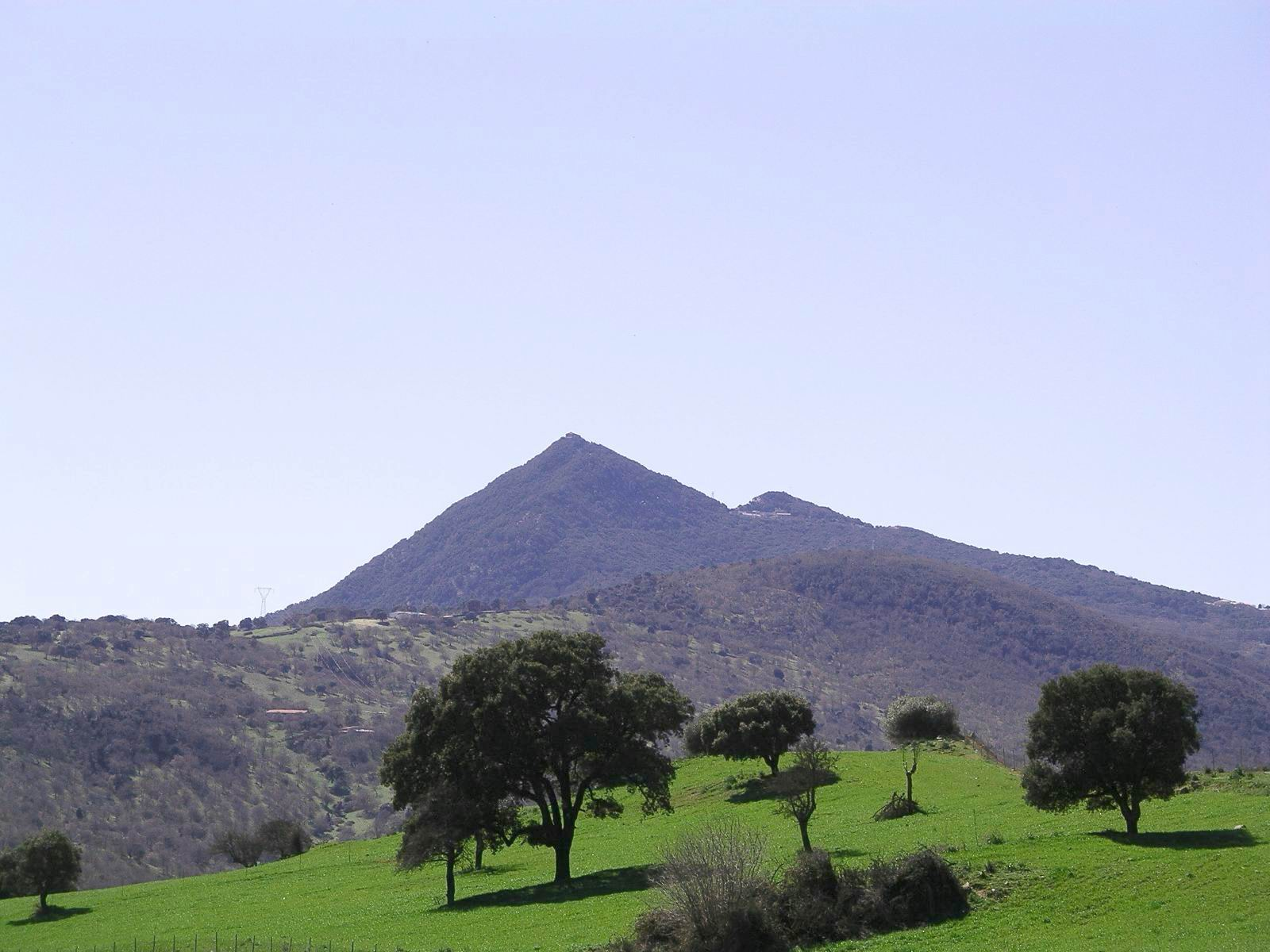
- Mount Gonare.

Highest point
- Elevation: 1,083 m (3,553 ft)
- Coordinates: 40°13′38″N 9°12′10″E

Geography
- Location within Italy
- Location: Sardinia, Province of Nuoro, Italy

Mount Gonare is a mountain formation in central Sardinia, in the province of Nuoro. It is located in the administrative territory of Orani and Sarule and rises to an elevation of 1,083 m above sea level.

The territory of the mountain complex has been proposed and included among the sites of community interest of the region of Sardinia.

== Description ==
=== Origin and meaning of the name ===
The mount is named after Gonario II, judge of Torres. It is known from history that he, still at a very young age, succeeded his father Constantine I in the inheritance of the Judicate. He lived and married in Pisa; at the age of 20, in 1127, he returned to Sardinia to take over the government of his Judicate. In 1147 after 20 years of reign, responding to the call to the Christian world for the second crusade, he was seen wandering to the Holy Land.

It was on his return from this journey that Judge Gonario's sailing ship ran into a violent storm that threatened to submerge everyone. Then Gonario made a promise to build a temple to Our Lady on the strip of land that first appeared to them on the Island, if the Virgin would save them from shipwreck. The Virgin answered the prayer and the storm ceased. Approaching the Sardinian coast, while the coastline was still hidden by mist, a distant peak shone, illuminated by the sun: it was the summit of the mountain that would later be called Gonare.

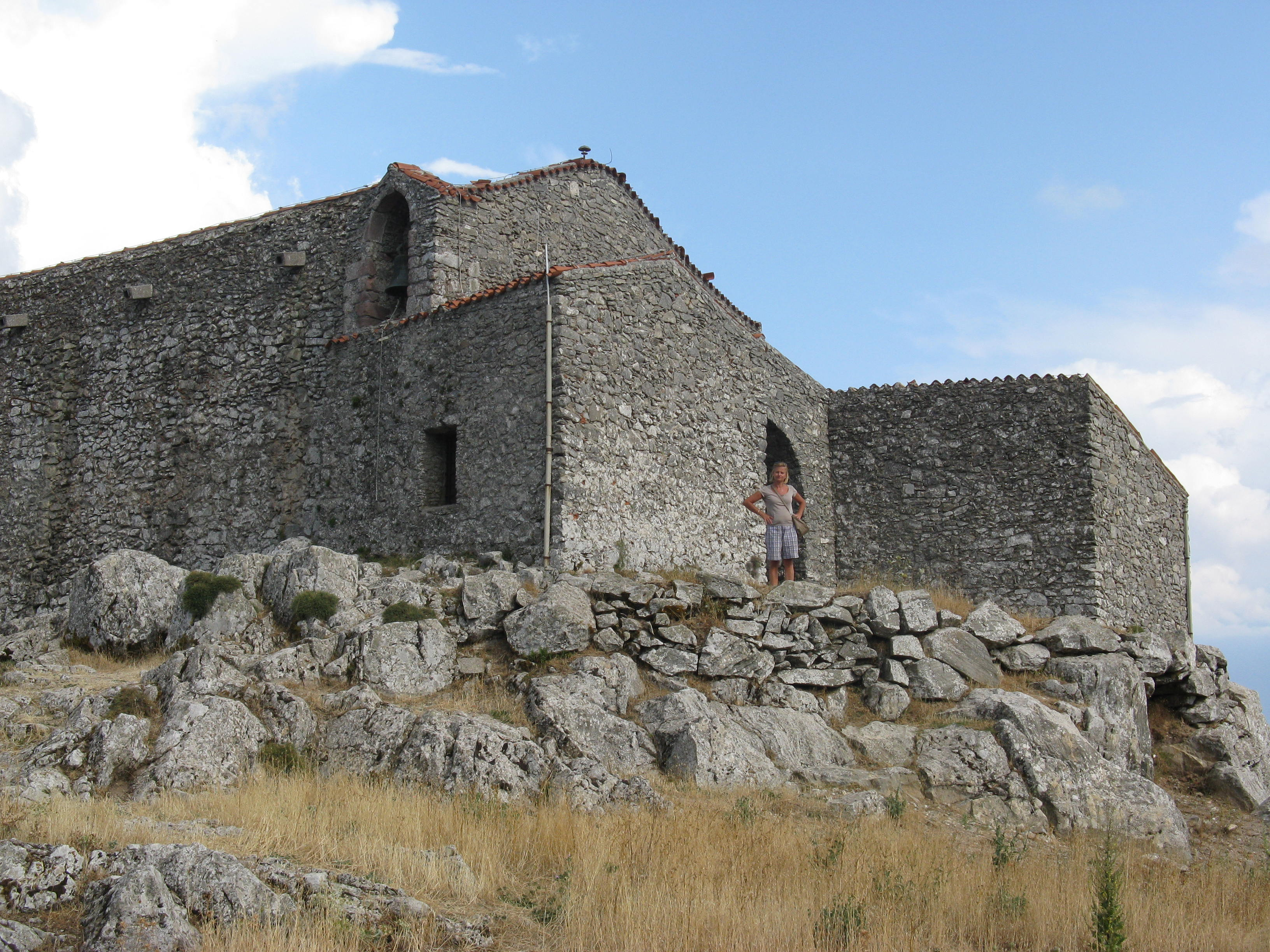
Church of Our Lady of Gonare

The promise was kept, and on the summit arose the Church of the Vow. Now for 8 centuries it has overlooked a large number of villages, and every year hosts crowds of pilgrims who come to the mountain to fulfill a vow, to give thanks, and to beg the Virgin and Child.

=== Territory ===
The mountain complex consists of three peaks; Gonare (1,083 meters), Gonareddu (1,045 meters) and Punta Lotzori (976 meters). Geomorphologically, it consists of limestone rocks. However, the area surrounding the mountain appears to be very diverse, with outcrops of compact, coarse-grained granites that are light gray in color. Events related to the Hercynian orogeny resulted in uplift and deformation leading to the intrusion of granites and uplift of the metamorphic cover. Contact metamorphism produced deposits of hornfel, marble, and talc, which were exploited as stone materials in the past.

On the highest peak (Gonare) is a small church, dedicated to Our Lady of Gonare, dating from around the 17th century. On September 8 each year a festival is held there, which is organized alternately by the communities of Sarule and Orani.

=== Climate ===
The climate of the Mount Gonare area is a Mediterranean climate characterized by a rainfall regime concentrated in the autumn and winter months, with amounts varying, depending on altitude, between 700 and 1,000 millimeters per year. Snowfall may occur infrequently. Average temperatures are between 11 and 15 degrees Celsius. The dominant winds are from the western quadrants.

=== Flora and fauna ===
The flora is composed of species such as downy oak (Quercus pubescens), holm oak (Quercus ilex), chestnut (Castanea sativa), pauciflorous garlic (Allium parciflorum), smearwort (Aristolochia rotunda), the spatulate daisy (Bellium bellidioides), the thorny ruddy grass (Dipsacus ferox), Ephedra nebrodensis, Euphorbia semiperfoliata, Corsican bedstraw (Galium corsicum), the Sardinian groundsel (Glechoma sardoa), helichrysum (Helichrysum italicum), holly (Ilex aquifolium), Montpellier maple (Acer monspessulanum), common twayblade (Listera ovata), Corsican Mercurialis (Mercurialis corsica), the early-purple orchid of Sardinia (Orchis mascula ichnusae), the Sardinian-corso ornithogalum (Ornithogalum corsicum), the royal fern (Osmunda regalis), the wild peony (Paeonia mascula), the sea lily (Pancratium illyricum) and Psoralea morisiana.

Plant species endemic to the flora of Sardinia include Stachys glutinosa, Crocus minimus, mossy sandwort (Arenaria balearica), Sardinian mint (Mentha insularis), Arum pictum, Borago pygmaea, the Sardinian berry (Acinos sardous), Gonare's colchicum (Colchicum gonarei), Polypodium interjectum, lesser meadow-rue (Thalictrum minus), common twayblade (Listera ovata), bird's-nest orchid (Neottia nidus-avis) and wild asparagus (Asparagus tenuifolius).

Common among fauna species are the Sardinian partridge (Alectoris barbara), Mehely's horseshoe bat (Rhinolophus mehelyi), lesser horseshoe bat (Rhinolophus hipposideros), greater horseshoe bat (Rhinolophus ferrumequinum) and common bent-wing bat (Miniopterus schreibersi). Amphibians include the Sardinian tree frog (Hyla sarda).

== See also ==
- Sardinia
- Province of Nuoro
- Orani, Sardinia
- Sarule

== Bibliography ==
- Ignazio Camarda, ed. (1993). Montagne di Sardegna. Sassari: Carlo Delfino.
- Ignazio Camarda (1984). "Studi sulla flora e sulla vegetazione del Monte Gonare (Sardegna centrale): 1. la flora" (PDF). Bollettino della Società sarda di scienze naturali. 23 (1984): 173–211. ISSN 0392-6710.
