= Orani, Sardinia =

Orani Orane (Sardinian)
- Comune
- Comune di Orani
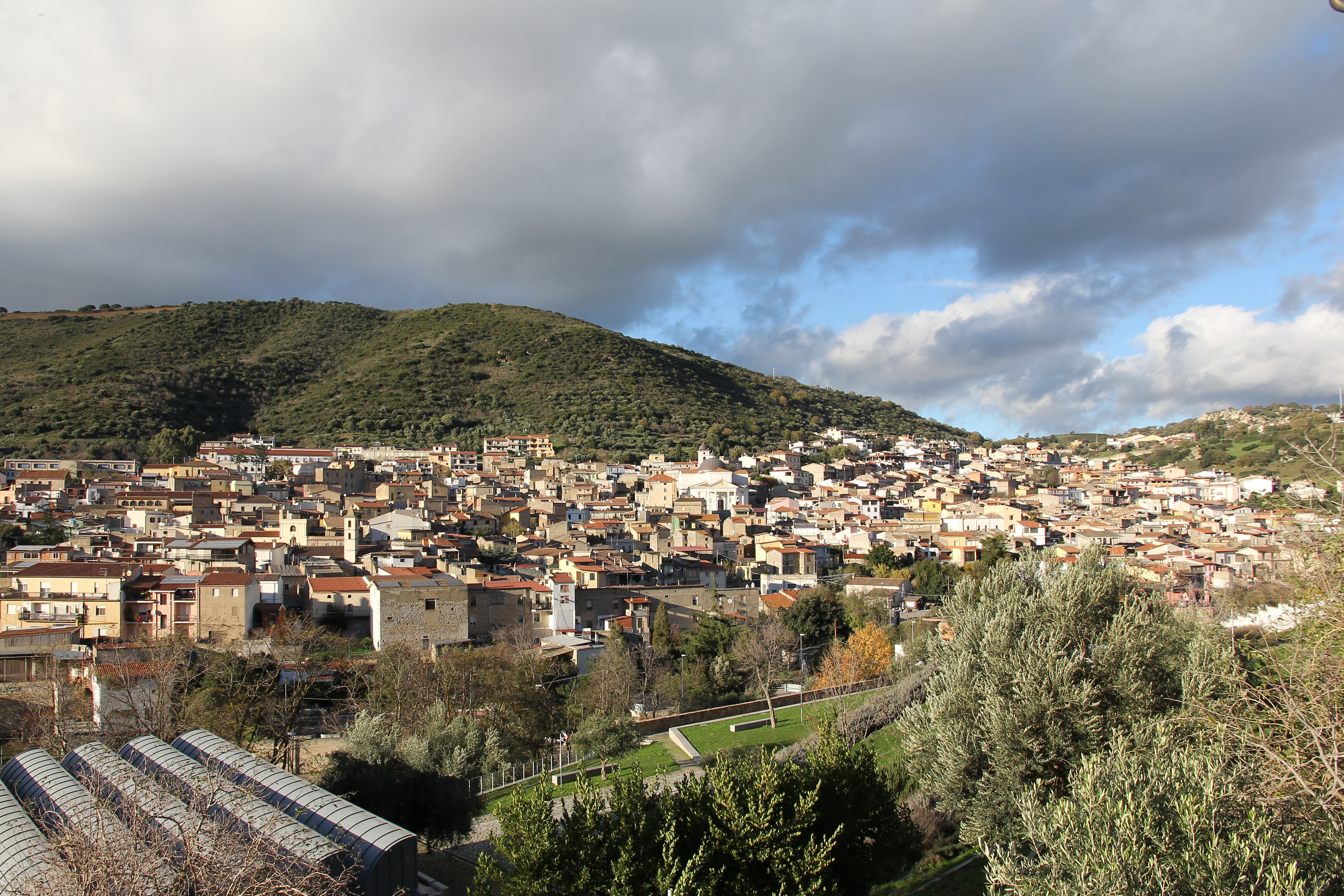
- View of Orani

- Location within Sardinia
- Coordinates: 40°15′00″N 9°10′45″E
- Country: Italy
- Region: Sardinia
- Province: Province of Nuoro (NU)

Area
  - Total: 130.43 km^{2} (50.36 sq mi)
- Elevation: 540 m (1,770 ft)

Population (2026)
  - Total: 2,576
  - Density: 19.75/km^{2} (51.15/sq mi)
- Demonym: Oranesi
- Time zone: UTC+1 (CET)
  - Summer (DST): UTC+2 (CEST)
- Postal code: 08026
- Dialing code: 0784

Orani (Sardinian: Orane) is a town and comune (municipality) in the Province of Nuoro in the autonomous island region of Sardinia in Italy, located about 110 kilometres (68 mi) north of Cagliari and about 15 kilometres (9 mi) southwest of Nuoro. It has 2,576 inhabitants.

Orani sits at an altitude of 526 metres (1,726 ft), at the foot of Mount Gonare, in the heart of the Barbagia region. Orani excels in handicrafts, and is famous for its stonework, carpentry, and metalwork, and for tailors specializing in the use of traditional Sardinian velvety.

Orani borders the municipalities of Benetutti, Bolotana, Illorai, Mamoiada, Nuoro, Oniferi, Orotelli, Ottana, and Sarule.

== Demographics ==
As of 2026, the population is 2,576, of which 49.7% are male, and 50.3% are female. Minors make up 12.3% of the population, and seniors make up 32.5%.

Historical population

Year	Pop.	±%
1861	2,381	—
1871	2,528	+6.2%
1881	2,616	+3.5%
1901	2,828	+8.1%
1911	2,858	+1.1%
1921	2,993	+4.7%
1931	2,970	−0.8%
1936	3,083	+3.8%

Year	Pop.	±%
1951	3,512	+13.9%
1961	3,667	+4.4%
1971	3,205	−12.6%
1981	3,263	+1.8%
1991	3,212	−1.6%
2001	3,152	−1.9%
2011	3,007	−4.6%
2021	2,723	−9.4%

Source: ISTAT

=== Immigration ===
As of 2025, immigrants make up 3.5% of the population. The 5 largest foreign countries of birth are France, Germany, Romania, Morocco, and Colombia.

== Sights ==
Among the notable archaeological sites in the area are approximately 30 nuraghi and several giants' graves. The Sanctuary of Our Lady of Gonare at the crest of the mountain is of particular interest, as is the natural landscape on the road leading up to it. The city is also home to the Nivola Museum.

== Gallery ==
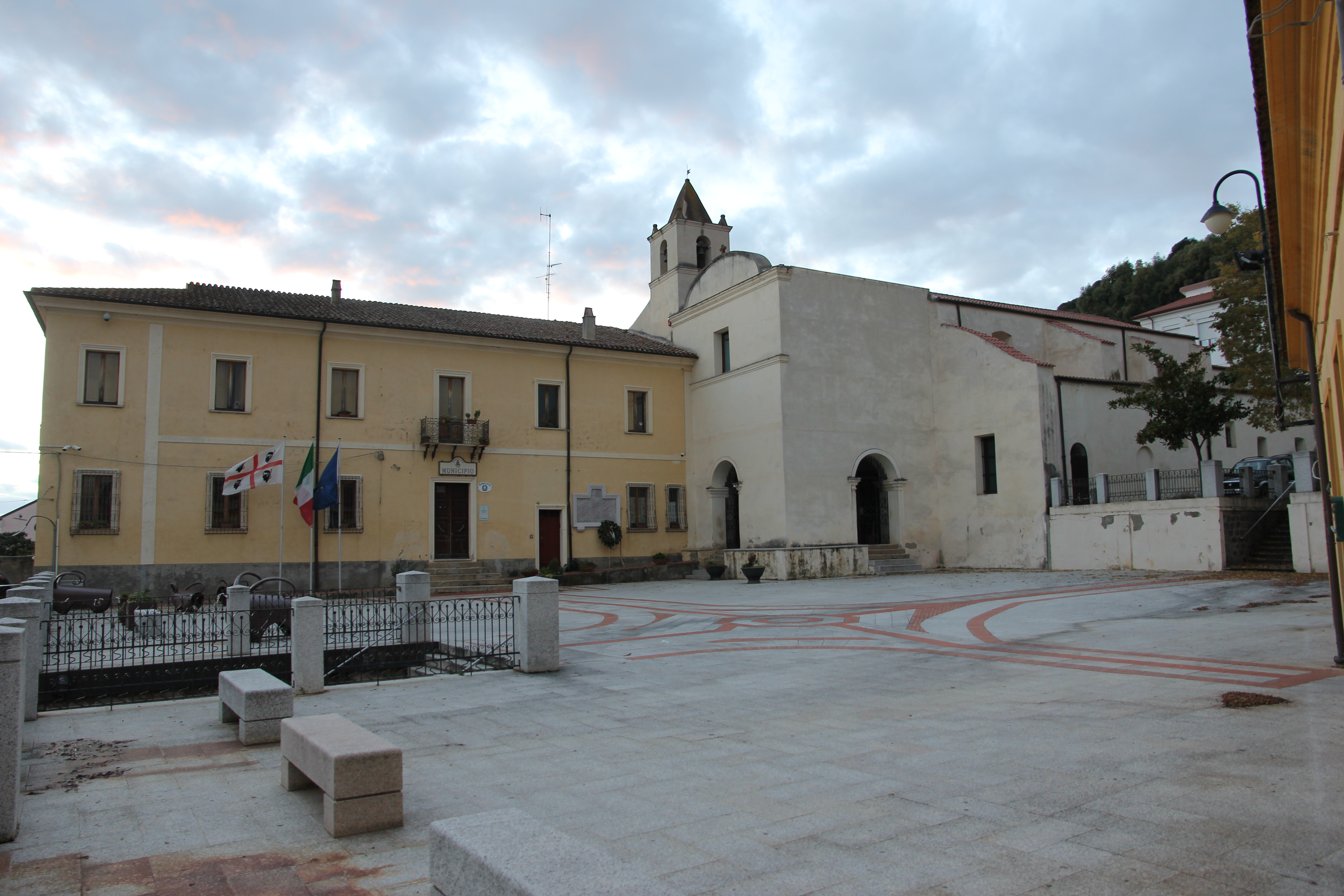
Piazza Cumbentu

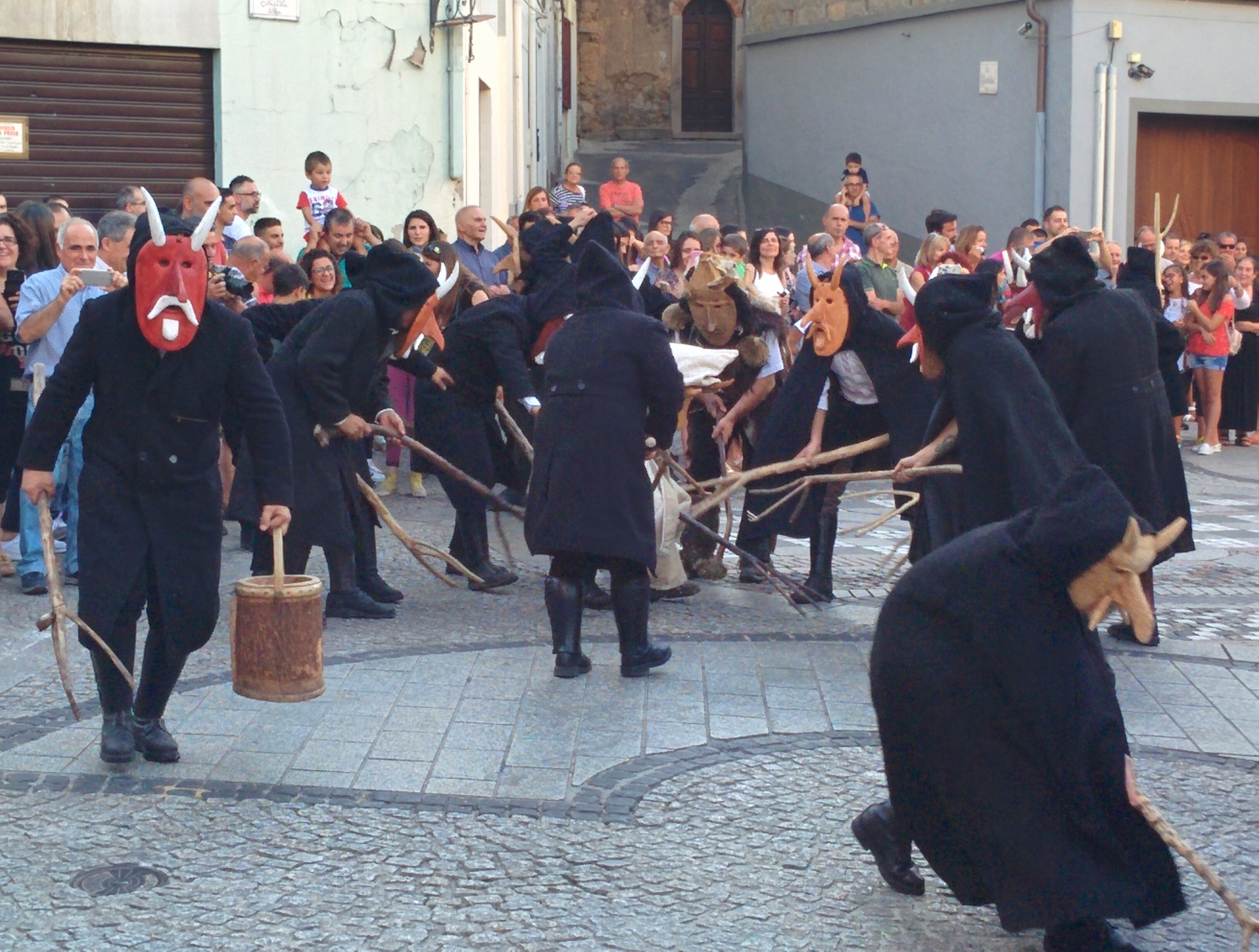
Ancient rite in Orani

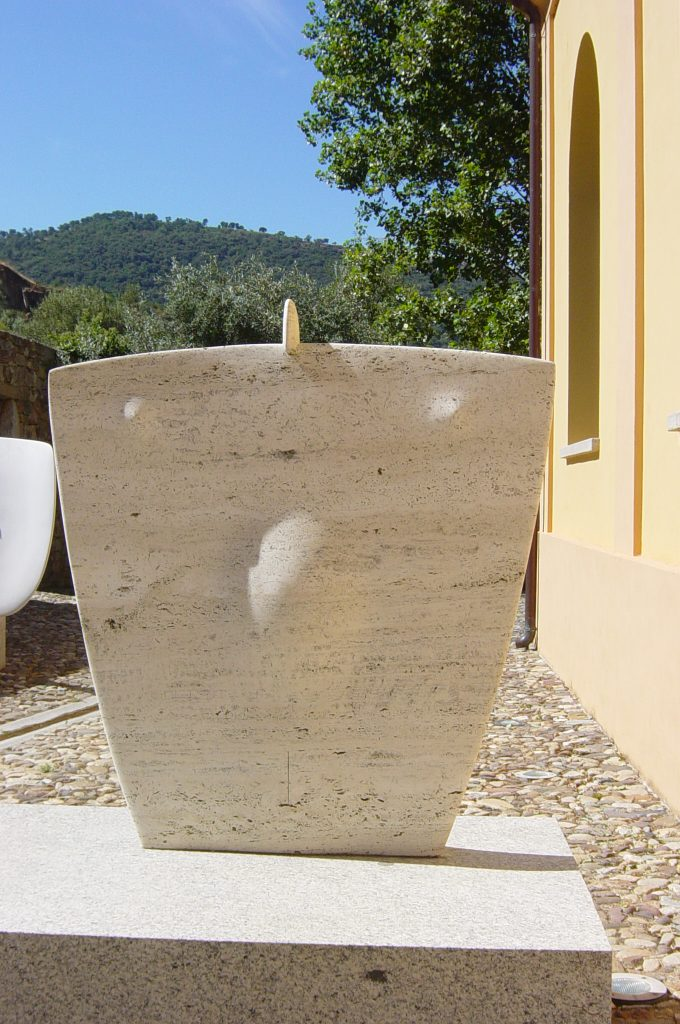
Figure at Nivola Museum

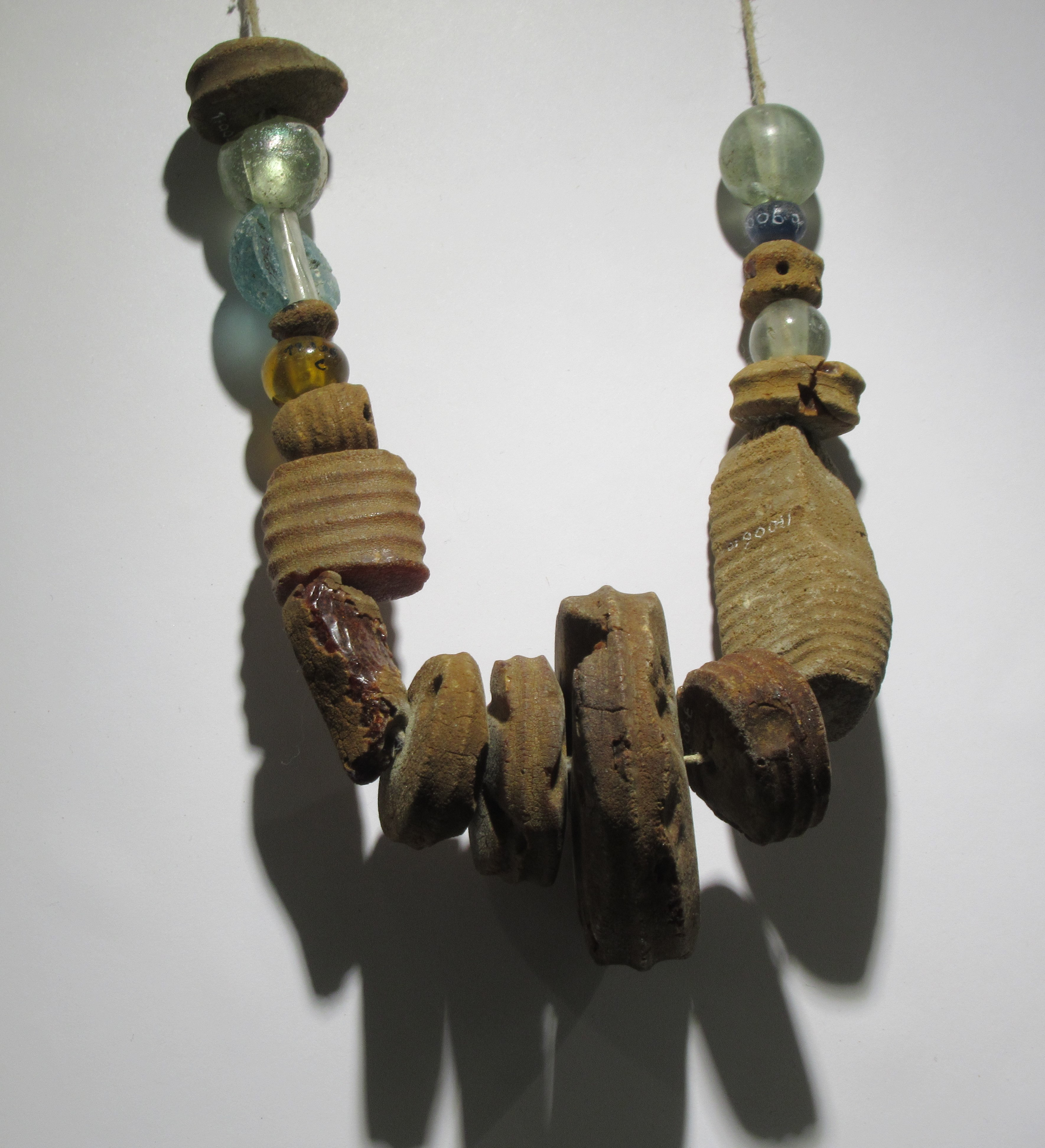
Necklace with amber, rock crystal, and glass beads from Nuraghe Nurdole

== Notable people ==
- Costantino Nivola (1911-1988), artist
- Salvatore Niffoi (1950), writer
