= Arenaria radians =

Conservation status
- Critically Endangered (IUCN 3.1)

Scientific classification
- Kingdom: Plantae
- Clade: Tracheophytes
- Clade: Angiosperms
- Clade: Eudicots
- Order: Caryophyllales
- Family: Caryophyllaceae
- Genus: Arenaria
- Species: A. radians

Binomial name
- Arenaria radians Benth.

Species of flowering plant

Arenaria radians is a species of plant in the family Caryophyllaceae. It is endemic to Ecuador. Its natural habitat is subtropical or tropical high-elevation grassland. It is threatened by habitat loss.
