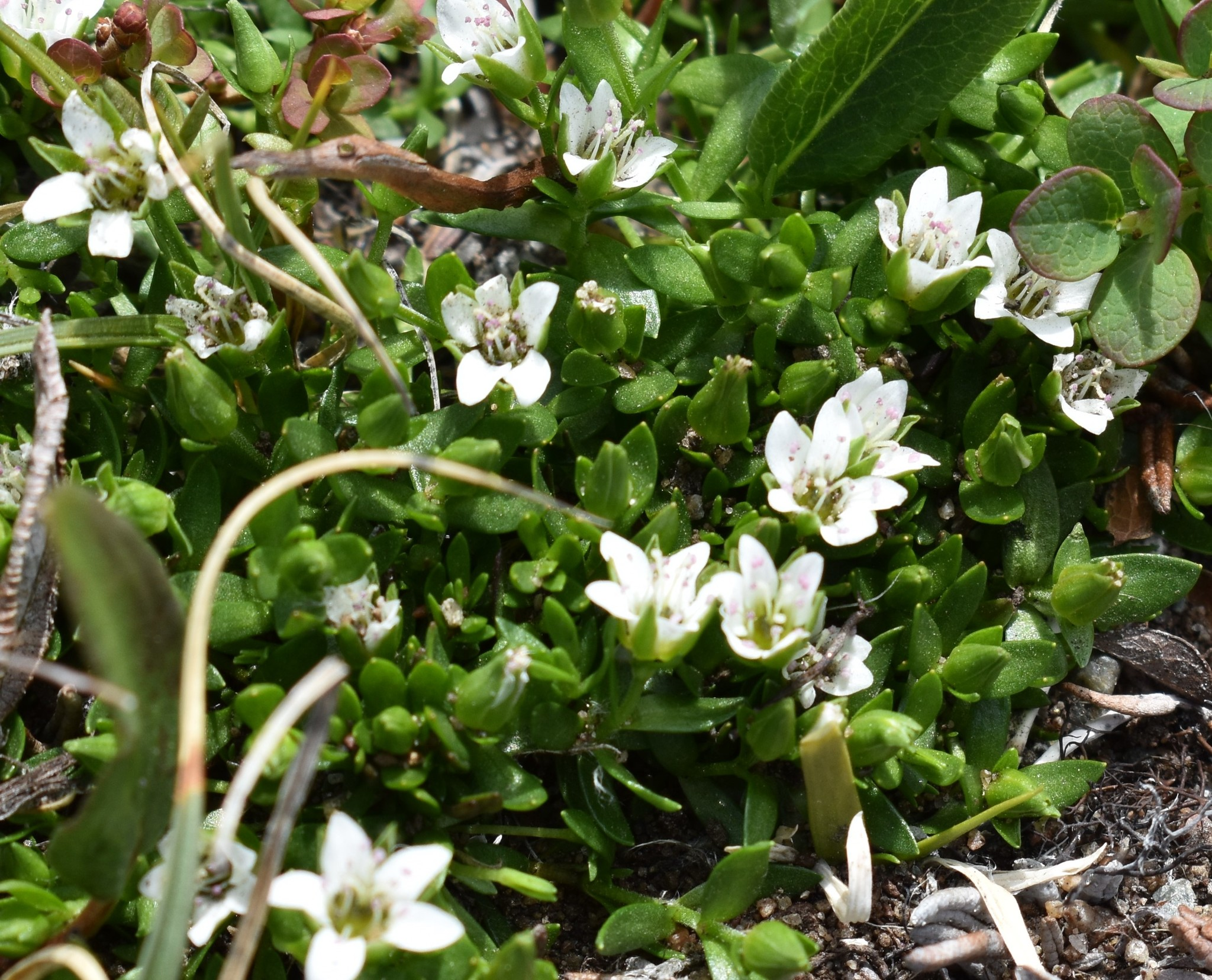

Scientific classification
- Kingdom: Plantae
- Clade: Tracheophytes
- Clade: Angiosperms
- Clade: Eudicots
- Order: Caryophyllales
- Family: Caryophyllaceae
- Genus: Arenaria
- Species: A. humifusa

Binomial name
- Arenaria humifusa Wahlenb.

= Arenaria humifusa =

Species of flowering plant

Arenaria humifusa is a species of flowering plant belonging to the family Caryophyllaceae.

Its native range is Subarctic to Northeastern Canada.
