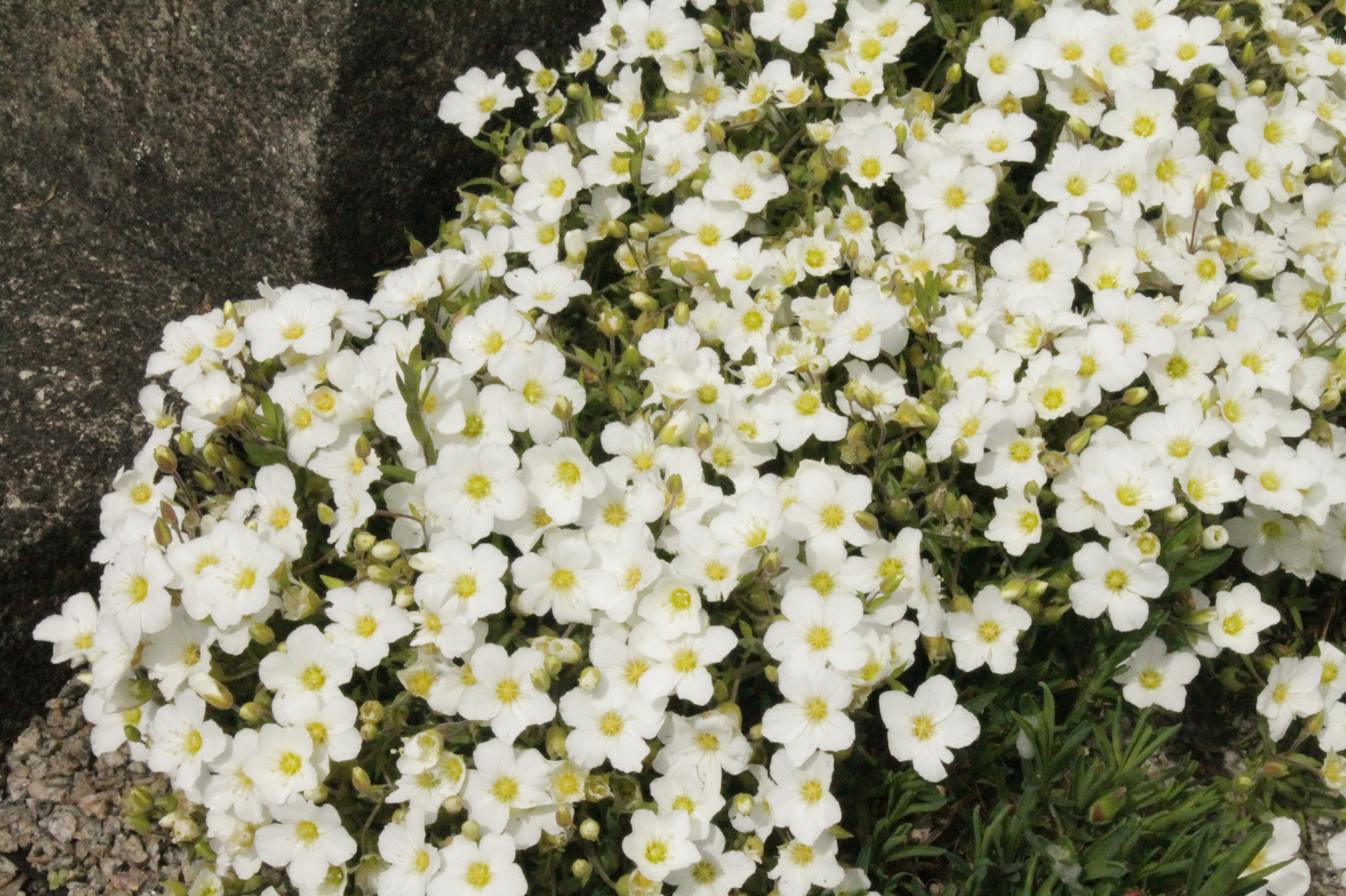
- Arenaria montana

Scientific classification
- Kingdom: Plantae
- Clade: Tracheophytes
- Clade: Angiosperms
- Clade: Eudicots
- Order: Caryophyllales
- Family: Caryophyllaceae
- Genus: Arenaria; L.

Species
- ~150, see text

Synonyms
- Greniera J. Gay, 1845

= Arenaria (plant) =

Genus of flowering plants in the pink family

Arenaria is a genus of flowering plants, within the family Caryophyllaceae. Most species are annual or perennial herbaceous plants, though a small number are spiny subshrubs; many grow in tufts or mats.

Species of this genus are among those plants commonly known as sandworts. Several species formerly classified within Arenaria are now classed in the genera Spergularia, Eremogone and Minuartia.

== Species ==
Species accepted by the Plants of the World Online as of September 2021:

- Arenaria acaulis Montesinos & Kool
- Arenaria achalensis Griseb.
- Arenaria aggregata (L.) Loisel.
- Arenaria alfacarensis Pamp.
- Arenaria algarbiensis Welw. ex Willk.
- Arenaria alpamarcae A.Gray
- Arenaria altorum Standl. & Steyerm.
- Arenaria andina Rohrb.
- Arenaria angustifolia McNeill
- Arenaria angustifolioides Kit Tan & Sorger
- Arenaria antitaurica McNeill
- Arenaria aphanantha Wedd.
- Arenaria arcuatociliata G.López & Nieto Fel.
- Arenaria armerina Bory
- Arenaria aucheriana Boiss.
- Arenaria balansae Boiss.
- Arenaria balearica L.
- Arenaria benthamii Fenzl ex Torr. & A.Gray
- Arenaria bertolonii Fiori & Paol.
- Arenaria biflora L.
- Arenaria bisulca (Bartl.) Fenzl ex Rohrb.
- Arenaria boliviana F.N.Williams
- Arenaria bourgaei Hemsl.
- Arenaria bryoides Willd. ex D.F.K.Schltdl.
- Arenaria bulica Stapf ex F.N.Williams
- Arenaria capillipes (Boiss.) Boiss.
- Arenaria cariensis Carlström
- Arenaria carinata (Muschl.) Molinari
- Arenaria catamarcensis Pax
- Arenaria cerastioides Poir.
- Arenaria chiapensis Standl. & Steyerm.
- Arenaria cikaea F.K.Mey.
- Arenaria ciliata L.
- Arenaria cinerea DC.
- Arenaria conferta Boiss.
- Arenaria conica Boiss.
- Arenaria conimbricensis Brot.
- Arenaria controversa Boiss.
- Arenaria crassipes Baehni & J.F.Macbr.
- Arenaria cretica Spreng.
- Arenaria deflexa Decne.
- Arenaria delaguardiae G.López & Nieto Fel.
- Arenaria densissima Wall. ex Edgew. & Hook.f.
- Arenaria dicranoides Kunth
- Arenaria digyna Willd. ex D.F.K.Schltdl.
- Arenaria dyris Humbert
- Arenaria eliasiana Kit Tan & Sorger
- Arenaria emarginata Brot.
- Arenaria engleriana Muschl.
- Arenaria erinacea Boiss.
- Arenaria filicaulis Fenzl ex Griseb.
- Arenaria fontqueri Cardona & J.M.Monts.
- Arenaria fragillima Rech.f.
- Arenaria funiculata Fior & P.O.Karis
- Arenaria geladaindongensis R.F.Huang & S.K.Wu
- Arenaria gionae Gustavsson
- Arenaria globiflora (Fenzl) Wall. ex Edgew. & Hook.f.
- Arenaria glochidisperma (J.M.Monts.) Fior & P.O.Karis
- Arenaria goekyigitii Dinç & Dogu
- Arenaria gothica Fr.
- Arenaria gracilis Waldst. & Kit.
- Arenaria grandiflora L.
- Arenaria graveolens Schreb.
- Arenaria guicciardii Heldr. ex Boiss.
- Arenaria gypsostrata B.L.Turner
- Arenaria halacsyi Bald.
- Arenaria hintoniorum B.L.Turner
- Arenaria hispanica Spreng.
- Arenaria hispida L.
- Arenaria horizontalis (Muschl.) Molinari
- Arenaria humifusa Wahlenb.
- Arenaria huteri A.Kern.
- Arenaria jamesoniana Rohrb.
- Arenaria kandavanensis Fadaie, Sheidai & Assadi
- Arenaria katoana Makino
- Arenaria kotschyana Fenzl
- Arenaria kurdica McNeill
- Arenaria ladyginii Kozhevn.
- Arenaria lanuginosa (Michx.) Rohrb.
- Arenaria latisepala R.F.Huang & S.K.Wu
- Arenaria leptoclados (Rchb.) Guss.
- Arenaria leucadia Phitos & Strid
- Arenaria libanotica Kotschy
- Arenaria ligericina Lecoq & Lamotte
- Arenaria livermorensis Correll
- Arenaria longipedunculata Hultén
- Arenaria ludens Shinners
- Arenaria luschanii McNeill
- Arenaria lycopodioides Willd. ex D.F.K.Schltdl.
- Arenaria macrocalyx Tausch
- Arenaria macrosepala Boiss.
- Arenaria mairei Emb.
- Arenaria mandoniana Wedd.
- Arenaria marschlinsii W.D.J.Koch
- Arenaria mattfeldii Baehni
- Arenaria mcneillii Aytaç & H.Duman
- Arenaria merckioides Maxim.
- Arenaria mexicana (Bartl.) Steud.
- Arenaria microcalyx Koç & Hamzaoglu
- Arenaria minutissima Rech.f. & Esfand.
- Arenaria modesta Dufour
- Arenaria moehringioides Murr
- Arenaria mons-cragus Kit Tan & Sorger
- Arenaria montana L.
- Arenaria moritziana Pax
- Arenaria muralis (Link) Sieber & Spreng.
- Arenaria musciformis Triana & Planch.
- Arenaria neelgherrensis Wight & Arn.
- Arenaria nevadensis Boiss. & Reut.
- Arenaria nitida (Bartl.) Rohrb.
- Arenaria norvegica Gunnerus
- Arenaria obtusiflora Kunze
- Arenaria oligosperma Naudin
- Arenaria olloixii Jahand., Maire & Weiller
- Arenaria orbicularis Vis.
- Arenaria orbiculata Royle ex Edgew. & Hook.f.
- Arenaria orbignyana Wedd.
- Arenaria oreophila Hook.f.
- Arenaria oresbia Greenm.
- Arenaria pallens Muschl.
- Arenaria paludicola B.L.Rob.
- Arenaria pamphylica Boiss. & Heldr.
- Arenaria parvifolia Benth.
- Arenaria pedunculosa Wedd.
- Arenaria peloponnesiaca Rech.f.
- Arenaria peruviana (Muschl.) Molinari
- Arenaria peyritschii Rohrb.
- Arenaria phitosiana Greuter & Burdet
- Arenaria × piifontii M.B.Crespo & Mateo
- Arenaria pintaudii Molinari
- Arenaria pleurantha Phil.
- Arenaria poeppigiana Rohrb.
- Arenaria polytrichoides Edgew.
- Arenaria pomelii Munby
- Arenaria provincialis Chater & P.Halliday
- Arenaria pseudofrigida (Ostenf. & O.C.Dahl) Steffen
- Arenaria pungens Clemente ex Lag.
- Arenaria puranensis L.H.Zhou
- Arenaria purpurascens Ramond ex DC.
- Arenaria pycnophylla Rohrb.
- Arenaria pycnophylloides Pax
- Arenaria querioides Pourr. ex Willk.
- Arenaria radians Benth.
- Arenaria redowskii Cham. & Schltdl.
- Arenaria reinholdiana Molinari
- Arenaria reptans Hemsl.
- Arenaria retusa Boiss.
- Arenaria rhodia Boiss.
- Arenaria rivularis Phil.
- Arenaria rotundifolia M.Bieb.
- Arenaria runemarkii Phitos
- Arenaria sabulinea Griseb. ex Fenzl.
- Arenaria saponarioides Boiss. & Balansa
- Arenaria saxigena (Humbert & Maire) Dobignard
- Arenaria semiromica Fadaie
- Arenaria serpens Kunth
- Arenaria serpyllifolia L.
- Arenaria sipylea Boiss.
- Arenaria sivasica Kit Tan & Sorger
- Arenaria smithiana Mattf.
- Arenaria soratensis Rohrb.
- Arenaria speluncarum McNeill
- Arenaria standleyi Baehni & J.F.Macbr.
- Arenaria stuebelii Hieron.
- Arenaria suffruticosa Fior & P.O.Karis
- Arenaria taiwanensis S.S.Ying
- Arenaria tejedensis (Willk.) Fior & P.O.Karis
- Arenaria tenella Kit. ex Schult.
- Arenaria tenera Edgew.
- Arenaria tequilana B.L.Turner
- Arenaria tetragyna Willd. ex D.F.K.Schltdl.
- Arenaria tetraquetra L.
- Arenaria tmolea Boiss.
- Arenaria tomentosa Willk.
- Arenaria uninervia McNeill
- Arenaria venezuelana Briq.
- Arenaria vitoriana Uribe-Ech. & Alejandre

== See also ==
- Similar genera that have been taxonomically intertwined with Arenaria:
  - Spergula
  - Spergularia
