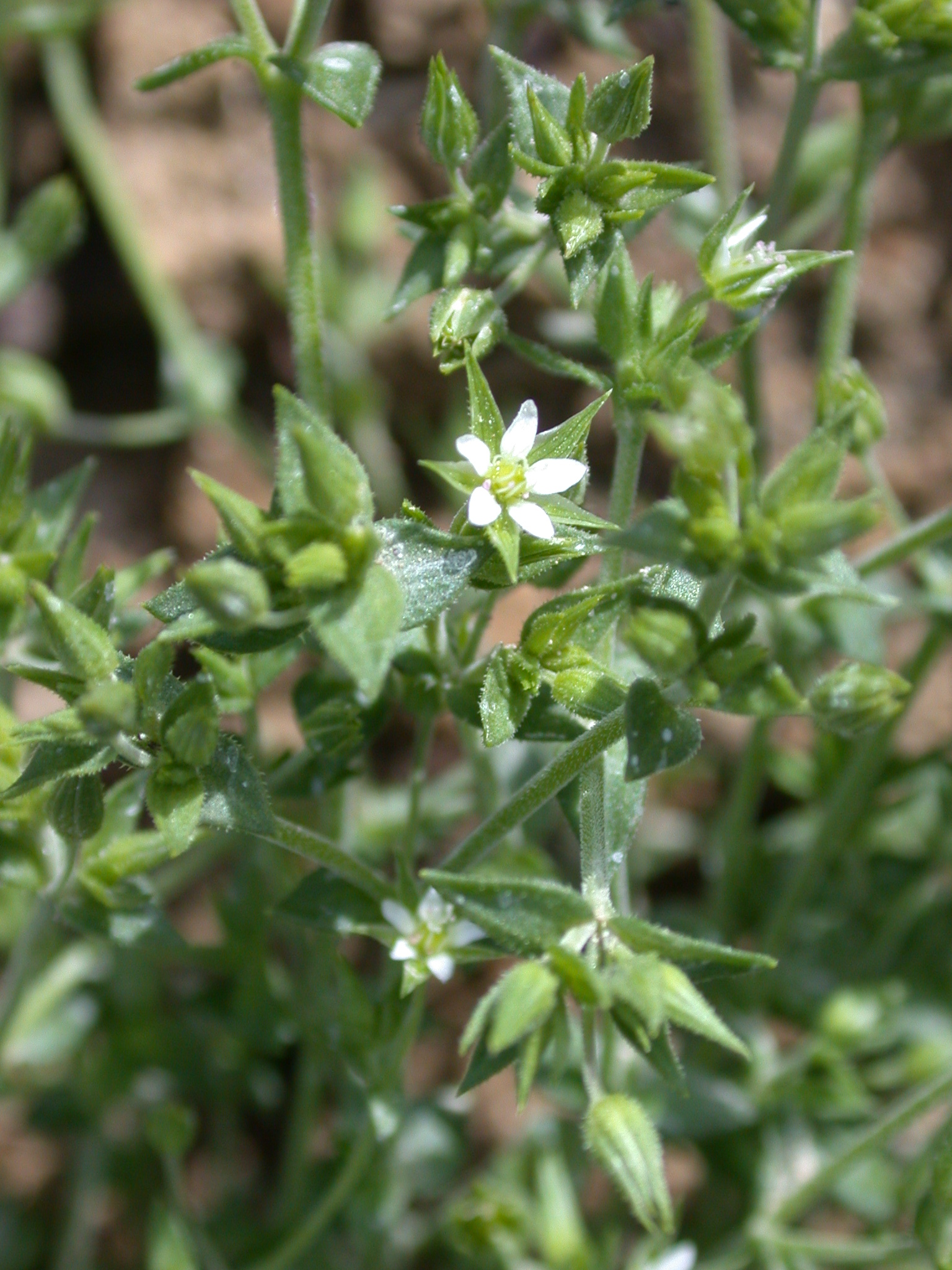

Scientific classification
- Kingdom: Plantae
- Clade: Tracheophytes
- Clade: Angiosperms
- Clade: Eudicots
- Order: Caryophyllales
- Family: Caryophyllaceae
- Genus: Arenaria
- Species: A. leptoclados

Binomial name
- Arenaria leptoclados (Rchb.) Guss.

Synonyms
- Synonyms list: Arenaria breviflora Gilib. (1782), opus utique oppr.; Arenaria cantabrica Amo (1873); Arenaria foliacea Turrill (1954); Arenaria gorgonea J.A.Schmidt (1852); Arenaria leptoclados var. lindbergii Sennen & Mauricio (1936); Arenaria leptoclados var. minutiflora (Loscos) Willk. (1893); Arenaria leptoclados subsp. minutiflora (Loscos) P.Monts. (1980 publ. 1981); Arenaria leptoclados var. viscidula (Roth) F.N.Williams (1898); Arenaria leptoclados subsp. viscidula (Roth) Holub (1983), nom. superfl.; Arenaria lloydii var. gracillima Willk. (1855), nom. illeg.; Arenaria minutiflora Loscos (1877); Arenaria serpyllifolia var. cantabrica (Amo) Nyman (1889); Arenaria serpyllifolia var. glutinosa Mert. & W.D.J.Koch (1831), nom. superfl.; Arenaria serpyllifolia subsp. glutinosa Arcang. (1882); Arenaria serpyllifolia var. gracillima Willk. (1878), nom. illeg.; Arenaria serpyllifolia var. leptoclados Rchb. (1841) (basionym); Arenaria serpyllifolia subsp. leptoclados (Rchb.) Nyman (1878); Arenaria serpyllifolia var. minutiflora (Loscos) Pit. & Proust (1909); Arenaria serpyllifolia subsp. minutiflora (Loscos) H.Lindb. (1932); Arenaria serpyllifolia var. prostrata Willk. (1851); Arenaria serpyllifolia var. tenuior Mert. & W.D.J.Koch (1831); Arenaria serpyllifolia subsp. tenuior (Mert. & W.D.J.Koch) Arcang. (1882); Arenaria serpyllifolia var. viscidula Roth (1827); Arenaria serpyllifolia var. viscidula Rouy & Foucaud (1896), nom. illeg.; Arenaria tenuior (Mert. & W.D.J.Koch) Gürke (1899); Arenaria tenuior var. balearica Sennen & Pau (1911); Arenaria tenuior var. minutiflora (Loscos) Gürke (1899); Arenaria viscidula (Roth) Tzvelev (2012), nom. illeg.; Arenaria zozii Kleopow (1939)

= Arenaria leptoclados =

Lesser thyme-leaved sandwort

Species of flowering plant in the carnation family

Arenaria leptoclados, the lesser thyme-leaved sandwort, is a species of flowering plant in the family Caryophyllaceae. It is an annual native to Europe, western and Central Asia, and northern and eastern Africa.

The decumbent annual herb typically grows to a height of 0.5 metres (2 ft) and produces white flowers when it blooms from late winter to spring.

Arenaria leptoclados' native range extends from Macaronesia through the Mediterranean Basin countries of southern Europe and North Africa to eastern Africa, the Arabian Peninsula, Western Asia and the Caucasus, and Central Asia as far as Siberia, Mongolia, and Pakistan, and through Central Europe to Ukraine and Central European Russia. It has been introduced to Scandinavia, Great Britain and Ireland, and the southeastern United States. It has also been introduced to Western Australia, Victoria, New South Wales and South Australia where it has become naturalised.
