= Arenaria funiculata =

Conservation status
- Endangered (IUCN 3.1)

Scientific classification
- Kingdom: Plantae
- Clade: Tracheophytes
- Clade: Angiosperms
- Clade: Eudicots
- Order: Caryophyllales
- Family: Caryophyllaceae
- Genus: Arenaria
- Species: A. funiculata

Binomial name
- Arenaria funiculata (Pau) Fior & P.O. Karis

Synonyms
- Moehringia fontqueri Pau; Moehringia tejedensis var. nevadensis Sennen

Species of flowering plant

Arenaria funiculata is a species of flowering plant in the family Caryophyllaceae. It is subshrub endemic to southern Spain. It is a hemicryptophyte which germinates or sprouts in May, and begins flowering in June at lower elevations and in August at higher ones. It is native to the Sierra Nevada from 1,850 to 2,450 metres elevation. It grows in cracks and crevices on rocky calcareous slopes, generally north-facing, and in sheltered ravines in south slopes. It forms a lithophyte plant community with Saxifraga nevadensis and other plants. It is threatened by habitat loss, and the IUCN Red List assesses the species as Endangered.

In 2007, Simone Fior and Per Ola Kampis proposed the transfer of Moehringia fontqueri from the genus Moehringia to the genus Arenaria, renaming the species Arenaria funiculata.
