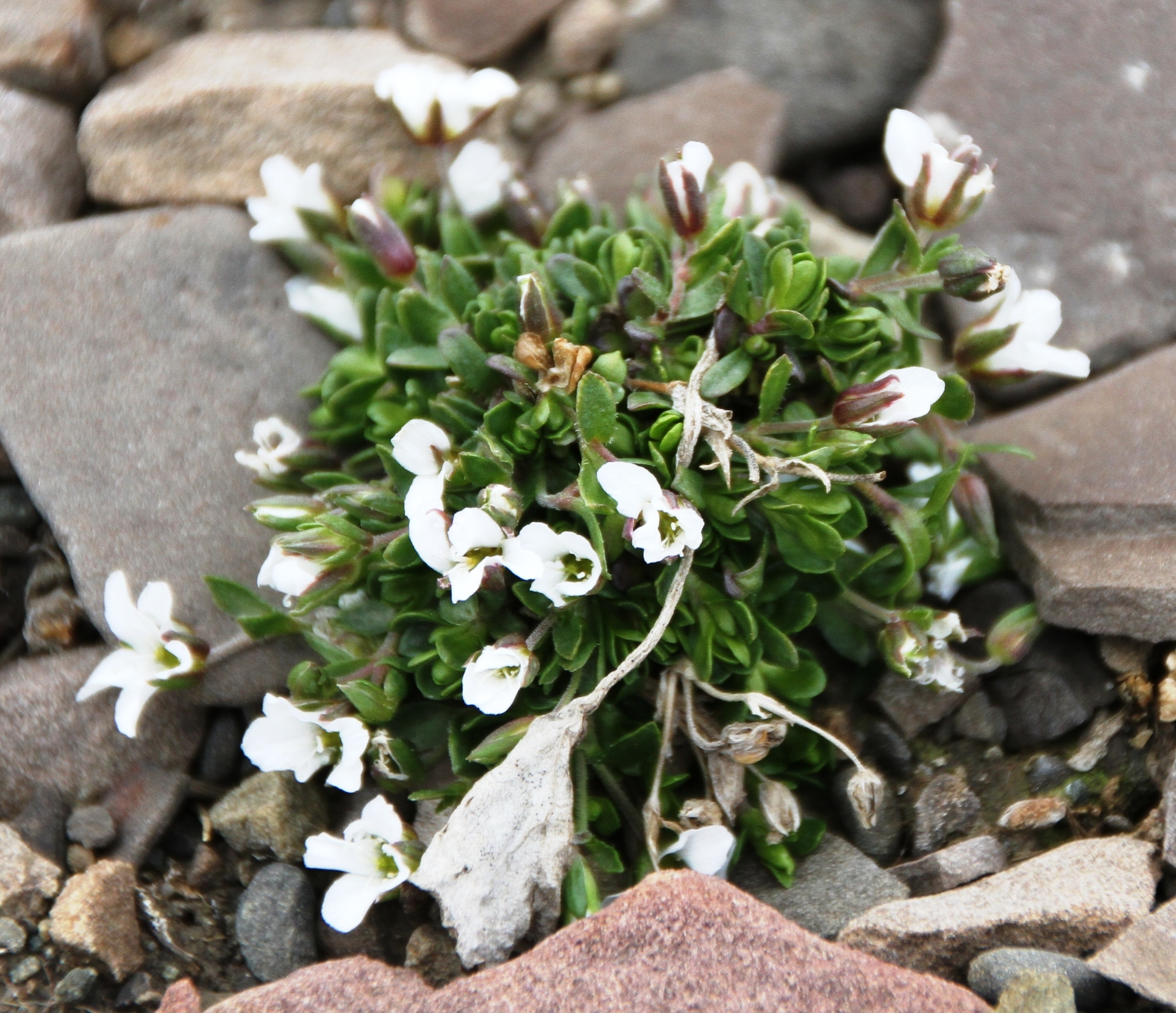

Scientific classification
- Kingdom: Plantae
- Clade: Tracheophytes
- Clade: Angiosperms
- Clade: Eudicots
- Order: Caryophyllales
- Family: Caryophyllaceae
- Genus: Arenaria
- Species: A. pseudofrigida

Binomial name
- Arenaria pseudofrigida (Ostenf. & O.C.Dahl) Steffen

= Arenaria pseudofrigida =

Species of flowering plant

Arenaria pseudofrigida is a species of flowering plant belonging to the family Caryophyllaceae.

Its native range is Subarctic.
