= Arenaria nevadensis =

Conservation status
- Critically Endangered (IUCN 3.1)

Scientific classification
- Kingdom: Plantae
- Clade: Tracheophytes
- Clade: Angiosperms
- Clade: Eudicots
- Order: Caryophyllales
- Family: Caryophyllaceae
- Genus: Arenaria
- Species: A. nevadensis

Binomial name
- Arenaria nevadensis Boiss. & Reut.

Species of plant in the carnation family

Arenaria nevadensis is a species of flowering plant in the family Caryophyllaceae. It is endemic to the Sierra Nevada of southern Spain. Its natural habitat is Mediterranean Matorral shrubby vegetation. It is threatened by habitat loss.
