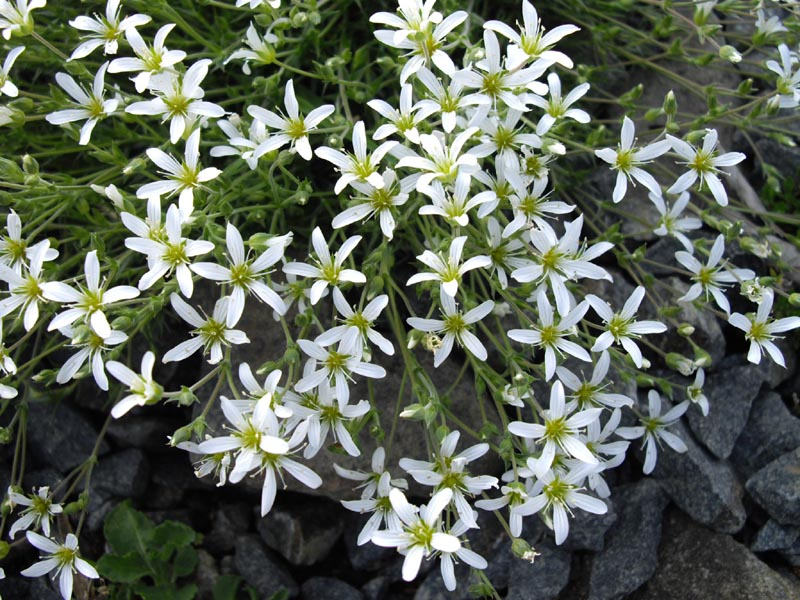

Scientific classification
- Kingdom: Plantae
- Clade: Tracheophytes
- Clade: Angiosperms
- Clade: Eudicots
- Order: Caryophyllales
- Family: Caryophyllaceae
- Genus: Arenaria
- Species: A. grandiflora

Binomial name
- Arenaria grandiflora L.

Synonyms
- Arenaria bolosii (Cañig.) L.Sáez & Rosselló; Alsinanthus grandiflorus (L.) Desv.; Cernohorskya grandiflora (L.) Á.Löve & D.Löve; Stellaria grandiflora (L.) Jess.

= Arenaria grandiflora =

Subspecies of flowering plant in the carnation family

Arenaria grandiflora is a species of plant in the family Caryophyllaceae. It is found in central and southern Europe, and north-western Africa. It has also been introduced to Germany.

== Subspecies ==
The following subspecies are recognised:

- Arenaria grandiflora subsp. bolosii (Cañig.) P.Küpfer – Spain. Critically Endangered.
- Arenaria grandiflora subsp. gomarica L.Sáez, J.M.Monts. & Rosselló – Morocco
- Arenaria grandiflora subsp. grandiflora L. – central and southern Europe, north-western Africa
- Arenaria grandiflora subsp. incrassata (Lange) C.Vicioso – northern Spain
- Arenaria grandiflora subsp. pseudoincrassata Malag. – Balearic Islands
- Arenaria grandiflora subsp. valentina (Boiss.) O.Bolòs & Vigo – south-eastern Spain
