= Mamoiada =

Mamoiada Mamujada (Sardinian)
- Comune
- Comune di Mamoiada
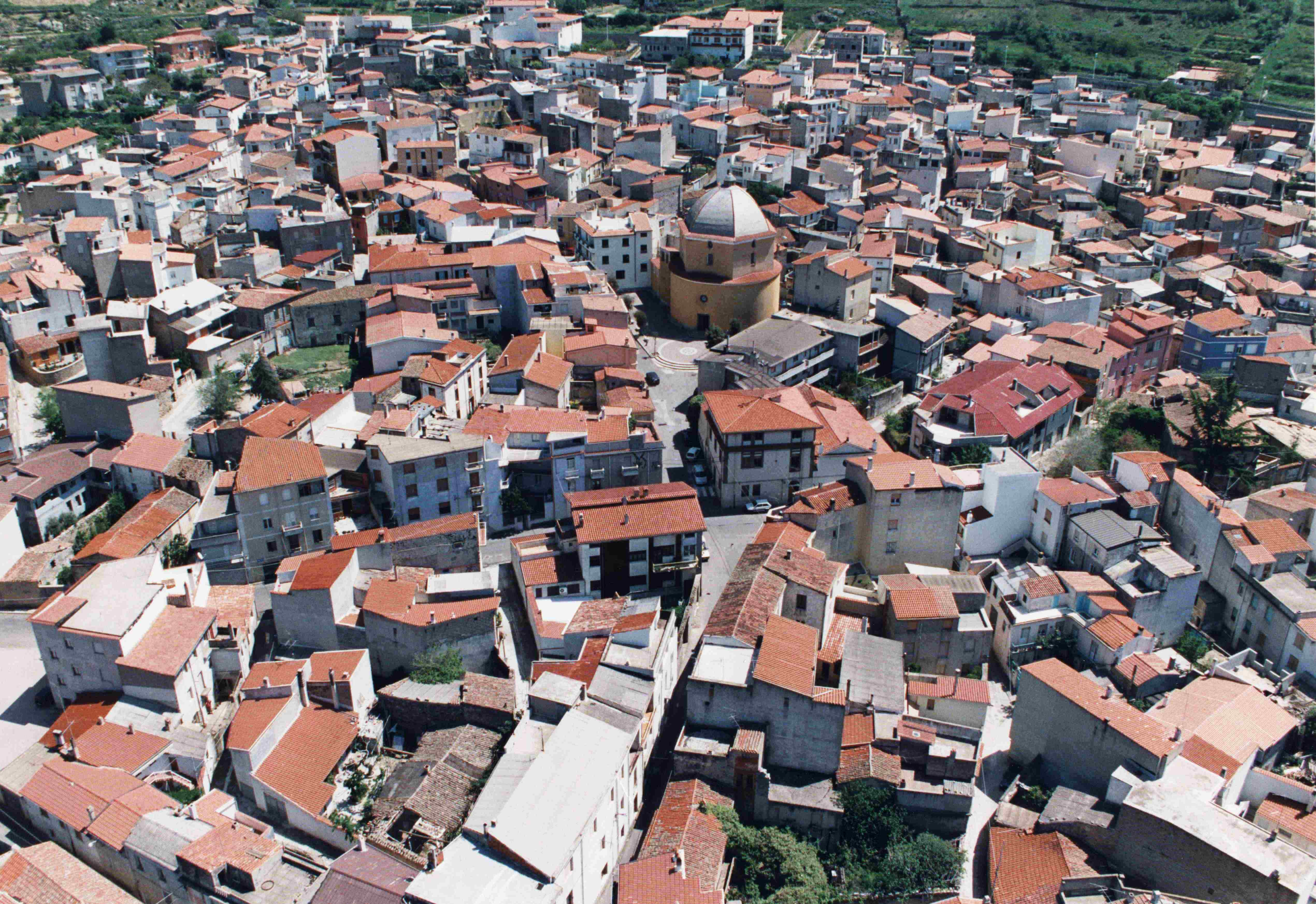
- View of Mamoiada

- Location within Italy Location within Sardinia
- Coordinates: 40°13′N 9°17′E
- Country: Italy
- Region: Sardinia
- Province: Province of Nuoro (NU)

Government
  - Mayor: Graziano Deiana

Area
  - Total: 48.83 km^{2} (18.85 sq mi)
- Elevation: 650 m (2,130 ft)

Population (2026)
  - Total: 2,349
  - Density: 48.11/km^{2} (124.6/sq mi)
- Time zone: UTC+1 (CET)
  - Summer (DST): UTC+2 (CEST)
- Postal code: 08024
- Dialing code: 0784

Mamoiada (Sardinian: Mamujada) is a town and comune (municipality) in the Province of Nuoro in the autonomous island region of Sardinia in Italy, located about 110 km (68 mi) north of Cagliari and about 12 km (7 mi) southwest of Nuoro. It has 2,349 inhabitants.

The town is known for its traditional carnival costumes, including distinctive masks worn by the mamuthones and issohadores. The local museum houses some masks also from other part of Sardinia and Europe.

Mamoiada borders the municipalities of Fonni, Gavoi, Nuoro, Ollolai, Orani, Orgosolo, and Sarule.

== Demographics ==
As of 2026, the population is 2,349, of which 49.3% are male, and 50.7% are female. Minors make up 16.7% of the population, and seniors make up 26.3%.

Historical population

Year	Pop.	±%
1861	1,927	—
1871	2,039	+5.8%
1881	2,060	+1.0%
1901	2,332	+13.2%
1911	2,632	+12.9%
1921	2,549	−3.2%
1931	2,724	+6.9%
1936	2,834	+4.0%

Year	Pop.	±%
1951	3,098	+9.3%
1961	3,233	+4.4%
1971	2,795	−13.5%
1981	2,713	−2.9%
1991	2,633	−2.9%
2001	2,580	−2.0%
2011	2,559	−0.8%
2021	2,426	−5.2%

Source: ISTAT

=== Immigration ===
As of 2025, immigrants make up 1.8% of the population. The 5 largest foreign countries of birth are France, Germany, Romania, Switzerland, and Mali.

== Culture ==
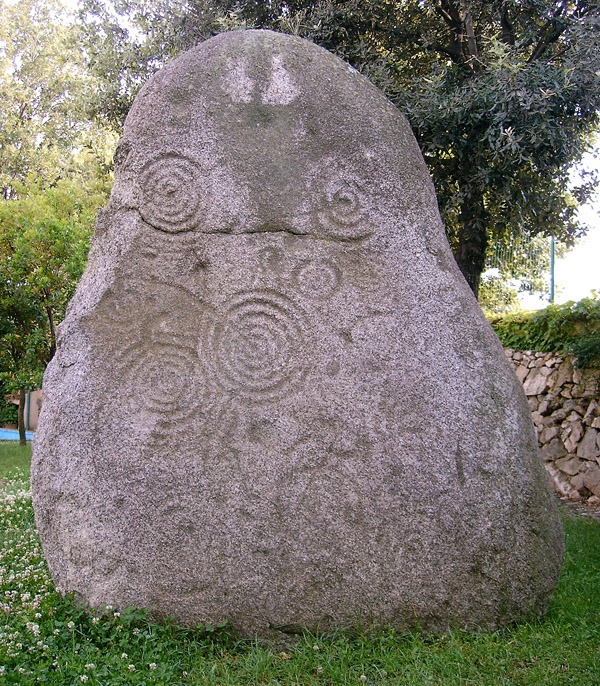
Menhir of Perda Pinta

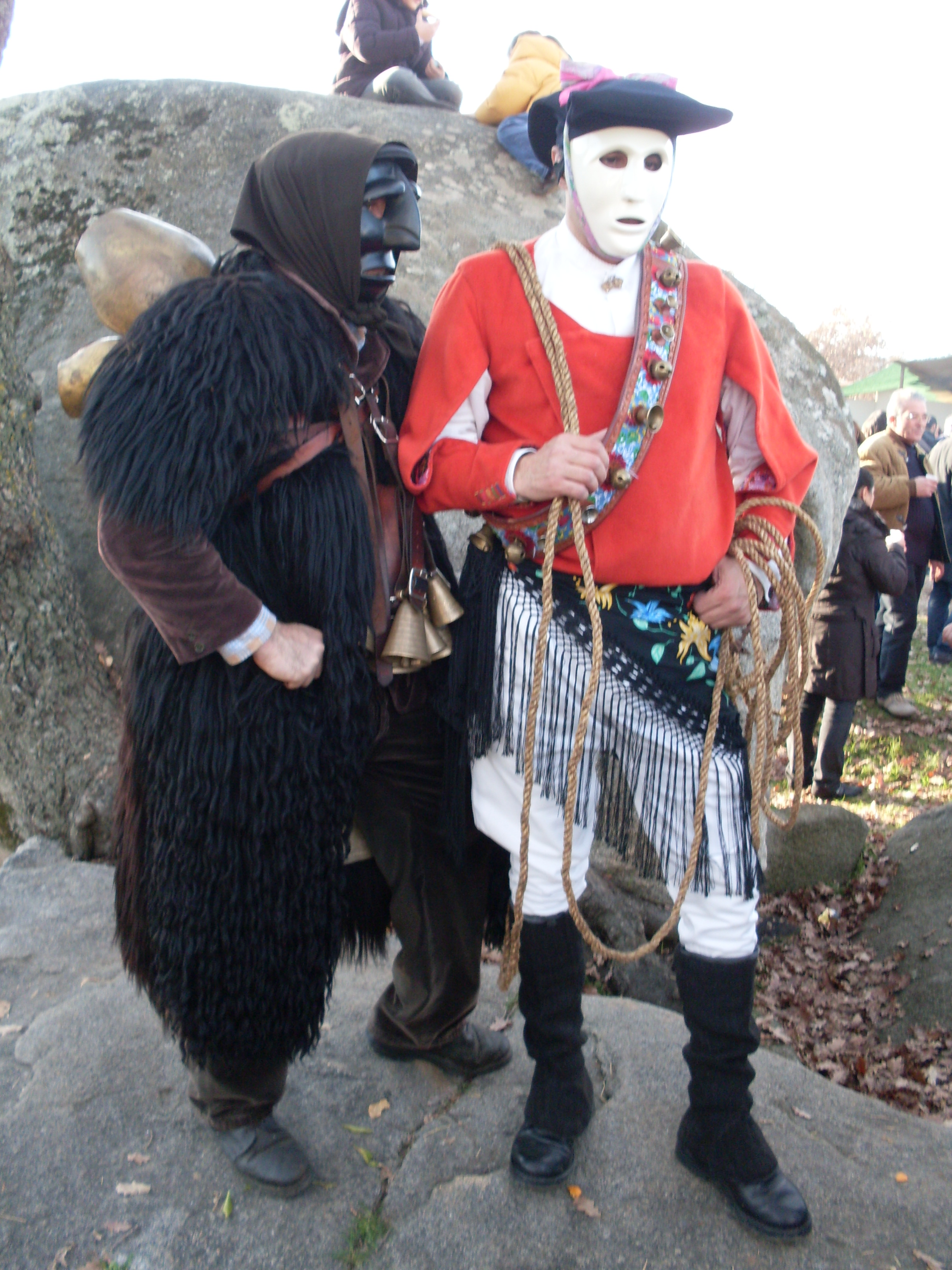
The Mamuthones and the Issohadores (Traditional carnival mask from Mamoiada)

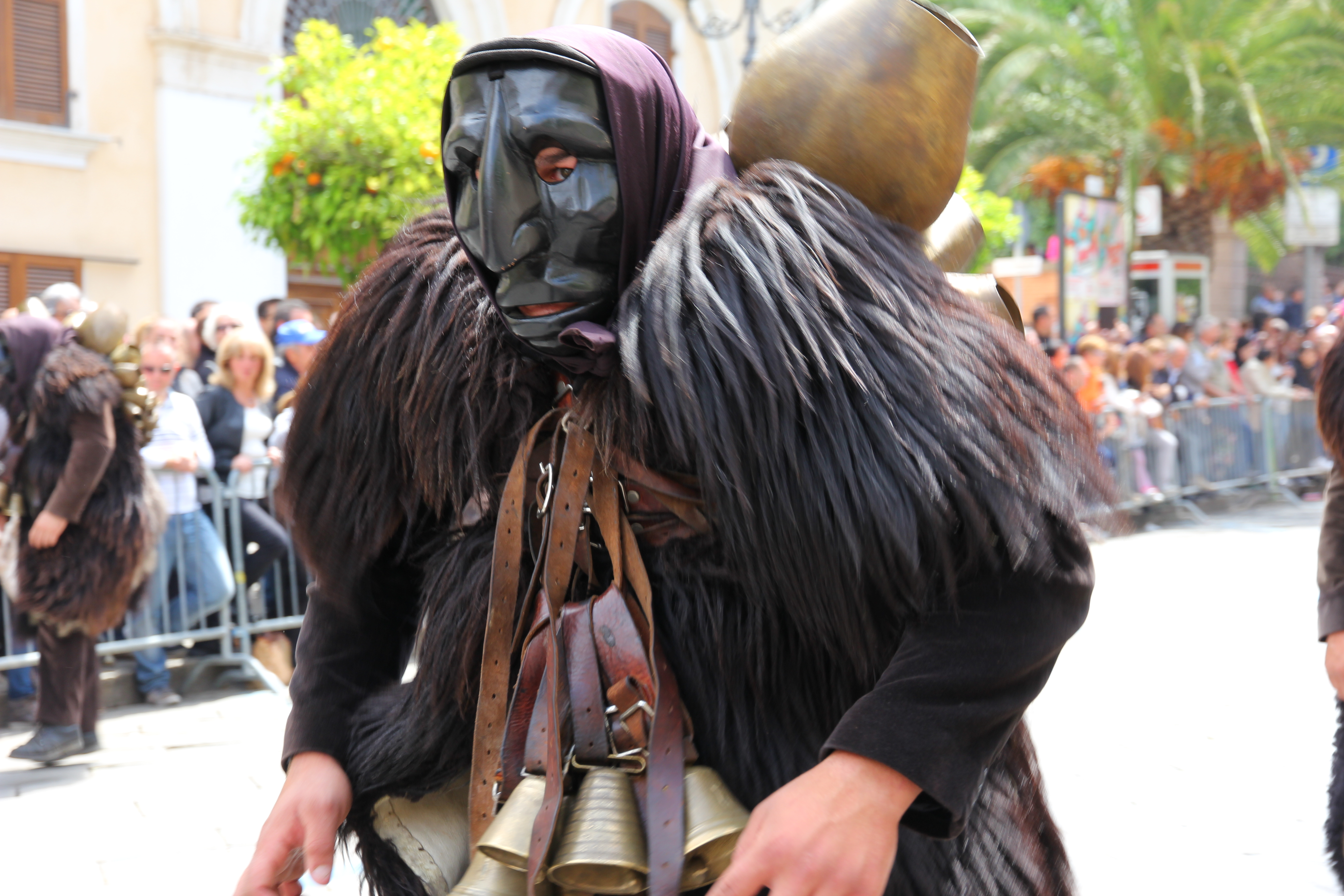
Mamuthone, the typical mask of Mamoiada

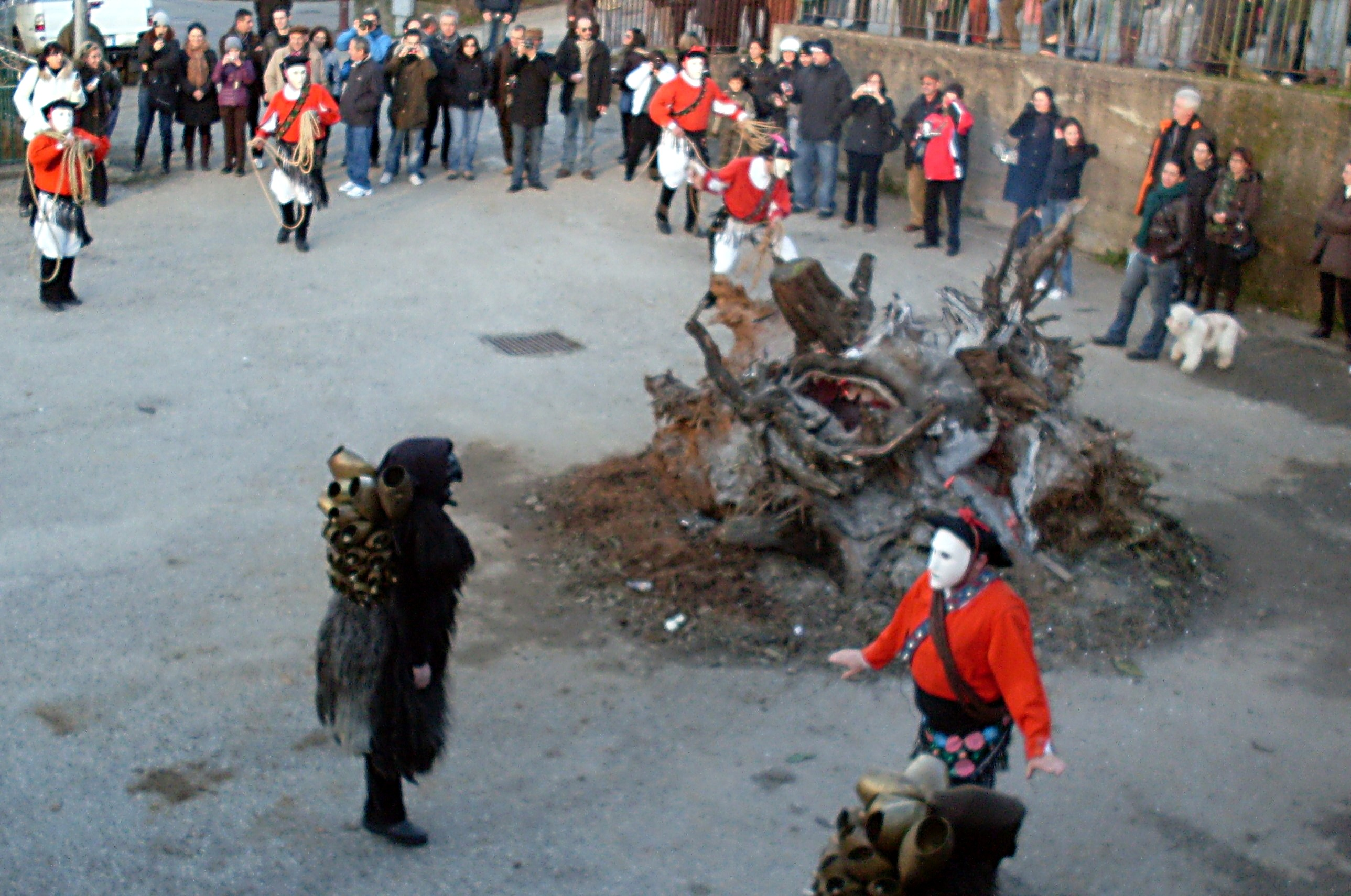
Mamuthones and Issohadores around the fire in honor of Saint Anthony

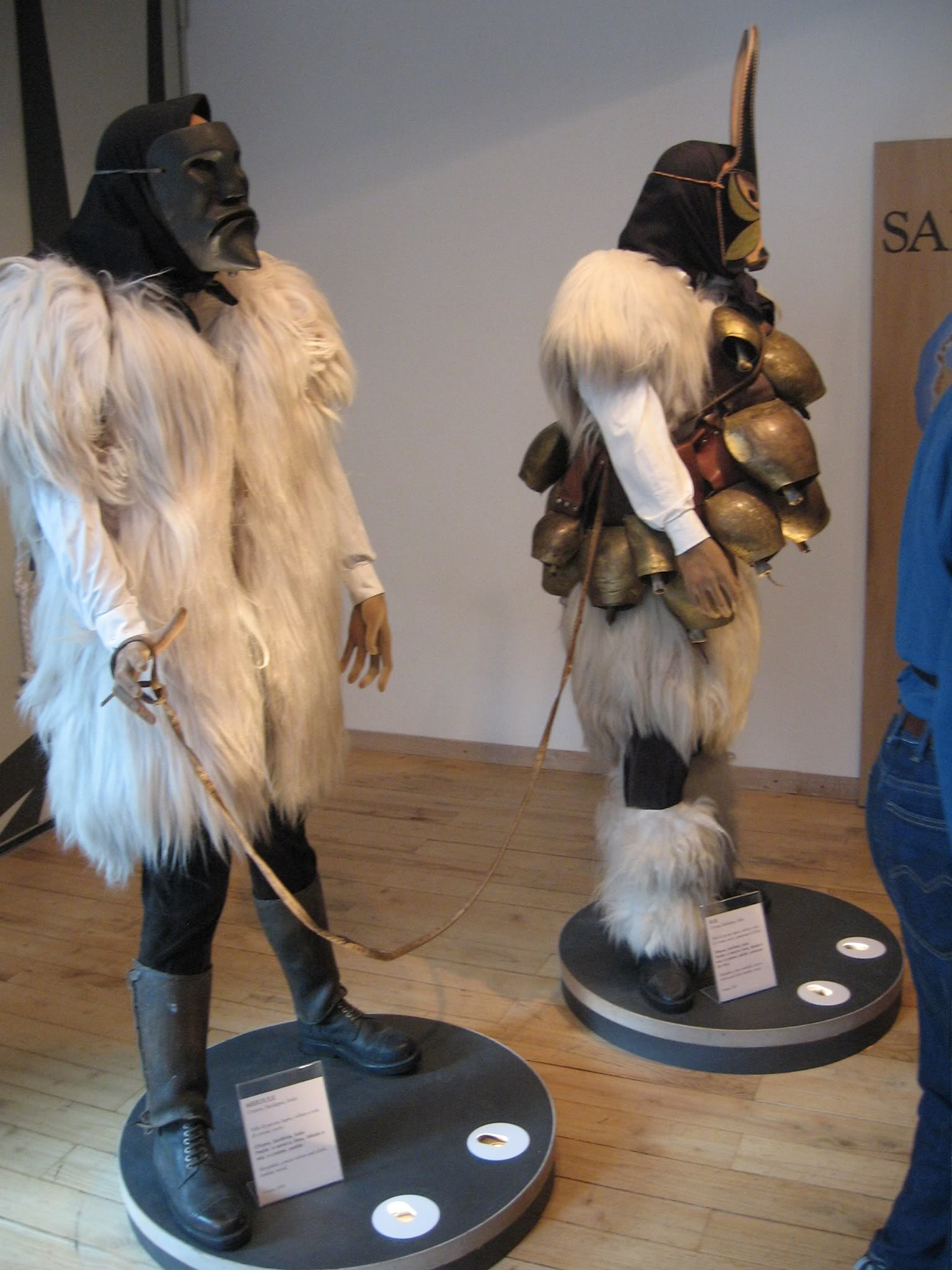
Museum of mediterranean masks
