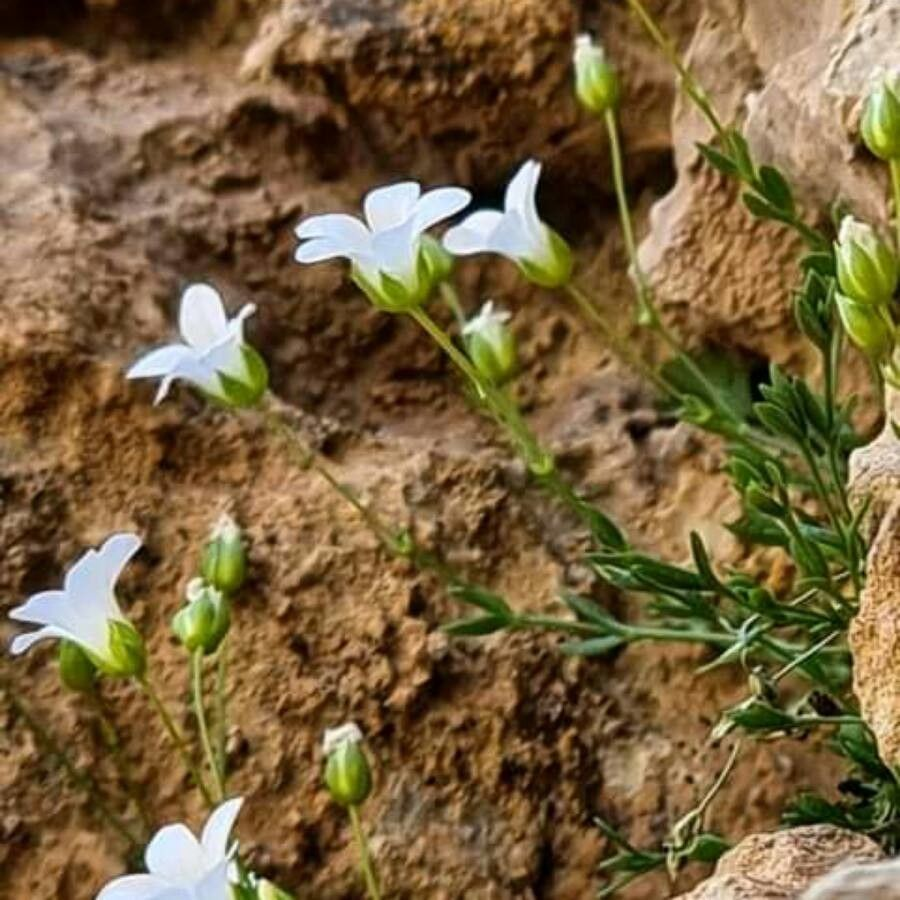

Conservation status
- Endangered (IUCN 3.1)

Scientific classification
- Kingdom: Plantae
- Clade: Embryophytes
- Clade: Tracheophytes
- Clade: Spermatophytes
- Clade: Angiosperms
- Clade: Eudicots
- Order: Caryophyllales
- Family: Caryophyllaceae
- Genus: Arenaria
- Species: A. libanotica

Binomial name
- Arenaria libanotica Kotschy

Synonyms
- Arenaria adonidis Peyron ex Post

= Arenaria libanotica =

Species of plant

Arenaria libanotica, commonly known as Lebanon sandwort (Arabic: زهرة رمال لبنانية), is a species of flowering plant in the family Caryophyllaceae. This species was first described by Kotschy in 1867.

Arenaria libanotica blooms in June and July; its small flowers are white and hermaphrodite flowers. It is endemic to the mountains of Lebanon.
