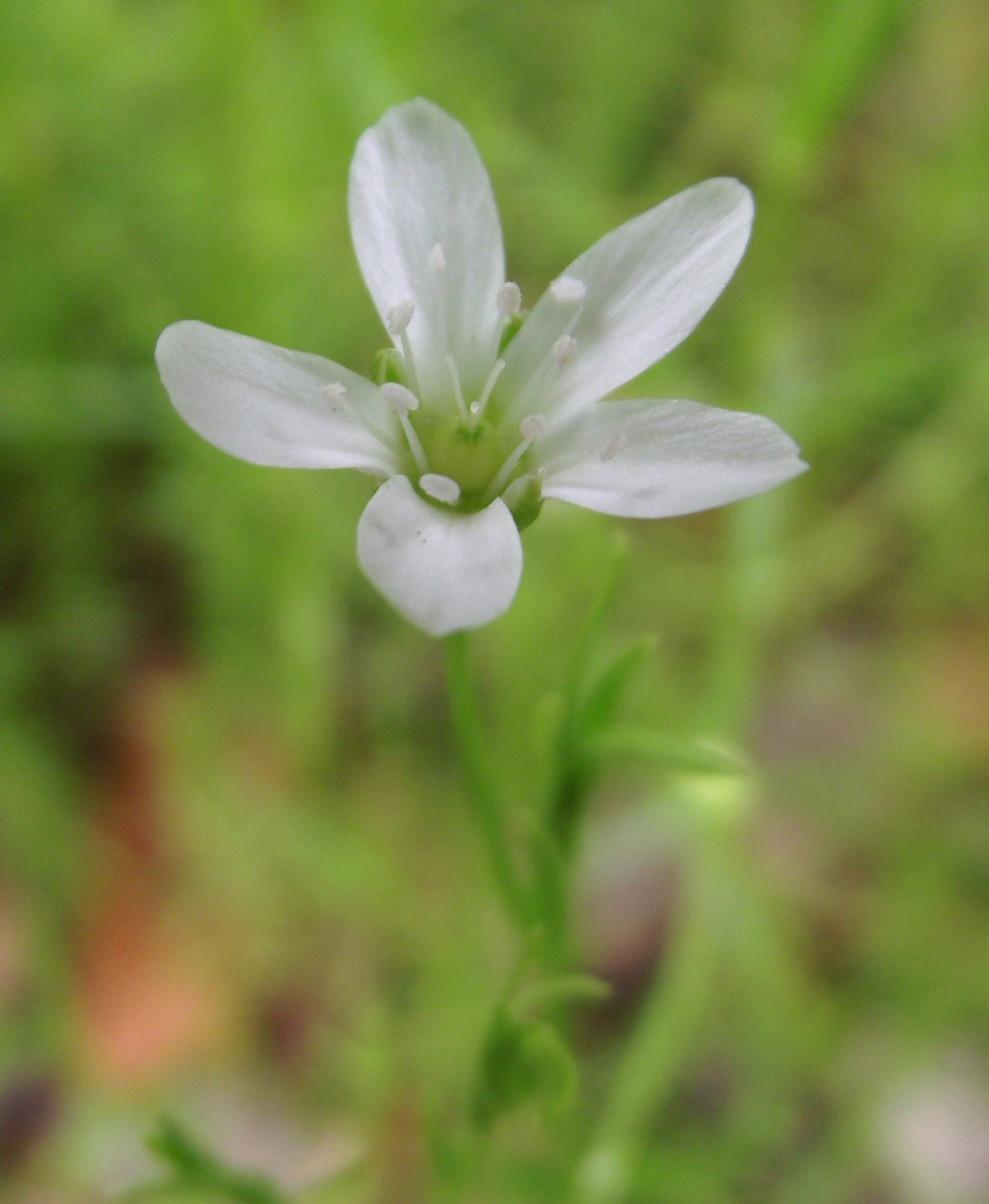

Conservation status
- Endangered (ESA)

Scientific classification
- Kingdom: Plantae
- Clade: Tracheophytes
- Clade: Angiosperms
- Clade: Eudicots
- Order: Caryophyllales
- Family: Caryophyllaceae
- Genus: Arenaria
- Species: A. paludicola

Binomial name
- Arenaria paludicola B.L.Rob.

= Arenaria paludicola =

Species of flowering plant

Arenaria paludicola is a species of flowering plant in the family Caryophyllaceae known by the common names marsh sandwort and swamp sandwort. The plant grows in wet areas, such as marsh and bog.

== Distribution ==
It is native to the west coast of North America in California, where it is known from only a few remaining occurrences in the Central Coast of California region. It is a federally listed endangered species in the United States. It is present in two native locations in San Luis Obispo County, California, and it has been reintroduced nearby in Nipomo and Los Osos. It is known from historical occurrences in Washington, but it may have been extirpated from that state. The plant may still exist in northern Mexico, but these occurrences are unconfirmed.

== Description ==
This is a perennial herb which grows erect or trailing and draping over nearby plants and other objects for support. The slender stems are hairless and shiny, sometimes grooved, and approach 90 centimeters in maximum length. The stem has nodes at intervals and the nodes may root. Leaves are very narrow and lance-shaped.

The inflorescence is composed of a single white flower. The fruit is a toothed capsule containing up to 20 tiny brown kidney-shaped seeds. Threats to the survival of this species include the destruction and alteration of its wetland habitat, shrinking of the local water table, and human activities such as off-roading.
