= Arenaria livermorensis =

Scientific classification
- Kingdom: Plantae
- Clade: Embryophytes
- Clade: Tracheophytes
- Clade: Spermatophytes
- Clade: Angiosperms
- Clade: Eudicots
- Order: Caryophyllales
- Family: Caryophyllaceae
- Genus: Arenaria
- Species: A. livermorensis

Binomial name
- Arenaria livermorensis Correll

Species of flowering plant

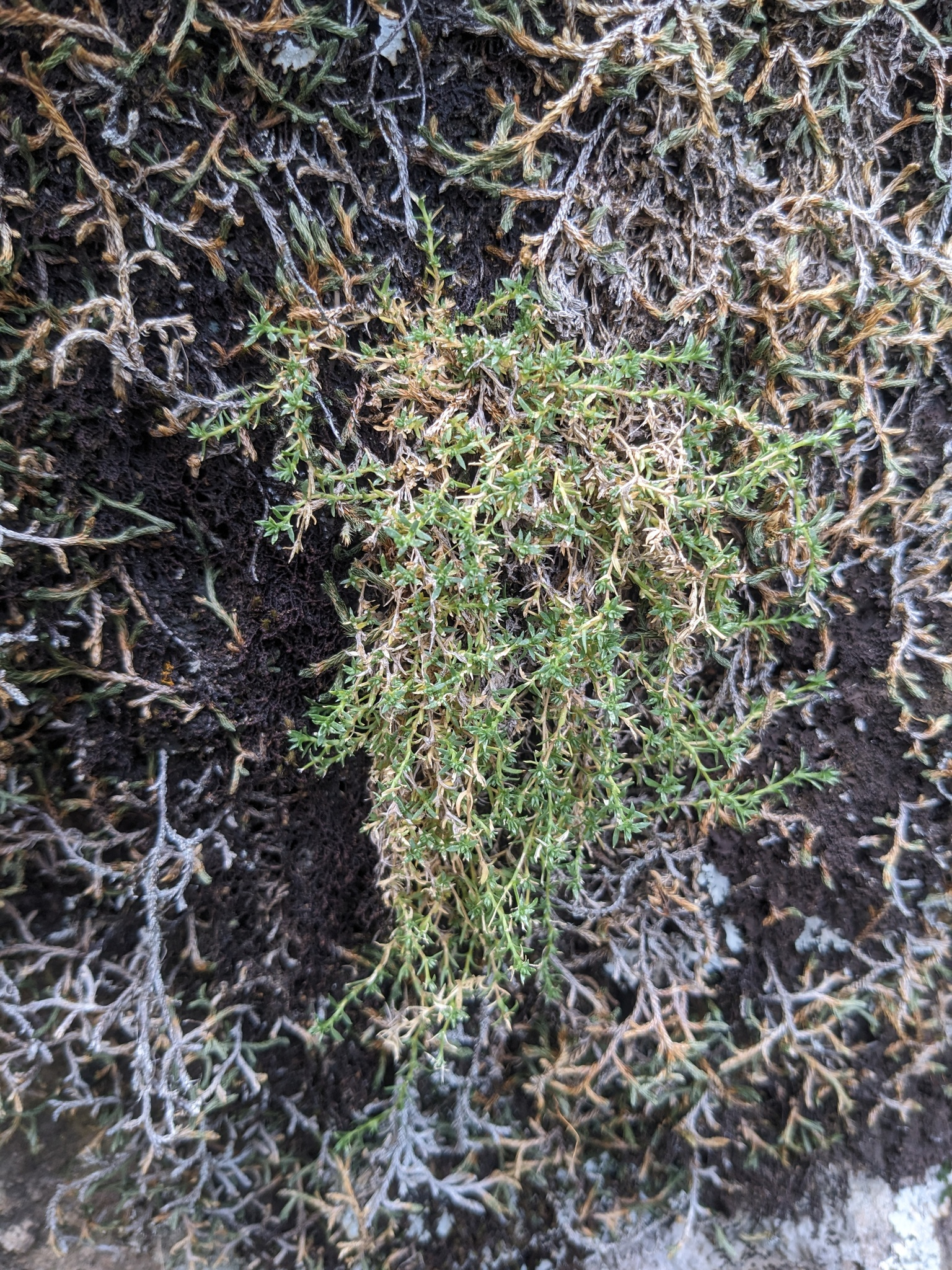
Livermore Sandwort (Arenaria livermorensis) in Jeff Davis, Texas, United States.

Arenaria livermorensis, common name Livermore sandwort, is a plant species endemic to the Davis Mountains in Jeff Davis County in western Texas. It grows in cracks in cliff faces at elevations of 2100–2500 m.

Arenaria livermorensis is a perennial herb growing close to the ground and forming a mat, rather resembling moss. Stems can attain a length of 4 cm. The leaves are needle-like, narrow and rigid, up to 6 mm long, hairless but with peg-like cilia along the margins, green and shiny. The flowers are solitary in the axils of the leaves, with green sepals and no petals.
