= Sarule =

- Comune
- Comune di Sarule
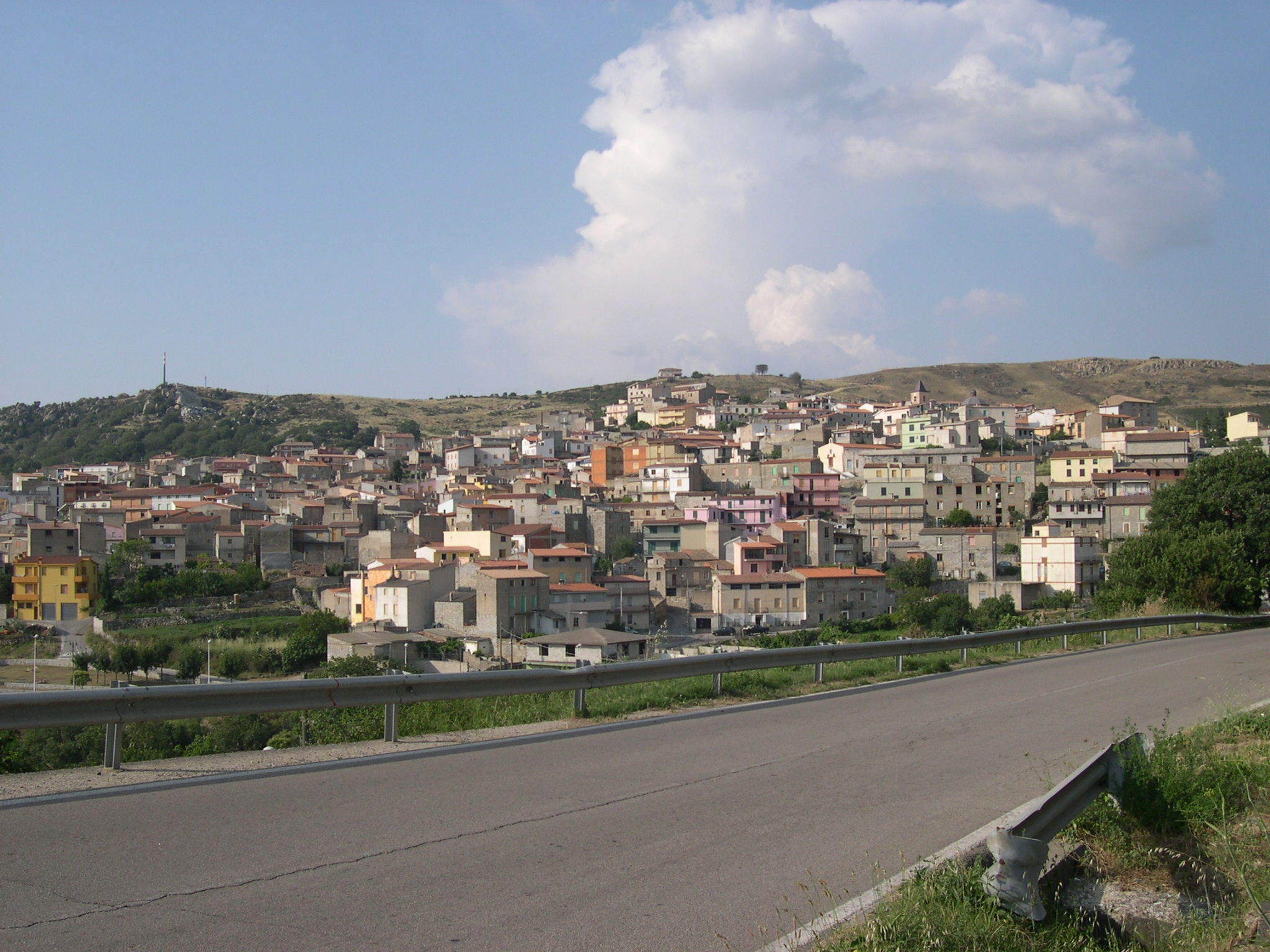
- View of Sarule

- Location within Sardinia
- Coordinates: 40°14′N 9°10′E
- Country: Italy
- Region: Sardinia
- Province: Nuoro (NU)

Area
  - Total: 52.72 km^{2} (20.36 sq mi)
- Elevation: 700 m (2,300 ft)

Population (2026)
  - Total: 1,450
  - Density: 27.5/km^{2} (71.2/sq mi)
- Demonym: Sarulesi
- Time zone: UTC+1 (CET)
  - Summer (DST): UTC+2 (CEST)
- Postal code: 08020
- Dialing code: 0784
- Website: Official website

Sarule is a town and comune (municipality) in the Province of Nuoro in the autonomous island region of Sardinia in Italy, located about 170 kilometres (110 mi) north of Cagliari and about 15 kilometres (9 mi) southwest of Nuoro. It has 1,450 inhabitants.

Sarule borders the municipalities of Mamoiada, Ollolai, Olzai, Orani, and Ottana.

== Demographics ==
As of 2026, the population is 1,450, of which 48.4% are male, and 51.6% are female. Minors make up 11.4% of the population, and seniors make up 30.6%.

Historical population

Year	Pop.	±%
1861	1,425	—
1871	1,518	+6.5%
1881	1,718	+13.2%
1901	1,879	+9.4%
1911	1,870	−0.5%
1921	1,928	+3.1%
1931	2,090	+8.4%
1936	2,108	+0.9%

Year	Pop.	±%
1951	2,349	+11.4%
1961	2,475	+5.4%
1971	2,227	−10.0%
1981	2,215	−0.5%
1991	2,016	−9.0%
2001	1,905	−5.5%
2011	1,770	−7.1%
2021	1,564	−11.6%

Source: ISTAT

=== Immigration ===
As of 2025, immigrants make up 5.5% of the population. The 5 largest foreign countries of birth are Romania, France, Ivory Coast, Mali, and Senegal.

== See also ==
- Monte Gonare
