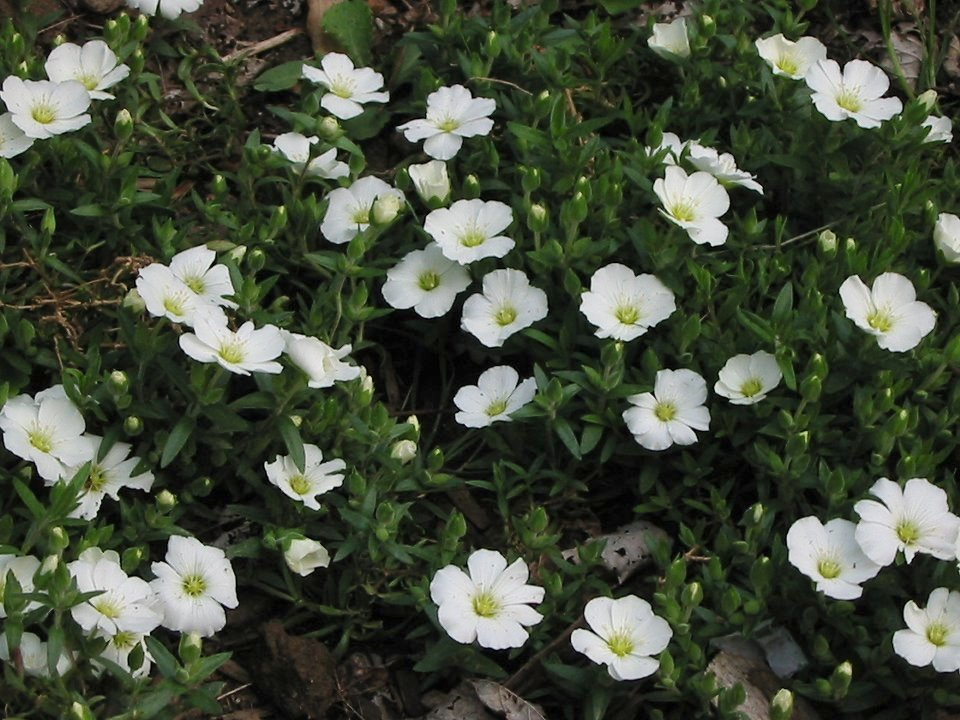

Scientific classification
- Kingdom: Plantae
- Clade: Tracheophytes
- Clade: Angiosperms
- Clade: Eudicots
- Order: Caryophyllales
- Family: Caryophyllaceae
- Genus: Arenaria
- Species: A. montana

Binomial name
- Arenaria montana Sieber ex Steud

= Arenaria montana =

Species of flowering plant

Arenaria montana, the mountain sandwort, is a species of flowering plant in the family Caryophyllaceae, native to mountainous regions of southwestern Europe, from the Pyrenees to Portugal. The Latin specific epithet montana refers to mountains or coming from mountains.

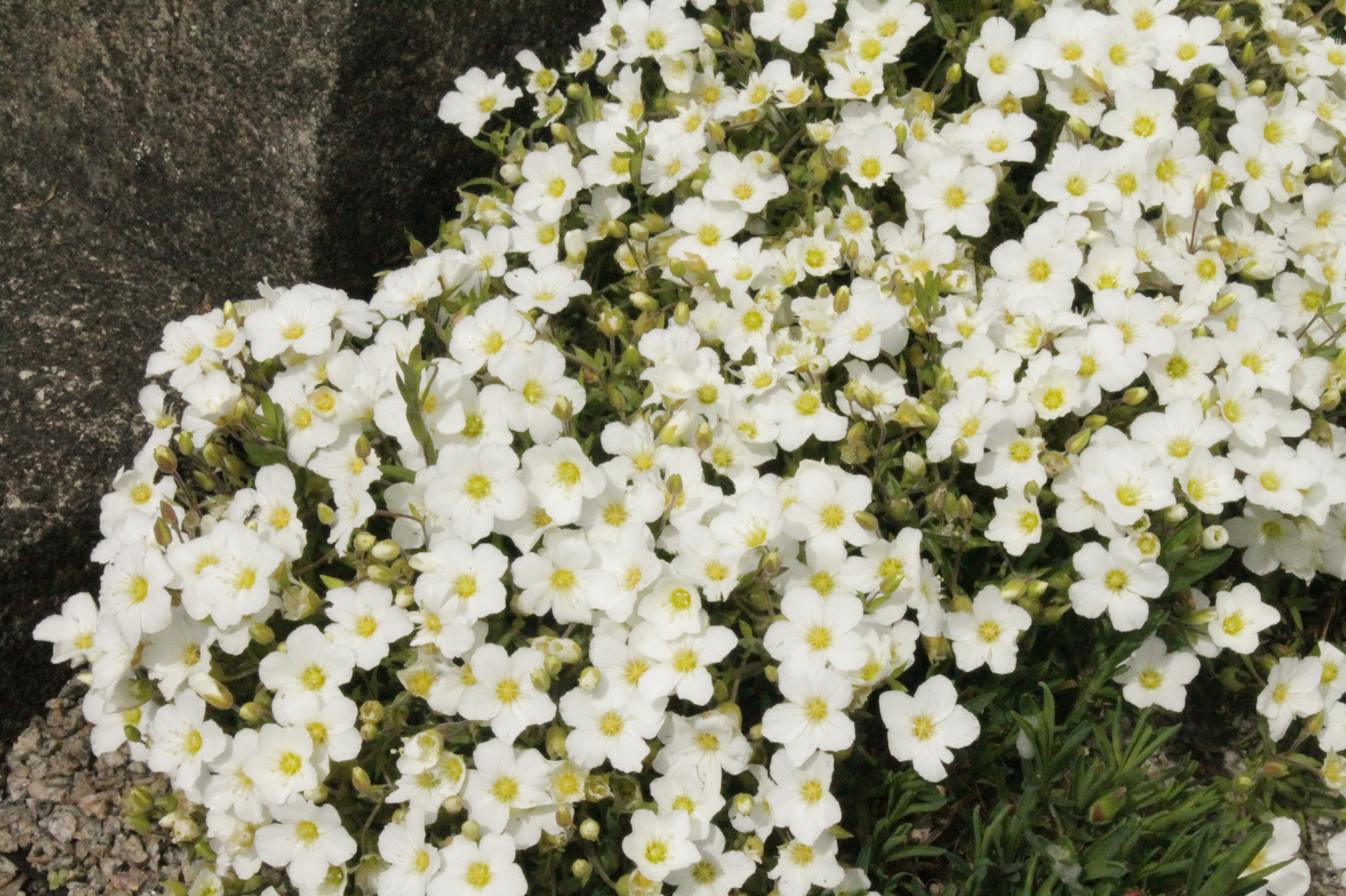
Arenaria Montana in bloom

== Description ==
Arenaria montana is an evergreen perennial growing 14–22 cm (6–9 in) tall, with lanceolate or ovate green to grayish-green opposite leaves 10–30 mm (0.4–1.2 in) in length.

From mid to late Spring it produces dense clumps of white to near-white flowers approximately 25 mm (1 in) in diameter borne on cymes of 2 to 10 flowers each.

Arenaria montana prefers well drained, sandy to sandy loam soils, of moderate (pH 5.5 to 7.5) acidity. It also prefers moist soils, as its shallow root system leaves it vulnerable to drought.

This plant has gained the Royal Horticultural Society's Award of Garden Merit.
