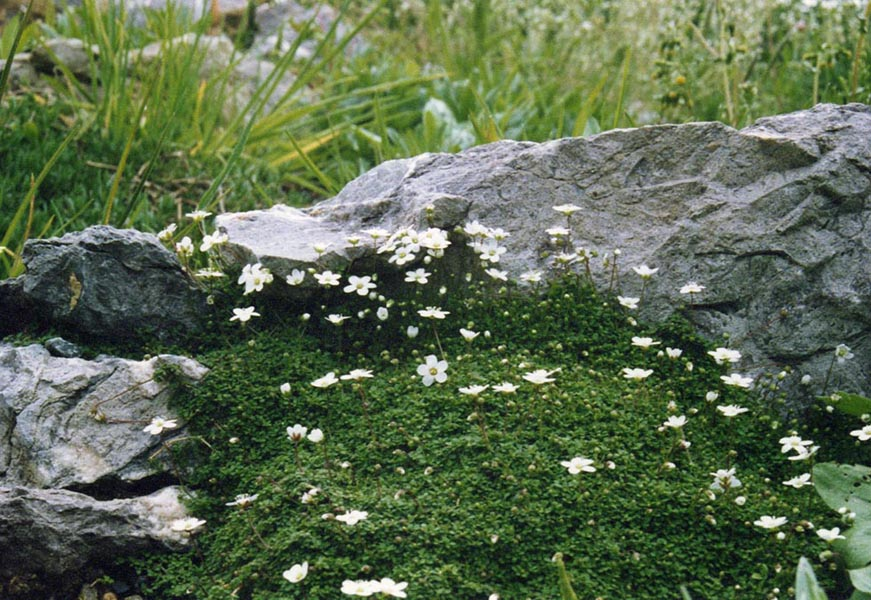

Scientific classification
- Kingdom: Plantae
- Clade: Tracheophytes
- Clade: Angiosperms
- Clade: Eudicots
- Order: Caryophyllales
- Family: Caryophyllaceae
- Genus: Arenaria
- Species: A. balearica

Binomial name
- Arenaria balearica L.

Synonyms
- Alsinanthus balearicus (L.) Desv.; Arenaria corsica Steud.

= Arenaria balearica =

Species of flowering plant

Arenaria balearica, the mossy sandwort, is a species of flowering plant in the family Caryophyllaceae, native to the Balearic Islands, Corsica, Sardinia and mainland Italy. It was first described by Carl Linnaeus in 1768.
