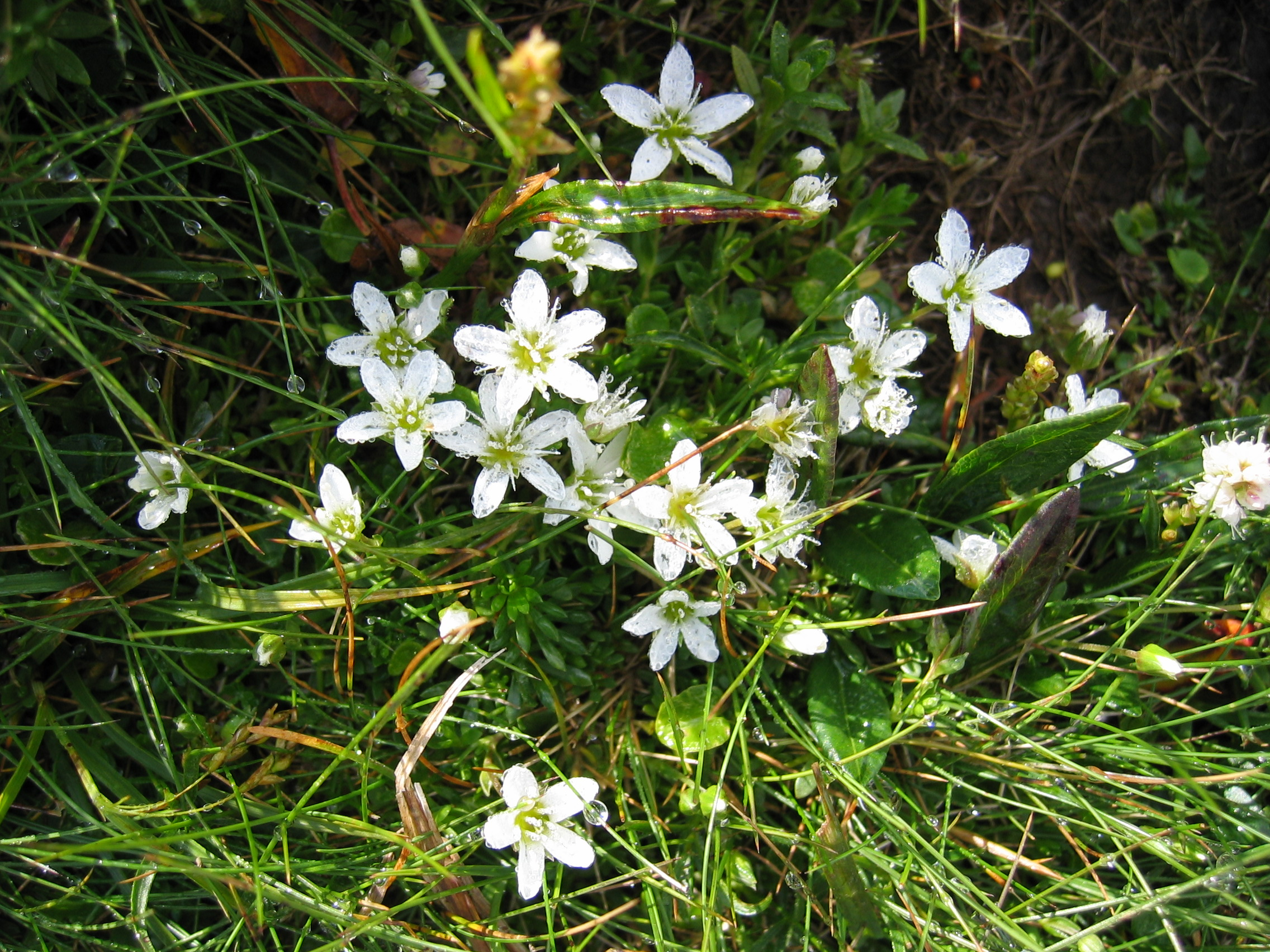

Scientific classification
- Kingdom: Plantae
- Clade: Tracheophytes
- Clade: Angiosperms
- Clade: Eudicots
- Order: Caryophyllales
- Family: Caryophyllaceae
- Genus: Arenaria
- Species: A. ciliata

Binomial name
- Arenaria ciliata L.

= Arenaria ciliata =

Species of flowering plant

Arenaria ciliata, the fringed sandwort, is a perennial herb of the family Caryophyllaceae. It is a calcicole occurring in open grassland and on bare rock in mountainous areas.

== Distribution ==
It is European with an outlying population in Greenland. This species is not known from Britain. It was discovered in Ireland in 1806 growing on Ben Bulben in County Sligo. This remains the only known Irish population.
