= Paul Rohrbach (botanist) =

Paul Rohrbach (June 9, 1846 – June 6, 1871) was a German botanist born in Berlin. He wrote on orchids before dying in his 20s.

== Background ==
Rohrbach studied the sciences at the University of Göttingen, where one of his instructors was August Grisebach. He later studied botany under Alexander Braun at the University of Berlin. Braun was an important influence on Rohrbach's research in the fields of comparative morphology and systematics.

While a student Rohrbach published a work on the orchid genus Epipogium titled Über den Blüthenbau und die Befruchtung von Epipogium Gmelini. He was also the author of a treatise on the genus Silene called Monographie der Gattung Silene. He died in Berlin of lung disease a few days before his 25th birthday.
