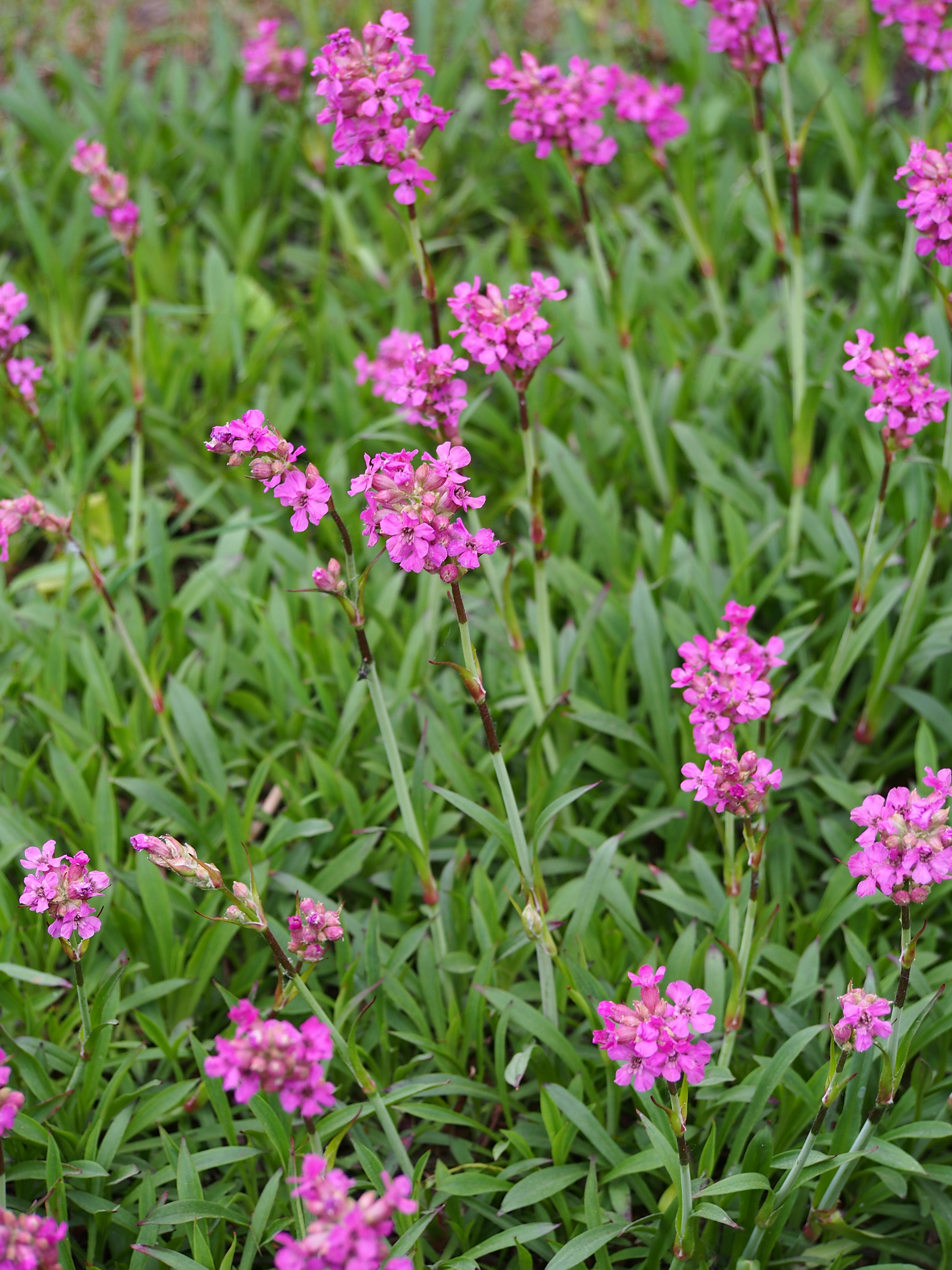
- Viscaria vulgaris

Scientific classification
- Kingdom: Plantae
- Clade: Tracheophytes
- Clade: Angiosperms
- Clade: Eudicots
- Order: Caryophyllales
- Family: Caryophyllaceae
- Tribe: Sileneae
- Genus: Viscaria; Bernh.

Species
- See text

Synonyms
- Liponeurum Schott, Nyman & Kotschy; Steris Adans.

= Viscaria =

Genus of plants in the carnation family

Viscaria is a genus of flowering plants in the family Caryophyllaceae, native to Canada, Greenland, Iceland, Europe, Kazakhstan, and western Siberia. Molecular studies attempting to resolve relationships in the tribe Sileneae have found that Viscaria is closely genetically related to the genus Atocion, but is quite distinct from it morphologically.

== Species ==
Currently accepted species include:

- Viscaria alpina (L.) G.Don
- Viscaria asterias (Griseb.) Frajman
- Viscaria × media Fr. ex Svanlund
- Viscaria vulgaris Röhl.
