= Arthur's Seat footpaths =

Footpaths in Edinburgh, Scotland

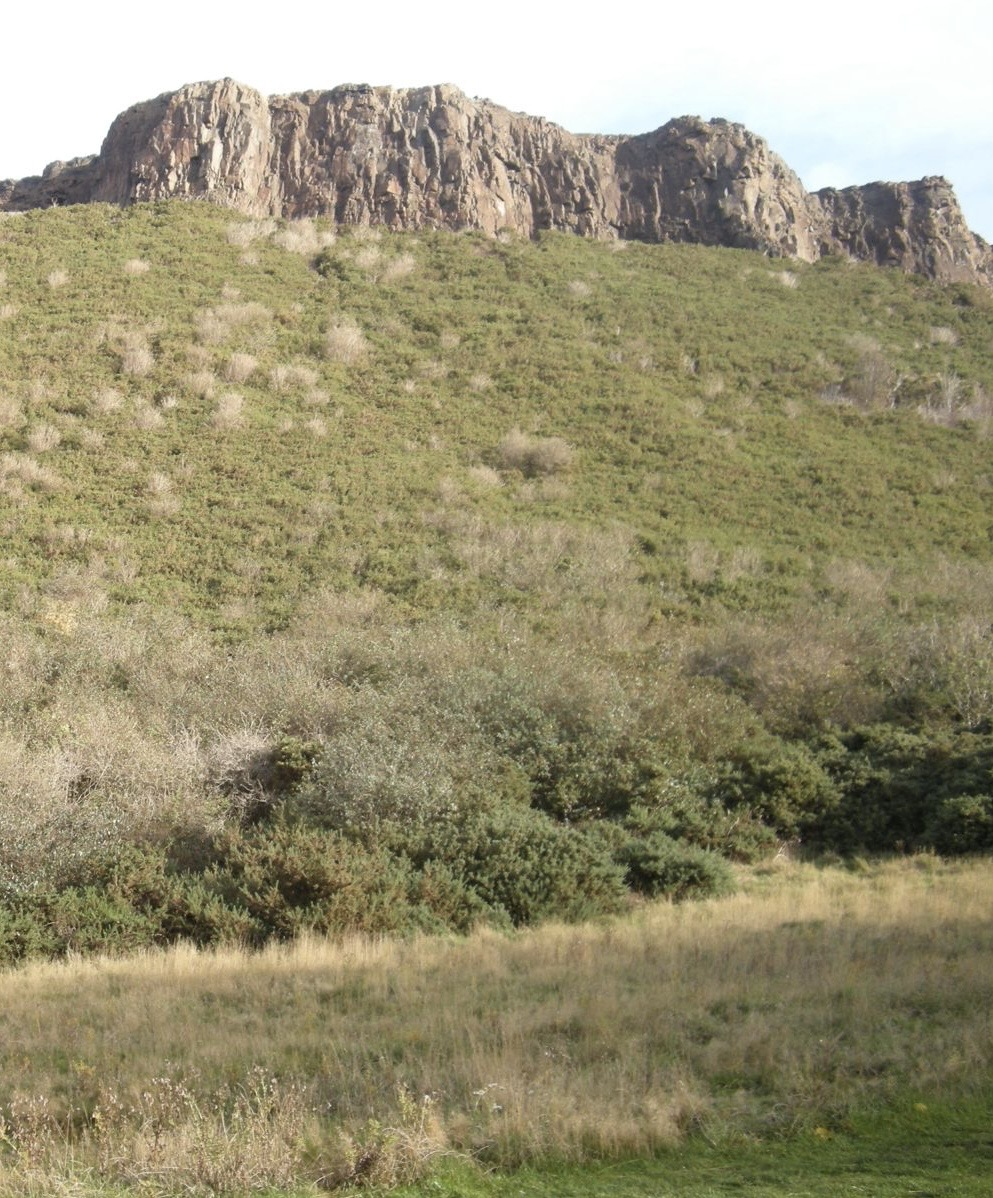
Arthur's Seat during a sunny day

Arthur's Seat footpaths form a network of trails within Holyrood Park, providing various routes up to the summit with different levels of difficulty. These paths offer fantastic panoramic views of Edinburgh and can be enjoyed throughout the year, though some sections have steep slopes and slippery rocks where walkers need to be cautious. The paths cross a rugged landscape shaped by the ancient Arthur's Seat volcano. The park's cliffs, craggy peaks and grassy valleys reflect the long geological history of eruptions and erosion that shaped this area at the heart of Scotland's capital.

These footpaths are important for both recreation and tourism, offering year-round public access to Edinburgh’s highest point. They attract locals, students, and visitors from around the world looking for a good walk, spectacular views over the city, and a natural escape from the urban environment. The trails also complement the cultural sites nearby, including Holyrood Palace and the Scottish Parliament, making the park a central part of the experience for anyone visiting Edinburgh.

The morphology of the Arthur's Seat footpaths reflects the park's volcanic origins, with steep slopes and friable rock formed by ancient lava flows and magma intrusions. This is the history behind rugged terrain, cliffs, and uneven surfaces that define the trails and contribute to their scenic appeal.

== Getting to Holyrood Park ==
Holyrood Park has several entrances, but the most common approaches on foot are:

- From the Royal Mile: enter next to Holyrood Palace; this is the starting point for both Red and Blue routes. From the Commonwealth Pool / Pollock Halls: use the Holyrood Park Road entrance, which leads directly to the Purple route.

== Main footpath ==
Length	Duration	Difficulty	Ascent
2.5 miles (4 km)	approx. 2 hours	moderate	230 m

The main summit route begins on Queen's Drive next to Holyrood Palace, at Broad Pavement, EH8 8AZ. Parking is available at £1 per hour (no weekend charge), and the route is accessible via public transport, with Lothian Buses service no. 35 running to Canongate Kirk, a short walk from the start. Salisbury Crags are immediately visible from the start. From here, walkers take the trail to the left, which soon forks; the main path continues to the left as an earthen singletrack trail with a steady, gradual climb. The lower sections can be very muddy and wet.

The path passes close to the ruins of St Anthony's Chapel, perched on a rocky spur below Whinny Hill. This is the only building within Holyrood Park and is believed to have fallen into disrepair after the Reformation of 1560. Beyond the chapel, the trail becomes steeper and rockier, with some slippery sections when wet. A metal chain railing assists climbers as they approach the summit.

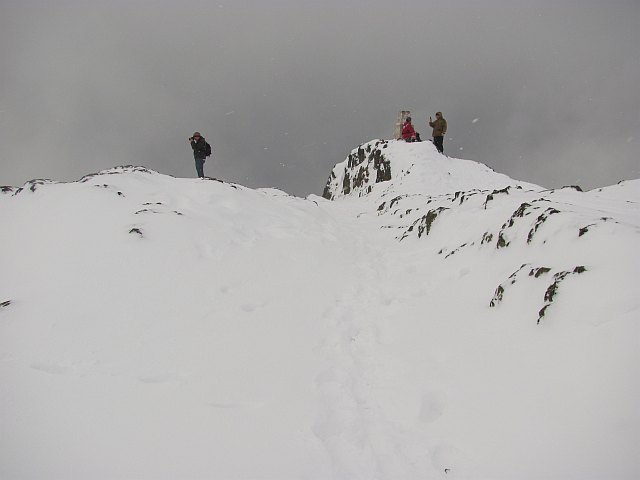
Arthur's Seat summit

The Arthur's Seat summit, at 251 metres, is often exposed to strong winds. From the top, there are panoramic views over Edinburgh, the Firth of Forth to the north, and the Bass Rock to the east. The remains of two volcanic vents, the Lion's Head and the Lion's Haunch, are visible on the summit.

The descent retraces the steep section to a path intersection, continuing past Whinny Hill along a gently climbing grassy route west of the hill, offering views of the Firth of Forth and walking through gorse bushes. The path then veers right, descending towards St Margaret's Loch on the left, before returning to Queen's Drive and back to the starting point near Holyrood Palace.

Terrain: Earth and rock, grassy slopes, muddy lower sections

Views: Panoramic city and sea views, volcanic features

Hazards: Slippery rocks when wet, exposed summit often windy

== Salisbury Crags circular trail ==
Length	Duration	Difficulty	Elevation gain	Route type
3.4 km	1-1.5 hour	moderate	156 m	loop

The Salisbury Crags circular trail is a loop trail starting near Holyrood Palace that provides scenic views of Edinburgh's historic centre with less effort than the full ascent to Arthur's Seat. The route begins on a surfaced path before joining rougher trails leading to Salisbury Crags, winding along the cliff edge. Walkers then descend to The Hawse and return to the start via grassy paths below the cliffs.

The terrain varies between paved sections, grassy paths, and rough, rocky ground. In wet conditions, the rougher sections can become muddy and slippery, and in icy weather, they may be slick. Appropriate footwear and warm layers are recommended, particularly in windy conditions.

The trailhead includes a pay-and-display car park, which can become very busy in good weather. The route offers panoramic views over the city, following the line of the cliffs and incorporating part of the Radical Road, before descending via the lower loop near St Margaret's Loch.

Terrain: Paved, grassy, and rocky sections

Views: Panoramic city and cliff-edge views

Hazards: Muddy or slippery ground in wet or icy conditions

== Radical road ==
Length	Difficulty	Status
1.5 km	Moderate-challenging	Closed

The Radical Road is a historic and scenic path that winds along the cliffs of Salisbury Crags in Holyrood Park, Edinburgh. The route offers panoramic views over the city, including the Scottish Parliament, the Palace of Holyroodhouse, and the surrounding landscape, and has been celebrated in literature and art for centuries. The path was originally constructed in the aftermath of the Radical War of 1820, when unemployed weavers from the west of Scotland were put to work paving the track, a plan suggested by Sir Walter Scott.

The path also holds geological significance: near Hutton's Section, the geologist James Hutton, considered the father of modern geology, made observations that contributed to his theory of the Earth's age and formation.

The Radical Road has been closed since 2018 following a 50-tonne rockfall. Previous closures due to rockfalls have occurred throughout the 20th and 21st centuries, including a 100-tonne fall in 2011. Engineering assessments indicate that sections of the path, present a high risk of rockfall, with potential fatality in extreme cases.

Historic Environment Scotland (HES), responsible for the park, has undertaken inspections, rock trajectory modelling, ecological surveys, and conservation work across the park, with plans to partially reopen sections of the Radical Road in early 2026, coinciding with the 300th anniversary of James Hutton's birth. Until reopening, access is only possible via pre-booked ranger-led tours.

Holyrood Park receives an estimated two million visits annually, placing significant pressure on maintenance and management resources.

== Walking routes by colors ==
Holyrood Park offers several marked walking routes, each distinguished by color to help visitors choose according to difficulty and interest:

- Red Route: A moderate trail following an ancient lava flow up to Arthur's Seat, offering views over Dunsapie Loch and the surrounding landscape.
- Blue Route: Passes through Hunter's Bog and ascends gently along Arthur's Seat, joining the Red Route at the end of Salisbury Crags.
- Green Route: A shorter, easier route to the summit, crossing grassy slopes and ancient agricultural terraces.
- Purple Route: A direct and steeper ascent from Holyrood Park Road, for more adventurous walkers.

== Visitor pressure and footpath erosion ==
Holyrood Park faces growing pressure from unprecedented visitor numbers, driven both by Edinburgh’s status as a major tourist hub and by the city’s recent rise in international accessibility. Although no precise counts exist, anecdotal estimates suggest that annual visits could reach several million, a figure visible in the heavy use of the main paths such as the Arthur’s Seat summit route and the trails along Salisbury Crags. The increasing footfall produces severe soil compaction: heavily trodden surfaces lose their natural drainage capacity, becoming saturated after rainfall and turning to mud. As walkers begin to avoid wet or churned-up sections, adjacent ground is pressed into service, widening the established footpaths and creating new informal desire lines. This is especially evident on the steeper gradients of Arthur’s Seat, on the grassy slopes surrounding Whinny Hill, and along the base of Salisbury Crags, where the volcanic soils are particularly prone to erosion. The cumulative effect is the gradual degradation of the terrain and the loss of the park’s characteristic wild aesthetic.

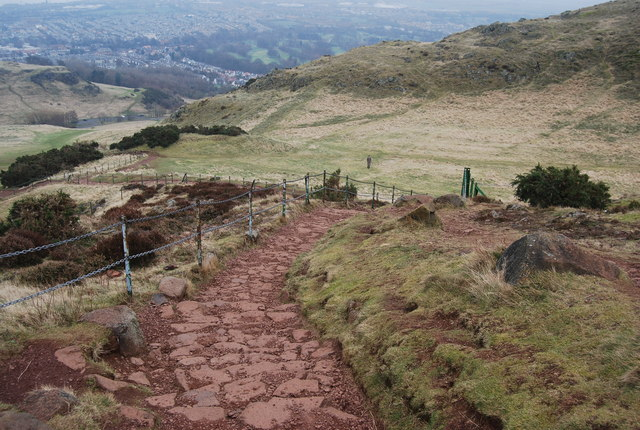

=== Climate change, weather intensification and landscape fragility ===
Climate change acts as an accelerating force on all existing pressures. Recent data shows a 21% increase in rainfall across Scotland, indicating a shift toward more frequent and more intense wet-weather events. In Holyrood Park, where slopes are steep and rock types include friable volcanic deposits, these conditions have produced a “perfect storm” of erosion risk. Once the soil has been compacted by visitors, even moderate rainfall can generate surface run-off that strips away remaining topsoil. Over time, these processes expose bedrock, destabilise walking routes and increase the likelihood of slips on wet or icy days—issues already often noted along the summit approaches, at the Radical Road, and on grassy sections near St Margaret’s Loch. The interaction between human impact and climate-driven saturation means that path degradation now occurs more quickly than maintenance works can be scheduled. This dynamic is particularly visible on informal shortcuts and unmaintained segments branching from the main coloured routes, where repeated footfall continues to push walkers into increasingly vulnerable areas.

=== Archaeological vulnerability ===
Despite its dramatic appearance, much of Holyrood Park’s archaeological landscape is subtle, poorly understood, and highly vulnerable. Many features—such as ancient cultivation terraces, hillfort traces, earth and stone banks, and areas with potential buried deposits—are not readily recognised by casual visitors. This lack of public awareness heightens the risk of accidental damage, as walkers, runners and dog-walkers unknowingly cross sensitive zones, contributing to erosion that may remove archaeological layers entirely. The challenge is compounded by the scale of the park and the limited staff resources available. While the Ranger Service provides guided walks, educational outreach and interpretive material, it is infeasible to have staff present throughout the park to communicate the significance of these features. Management strategies therefore rely heavily on maintaining the core footpath network—such as the Red, Blue and Purple routes—and encouraging visitors to remain on these designated paths. Specialist contractors carry out phased repairs using geologically matched materials, but the absence of a broader strategic plan means that issues away from the maintained routes continue to escalate. Looking forward, the park requires a holistic management plan that balances public access, environmental protection, and archaeological conservation. Climate pressures, budget constraints, and the sheer diversity of user groups make this a complex task. Nonetheless, recent initiatives—such as the new information hub, updated signage, and efforts to engage local stakeholders—indicate a growing recognition that stewardship must be shared between managers, residents, and visitors. Campaigns promoting responsible use, together with better interpretation and awareness-raising, are viewed as essential steps to mitigate the ongoing erosion of Holyrood Park’s natural and cultural heritage.

== Natural Environment and Biodiversity ==
The heavy number of visitors at Holyrood Park has marked consequences for its flora and fauna. Repeated trampling along popular footpaths causes soil compaction, which reduces water infiltration and aeration. This affects seedling growth and root systems, undermining plant diversity and favoring hardy, disturbance‑tolerant species over more fragile native flora.

Hardened and eroded soil also damages the environment. It leads to unstable slopes, less ground cover, and the loss of the small, specialized niches that rare plants and insects need to survive on rock faces and lake shores.

Growing numbers of tourists, along with the noise and trail damage they bring, are destroying critical habitats. This is pushing out sensitive species like ground-nesting birds and insects, and causing a decline in animals that need undisturbed vegetation to survive.

=== Flora ===
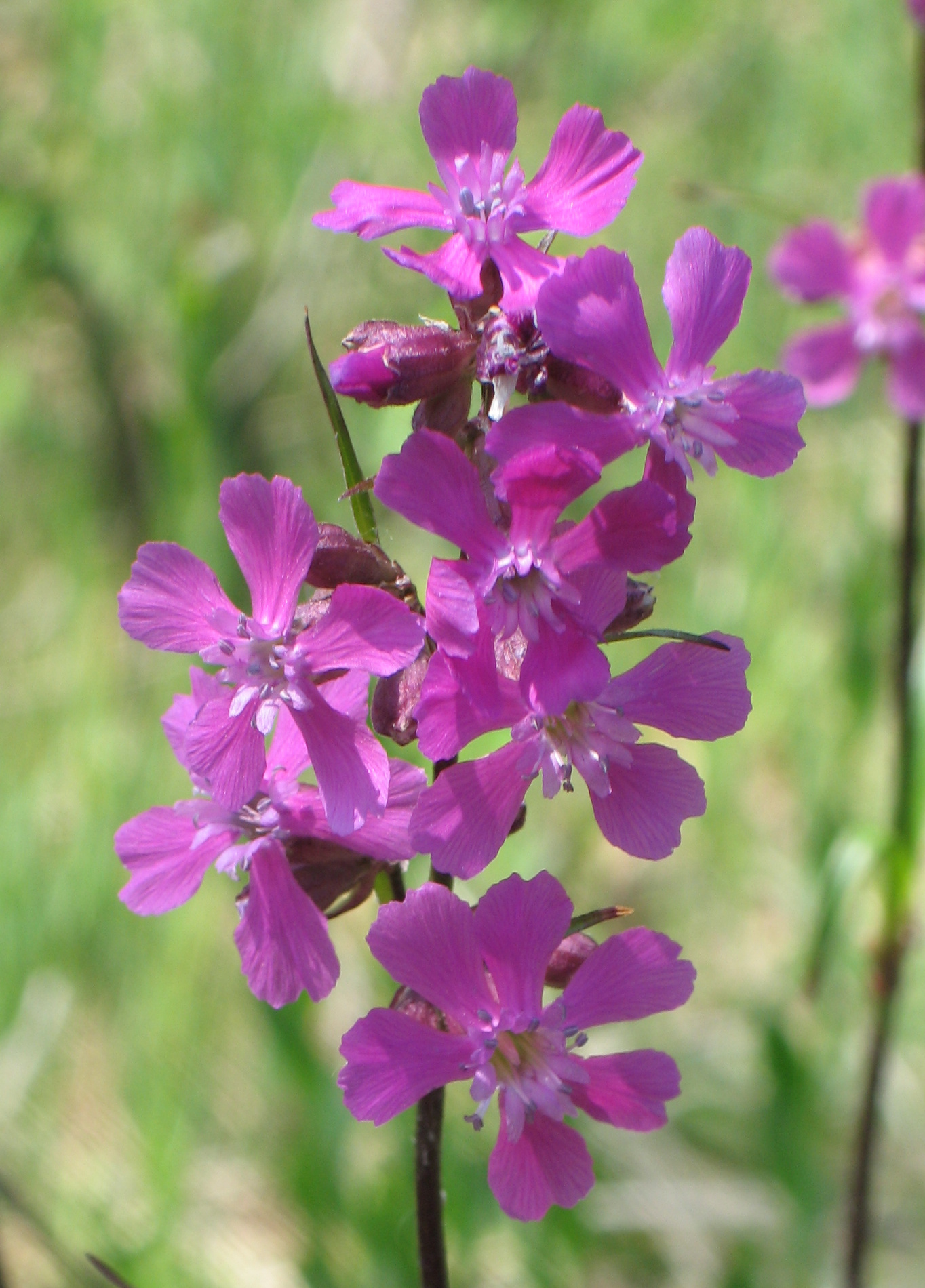
Silene vicaria

Holyrood Park contains a remarkably rich botanical environment thanks to its volcanic geology and variety of habitats, including rocky slopes, grasslands, wetlands around the lochs, and open hillsides. More than 350 species of vascular plants have been recorded in the park, including several that are rare in Scotland. Among the most notable is the sticky catchfly (Silene viscaria), which grows on rocky outcrops. Its population had sharply declined in the late 20th century, but conservation programmes led by the Royal Botanic Garden Edinburgh have successfully reintroduced it to Arthur’s Seat.

=== Fauna ===
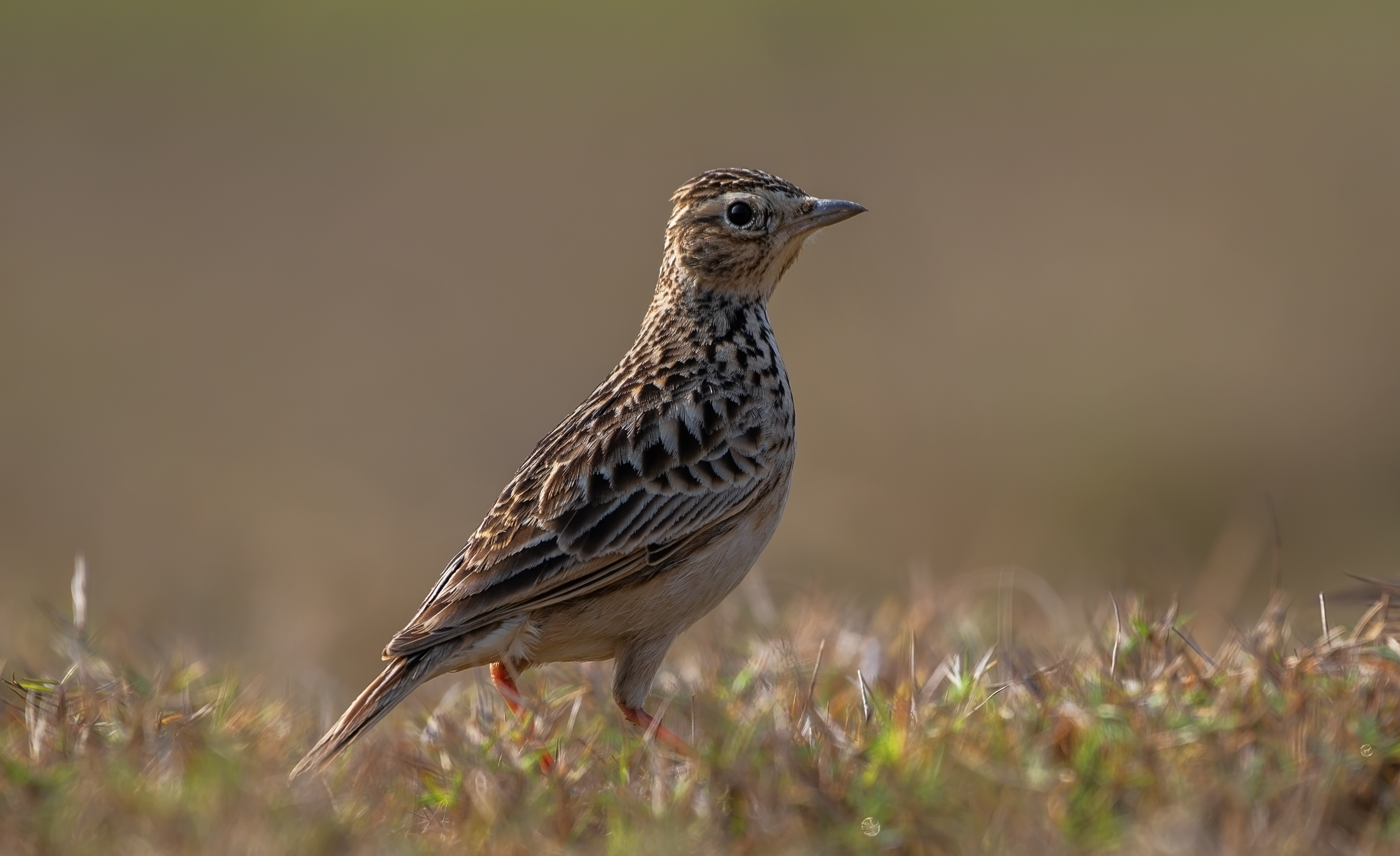
Skylark (aluada)

The cliffs of Salisbury Crags (the “smaller sibling” of Arthur’s Seat—a steep cliff edge forming part of its volcanic ridge) support a breeding colony of fulmar, a seabird usually associated with coastal environments, making it an unusual presence within a major city. The park’s grasslands provide habitat for species such as meadow pipit and skylark, both considered conservation priorities in the UK. Wetland areas, including Duddingston Loch and St Margaret’s Loch, attract wintering waterfowl, swans and ducks, especially during migration periods. Additionally, the park’s rocky habitats and gorse-covered slopes support vulnerable invertebrates. For example, gorse fires recorded near Salisbury Crags have threatened populations of rare moth species, illustrating the fragility of these ecosystems.

== Balancing recreation and conservation ==
Arthur's Seat and Holyrood Park are subject to an ongoing management challenge arising from the tension between public access and environmental conservation. The park's trails, cliffs, and grasslands are not only geologically and historically significant but also support rare flora and fauna that are highly vulnerable to human disturbance.

The combination of tourist pressure and fragility of the terrain poses a significant threat to Holyrood Park’s biodiversity. Many rare plants grow on thin soils or in narrow rock fissures; repeated trampling and the creation of informal desire lines can destroy these sensitive microhabitats.. High visitor numbers, particularly concentrated along the main footpaths and scenic viewpoints, lead to erosion and habitat fragmentation, directly threatening these fragile ecosystems. Managing the park requires balancing public access, geological conservation, and environmental protection. Even when restoration or reintroduction projects are carried out, such as the recovery of sticky catchfly, visitor numbers remain a major challenge.

Management strategies, such as maintaining formal trails and offering guided tours, aim to mitigate this damage. However, these measures primarily address the symptoms rather than the underlying conflict between unrestricted access and ecological preservation. In the absence of more comprehensive visitor education and regulated access to sensitive zones, human activity continues to displace vulnerable species and degrade microhabitats. Furthermore, events such as gorse fires, heavy rainfall, and erosion intensified by climate change compound these pressures, further threatening habitats and the survival of vulnerable species.

This situation reflects a broader conservation paradox: while public engagement with natural heritage can foster environmental awareness and cultural appreciation, excessive or unmanaged use can undermine the very values the park is intended to protect. Effective management, therefore, requires a strategic balance that integrates infrastructure planning, ecological monitoring, and community engagement. This approach is necessary to ensure that recreational use does not compromise long-term biodiversity or the park's unique geological and cultural features.
