= Bever =

Bever may refer to:

- Bever, Belgium, a municipality located in the Belgian province of Flemish Brabant
- Strombeek-Bever, part of the Belgian municipality of Grimbergen
- Bever, Switzerland, a municipality in the district of Maloja of the Canton of Graubünden, Switzerland
  - Bever railway station, a Rhaetian Railway station
- Bever (Ems), a tributary to the river Ems, North Rhine-Westphalia, Germany
- Bever (Oste), a tributary to the river Oste, Lower Saxony, Germany
- Bever (Weser), a tributary to the river Weser, North Rhine-Westphalia, Germany
- Bever (Wupper), a tributary to the river Wupper, North Rhine-Westphalia, Germany

== People with the surname ==
- Adolphe van Bever (1871–1927), French bibliographer
- Georges Bever (1884–1973), French actor
- James Bever, American biologist
- Paddy Bever (born 2002), English actor
- Steve Bever, American baseball coach
- Thomas Bever (born 1939), American psychologist
- Robert and Michael Bever, American murderers
