= De Bever =

De Bever, DeBever, or Debever is a Dutch-language surname meaning "from Bever". People with the name include:

- Bas de Bever (born 1968), Dutch former professional Motocross (BMX) racer
- Emmanuelle Debever (1963 – 2023), a French actress
- Julie Debever (born 1988), a French football player
- Leo de Bever (1930 – 2015), Dutch architect
- McKenna DeBever (born 1996), American-Peruvian swimmer
