= Phytogeography =

Study of geographic distribution of plant species

Phytogeography (from Greek φυτόν, phytón 'plant' and γεωγραφία, geographía 'geography' meaning also distribution) or botanical geography is the branch of biogeography that is concerned with the geographic distribution of plant species and their influence on the earth's surface. Phytogeography is concerned with all aspects of plant distribution, from the controls on the distribution of individual species ranges (at both large and small scales, see species distribution) to the factors that govern the composition of entire communities and floras. Geobotany, by contrast, focuses on the geographic space's influence on plants.

== Fields ==
Phytogeography is part of a more general science known as biogeography. Phytogeographers are concerned with patterns and process in plant distribution. Most of the major questions and kinds of approaches taken to answer such questions are held in common between phyto- and zoogeographers.

Phytogeography in wider sense (or geobotany, in German literature) encompasses four fields, according with the focused aspect, environment, flora (taxa), vegetation (plant community) and origin, respectively:

- plant ecology (or mesology – however, the physiognomic-ecological approach on vegetation and biome study are also generally associated with this field);
- plant geography (or phytogeography in strict sense, chorology, floristics);
- plant sociology (or phytosociology, synecology – however, this field does not prescind from flora study, as its approach to study vegetation relies upon a fundamental unit, the plant association, which is defined upon flora).
- historical plant geography (or paleobotany, paleogeobotany)

Phytogeography is often divided into two main branches: ecological phytogeography and historical phytogeography. The former investigates the role of current day biotic and abiotic interactions in influencing plant distributions; the latter are concerned with historical reconstruction of the origin, dispersal, and extinction of taxa.

== Overview ==
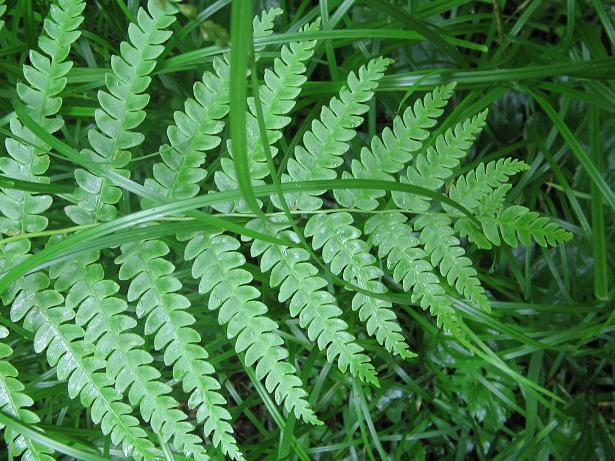
The basic data element of phytogeography are specimen records. These are collected individual plants like this one, a cinnamon fern, collected in the Great Smoky Mountains of North Carolina.

The basic data elements of phytogeography are occurrence records (presence or absence of a species) with operational geographic units such as political units or geographical coordinates. These data are often used to construct phytogeographic provinces (floristic provinces) and elements.

The questions and approaches in phytogeography are largely shared with zoogeography, except zoogeography is concerned with animal distribution rather than plant distribution. The term phytogeography itself suggests a broad meaning. How the term is actually applied by practicing scientists is apparent in the way periodicals use the term. The American Journal of Botany, a monthly primary research journal, frequently publishes a section titled "Systematics, Phytogeography, and Evolution." Topics covered in the American Journal of Botany's "Systematics and Phytogeography" section include phylogeography, distribution of genetic variation and, historical biogeography, and general plant species distribution patterns. Biodiversity patterns are not heavily covered. A flora is the group of all plant species in a specific period of time or area, in which each species is independent in abundance and relationships to the other species. The group or the flora can be assembled in accordance with floral element, which are based on common features. A flora element can be a genetic element, in which the group of species share similar genetic information i.e. common evolutionary origin; a migration element has a common route of access into a habitat; a historical element is similar to each other in certain past events and an ecological element is grouped based on similar environmental factors. A population is the collection of all interacting individuals of a given species, in an area.

An area is the entire location where a species, an element or an entire flora can occur. Aerography studies the description of that area, chorology studies their development. The local distribution within the area as a whole, as that of a swamp shrub, is the topography of that area. Areas are an important factor is forming an image about how species interaction result in their geography. The nature of an area’s margin, their continuity, their general shape and size relative to other areas, make the study of area crucial in identifying these types of information. For example, a relict area is an area surviving from an earlier and more exclusive occurrence. Mutually exclusive plants are called vicarious (areas containing such plants are also called vicarious). The earth’s surface is divided into floristic region, each region associated with a distinctive flora.

== History ==
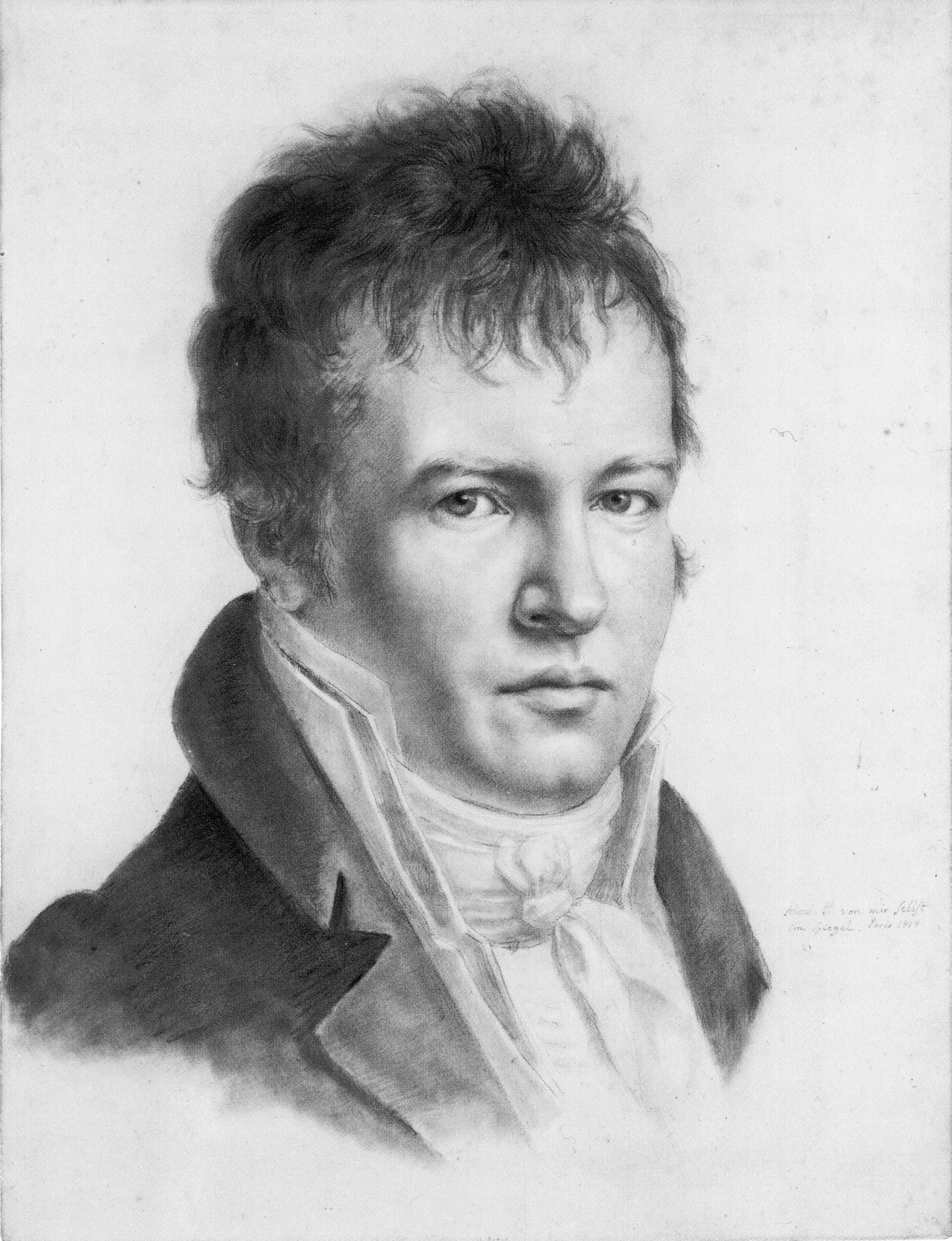
An 1814 self-portrait in Paris of Alexander von Humboldt. Humboldt is often referred to as the "father of phytogeography".

Phytogeography has a long history. One of the subjects earliest proponents was Prussian naturalist Alexander von Humboldt, who is often referred to as the "father of phytogeography". Von Humboldt advocated a quantitative approach to phytogeography that has characterized modern plant geography.

Gross patterns of the distribution of plants became apparent early on in the study of plant geography. For example, Alfred Russel Wallace, co-discoverer of the principle of natural selection, discussed the latitudinal gradients in species diversity, a pattern observed in other organisms as well. Much research effort in plant geography has since then been devoted to understanding this pattern and describing it in more detail.

In 1890, the United States Congress passed an act that appropriated funds to send expeditions to discover the geographic distributions of plants (and animals) in the United States. The first of these was The Death Valley Expedition, including Frederick Vernon Coville, Frederick Funston, Clinton Hart Merriam, and others.

Research in plant geography has also been directed to understanding the patterns of adaptation of species to the environment. This is done chiefly by describing geographical patterns of trait/environment relationships. These patterns termed ecogeographical rules when applied to plants represent another area of phytogeography.

== Floristic regions ==
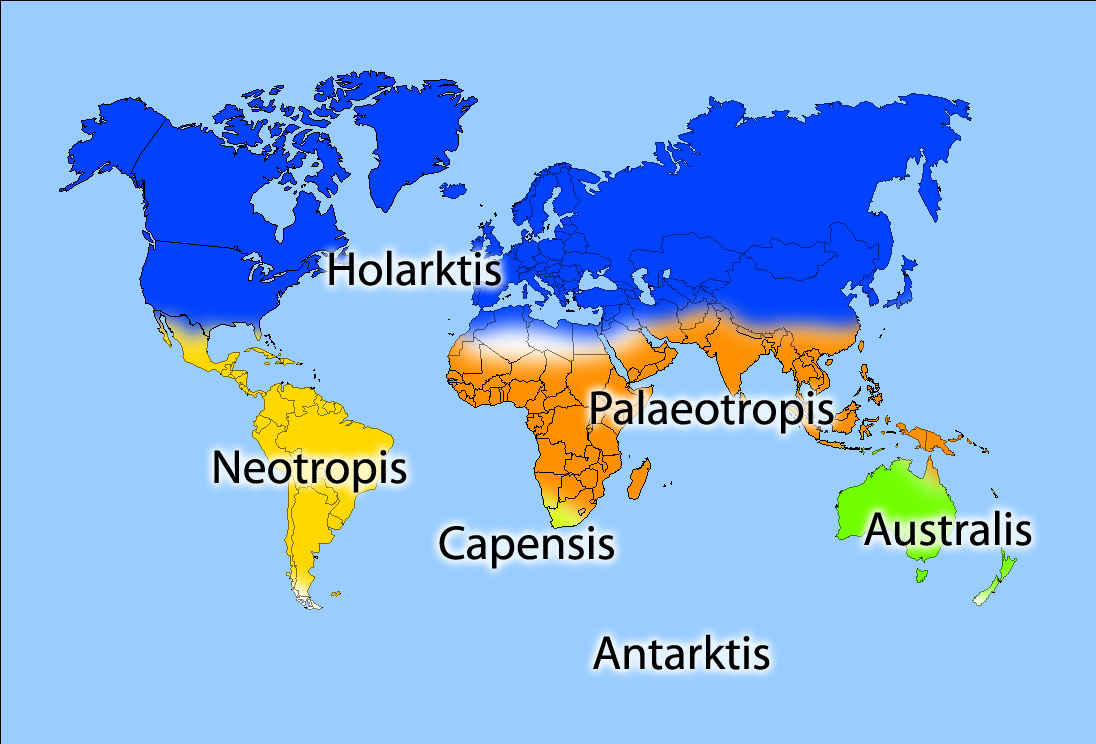
Good (1947) floristic kingdoms

Floristics is a study of the flora of some territory or area. Traditional phytogeography concerns itself largely with floristics and floristic classification.

China has been a focus to botanists for its rich biota as it holds the record for the earliest known angiosperm megafossil.

== See also ==
- Biogeography
- Botany
- Floristics
- Geobotanical prospecting
- indicator value
- Species distribution
- Zoogeography
- Association (ecology)

== Bibliography ==
- Brown, James H.; Lomolino, Mark V. (1998) [1983]. "Chapter 1". Biogeography (Second ed.). Sunderland, Massachusetts: Sinauer Associates. ISBN 0878930736.
- Humbodlt, Alexander von; Bonpland, Aimé (1805). Essai sur la geographie des plantes. Accompagné d'un tableau physique des régions équinoxiales fondé sur des mesures exécutées, depuis le dixiéme degré de latitude boréale jusqu'au dixiéme degré de latitude australe, pendant les années 1799, 1800, 1801, 1802 et 1803 (in French). Paris: Schöll.
- Polunin, Nicholas (1960). Introduction to Plant Geography and Some Related Sciences. McGraw-Hill.
- Wallace, Alfred R. (1878). Tropical Nature, and Other Essays. London: Macmillan.
