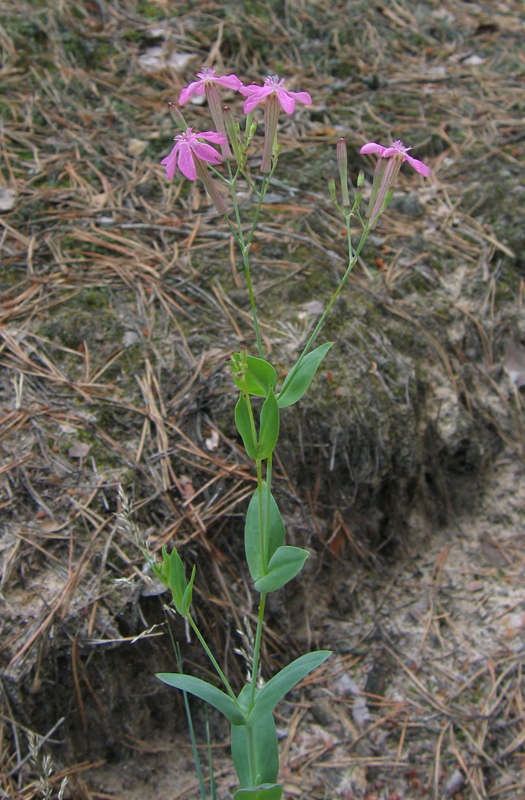
- Sweet William catchfly

Scientific classification
- Kingdom: Plantae
- Clade: Tracheophytes
- Clade: Angiosperms
- Clade: Eudicots
- Order: Caryophyllales
- Family: Caryophyllaceae
- Genus: Atocion
- Species: A. armeria

Binomial name
- Atocion armeria (L.) Raf.

Synonyms
- List: Cucubalus fasciculatus Lam.; Lychnis armoraria Scop.; Silene armeria L.; Silene glauca Salisb.; Silene latifolia Gray; Silene variegata Fenzl; Atocion armeria var. lituanicum (Zapał.) Niketić & Stevan.; Atocion armeria var. sparsiflorum (Schur) Niketić & Stevan.; Atocion armeroides Raf.; Atocion lituanicum (Zapał.) Tzvelev; Cucubalus glaucus Spreng.; Silene armeria f. albiflora Matevski & Kostad.; Silene armeria var. angustifolia Rchb. ex Zapał.; Silene armeria var. berdaui (Zapał.) Kulcz.; Silene armeria f. minor Bolzon; Silene armeria f. ramosissima Bolzon; Silene armeria var. serpentini Beck; Silene armeria var. sparsiflora Schur; Silene berdaui Zapał.; Silene lituanica Zapał.; Silene mixta Fenzl; Silene subleopoliensis Zapał.; Silene umbellata Gilib.

= Atocion armeria =

Species of flowering plant

Atocion armeria, commonly known as Sweet William catchfly, is a species of plant in the family Caryophyllaceae. Originally a native of Europe, it has become widespread in the United States. A small-growing form is known as a dwarf catchfly. The name comes from the way in which small insects are trapped by the sticky sap exuded onto the stem. Although it has been identified as a carnivorous plant in the past, it is not currently regarded as such.

== Description ==
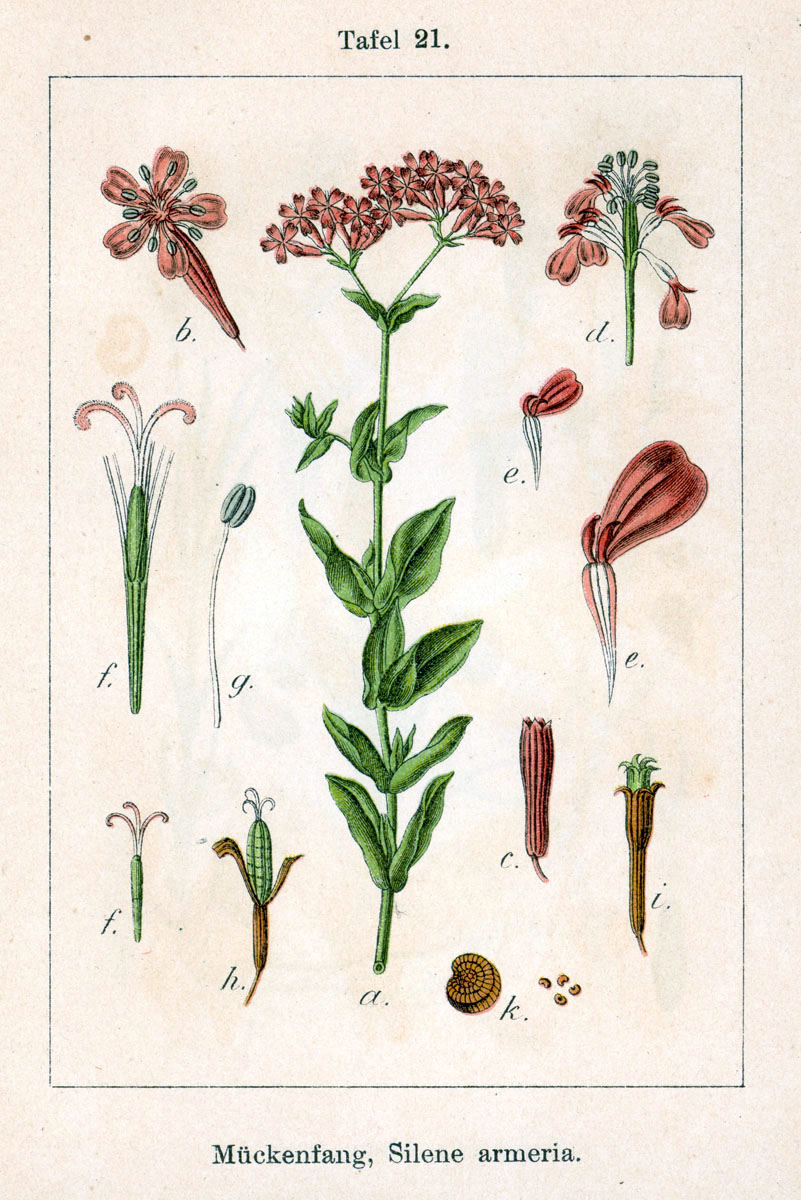
Figure from book Deutschlands Flora in Abbildungen

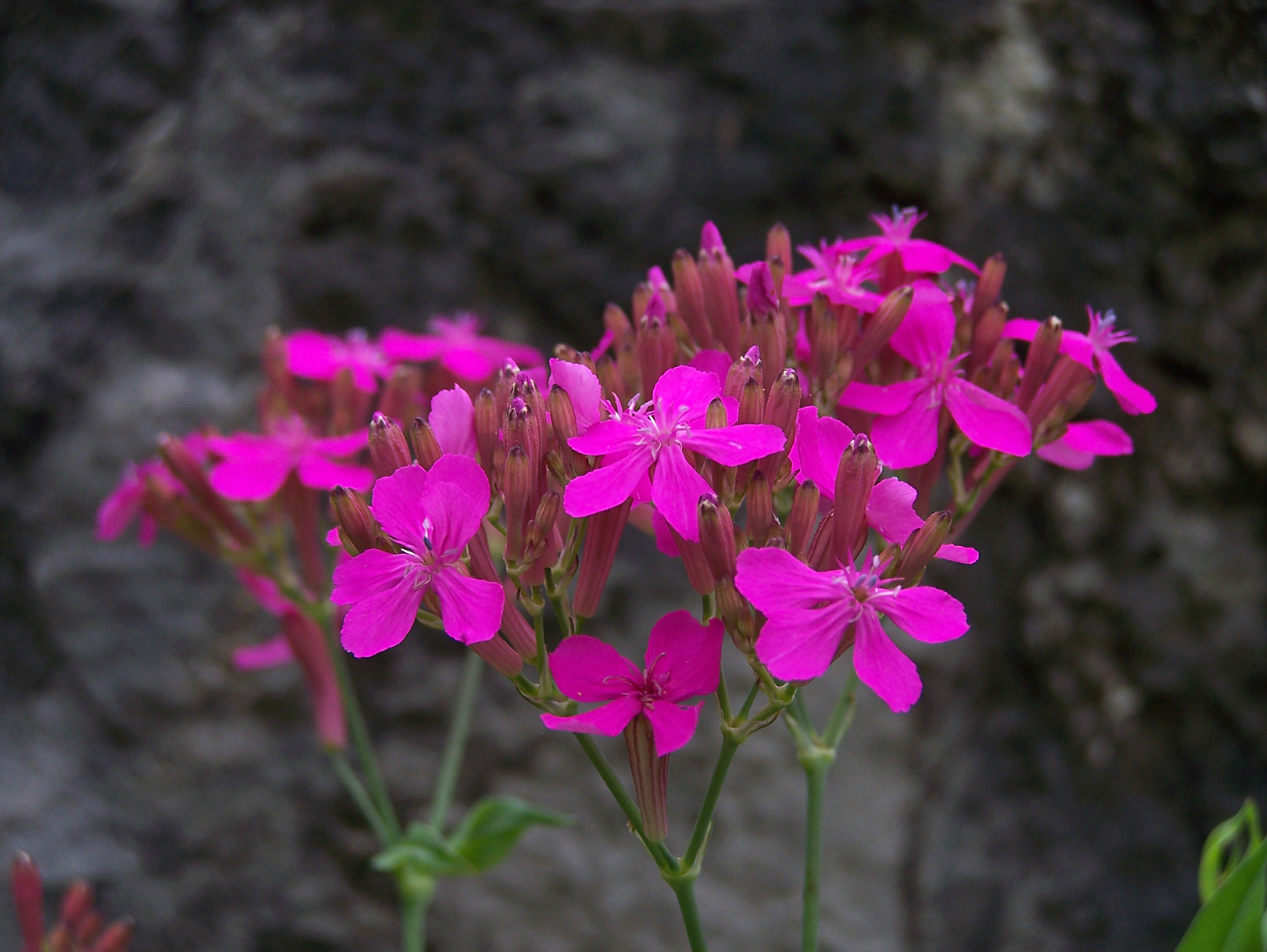
Bracteate inflorescence

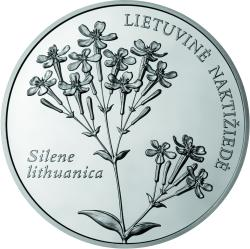
The Lithuanian former 50 litas silver coin featuring Sweet William catchfly

The plant is between 20 and 70 centimetres (8 and 27 1/2 inches) in height. Leaves are numerous, ranging from 2.5–5 cm (1–2 in) long, elliptic, oval, or narrowly oval, smooth. The blooming period in British Isles is from June to October. Clusters of pink or lavender flowers arranged somewhat openly or compactly at the end of stems. Stem hairless (glabrous) or slightly hairy with sticky areas, especially just below the cluster.

== Distribution and habitat ==
A plant native of Europe in roadsides, weedy places. Has been introduced to North America and later escaped cultivation to become an invasive species.

Perennial in USDA plant hardiness zones 5 to 8.
