= Geobotanical prospecting =

Method of identifying mineral deposits

Geobotanical prospecting is prospecting based on the composition and health of surrounding botanical life to identify potential resource deposits. Using a variety of techniques, including indicator plant identification, remote sensing and determining the physical and chemical condition of the botanical life in the area, geobotanical prospecting can be used to discover different minerals. This process has clear advantages and benefits, such as being relatively non-invasive and cost efficient. However, the efficacy of this method is not without question. There is evidence that this form of prospecting is a valid scientific method, especially when used in conjunction with other prospecting methods. But as identification of commercial mines are invariably guided by geological principles and confirmed by chemical assays, it is unclear as to whether this prospecting method is a valid standalone scientific method or an outdated method of the past.

== Underlying principle ==
There is a complex interaction between soil and plants. The nutrient and mineral composition of the soil heavily influences both the type and physical condition of botanical life it can support. Using this principle, in certain cases, it is theoretically possible to determine the mineral content of the underlying soils and rocks (i.e., mineral deposits) using the overlying botanical life.

== History ==
In 2015, Stephen E. Haggerty identified Pandanus candelabrum as a botanical indicator for kimberlite pipes, a source of mined diamonds.

The technique has been used in China since in the 5th century BC. People in the region noticed a connection between vegetation and the minerals located underground. There were particular plants that throve on and indicated areas rich in copper, nickel, zinc, and allegedly gold though the latter has not been confirmed. The connection arose out of an agricultural interest concerning soil compositions. While the process had been known to the Chinese region since antiquity, it was not written about and studied in the west until the 18th century in Italy.

== Methods ==
Geobotanical prospecting can be done through a variety of different methods. Any method that uses the overlying botanical life (in any way) as an indication of the underlying mineral composition can be considered geobotanical prospecting. These methods can include indicator plant identification, remote sensing, and determining the physical and chemical condition of the botanical life through laboratory techniques.

=== Indicator plants ===
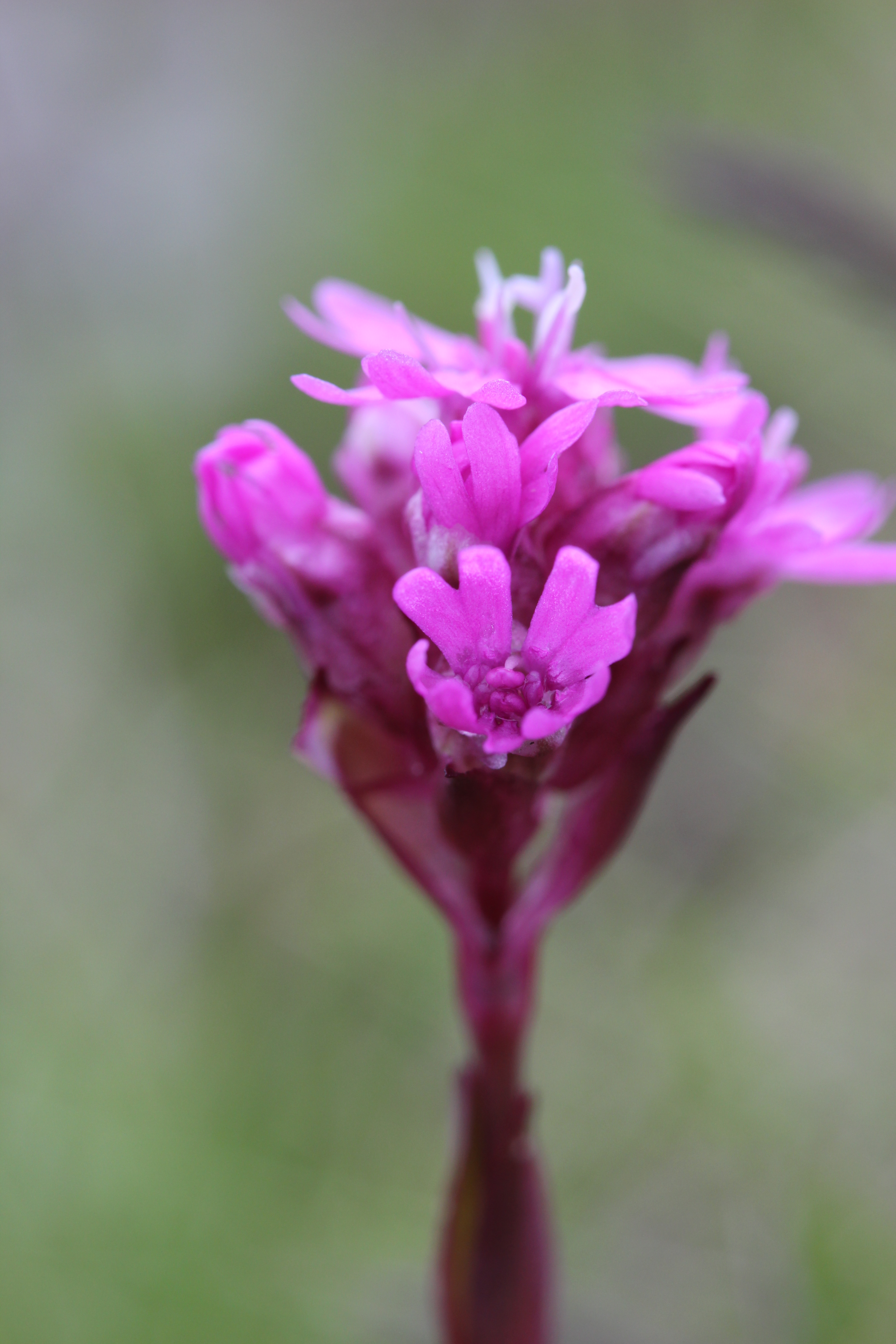
Silene suecica. Indicator plant that was used by prospectors to discover ore deposits.

Indicator plant identification is determining the presence and distribution of certain indicator plants. Certain plants prefer certain concentrations of minerals in the soil and would thus be more plentiful in areas with higher concentrations of their preferred mineral. By mapping the distribution of indicator plants, it is possible to get an overview of the geology of the area.

For example, the Viscaria Mine in Sweden was named after the plant Silene suecica (syn. Viscaria alpina) that was used by prospectors to discover the ore deposits.

=== Remote sensing techniques ===
==== Aerial photography ====
Aerial photography is simply taking photographs of the ground from a higher elevation. Using aerial photography it is possible to survey a large area of land relatively quickly at relatively low cost to get an overview of the plant diversity of an area. This can lead to the mapping of underlying mineral deposits.

For example, using aerial photography, it is possible to determine the existence of premature leaf senescence (premature aging of cells). In some cases, this can lead to the detection of increased copper concentrations in the soil, leading to the discovery of copper deposits.

==== Satellite imagery ====
Satellite imagery can be used to capture large amounts of data in a large area. This data, when analyzed correctly, can be used to aid in the geobotanical prospecting process. Satellite imagery can be used to determine concentrations of certain minerals and elements in certain plants. For example, satellite imagery has been used to determine potassium concentrations in tea plants. Satellite imagery has also been used to monitor invasive plant movement. Using satellite imagery, it is possible to get a detailed image of the overlying botanical life. Using the overlying botanical life it is possible to get a overview of the underlying geological composition.

=== Biochemical indicators ===
As plants uptake minerals from their surrounding soils, the minerals get deposited into their tissues. In a laboratory setting, plant tissues can be analyzed to determine the concentrations of these minerals. Once the concentrations of these minerals are known, it is possible to determine the concentrations of minerals in these plants soils and thus the underlying geology of the area. This method is particularly useful for nanoparticles i.e., particles that are too low in concentration to detect in soils but get fixed in plant tissue. This is the case when prospecting for gold.

== Applications and examples ==
Using the botanical life in the area to determine the underlying geological composition has been used in a variety of ways and for a variety of minerals.

=== Copper (Cu) ===
Copper (Cu) is an essential micronutrient that plants absorb from the soil. Copper that is absorbed from the soil is used in various internal process such as photosynthesis, plant respiration and enzyme function. However, increased concentrations of copper can lead to copper toxicity or copper mineralization in the plant, causing specific physiological responses. This mineralization can then be detected through geobotanical surveys.

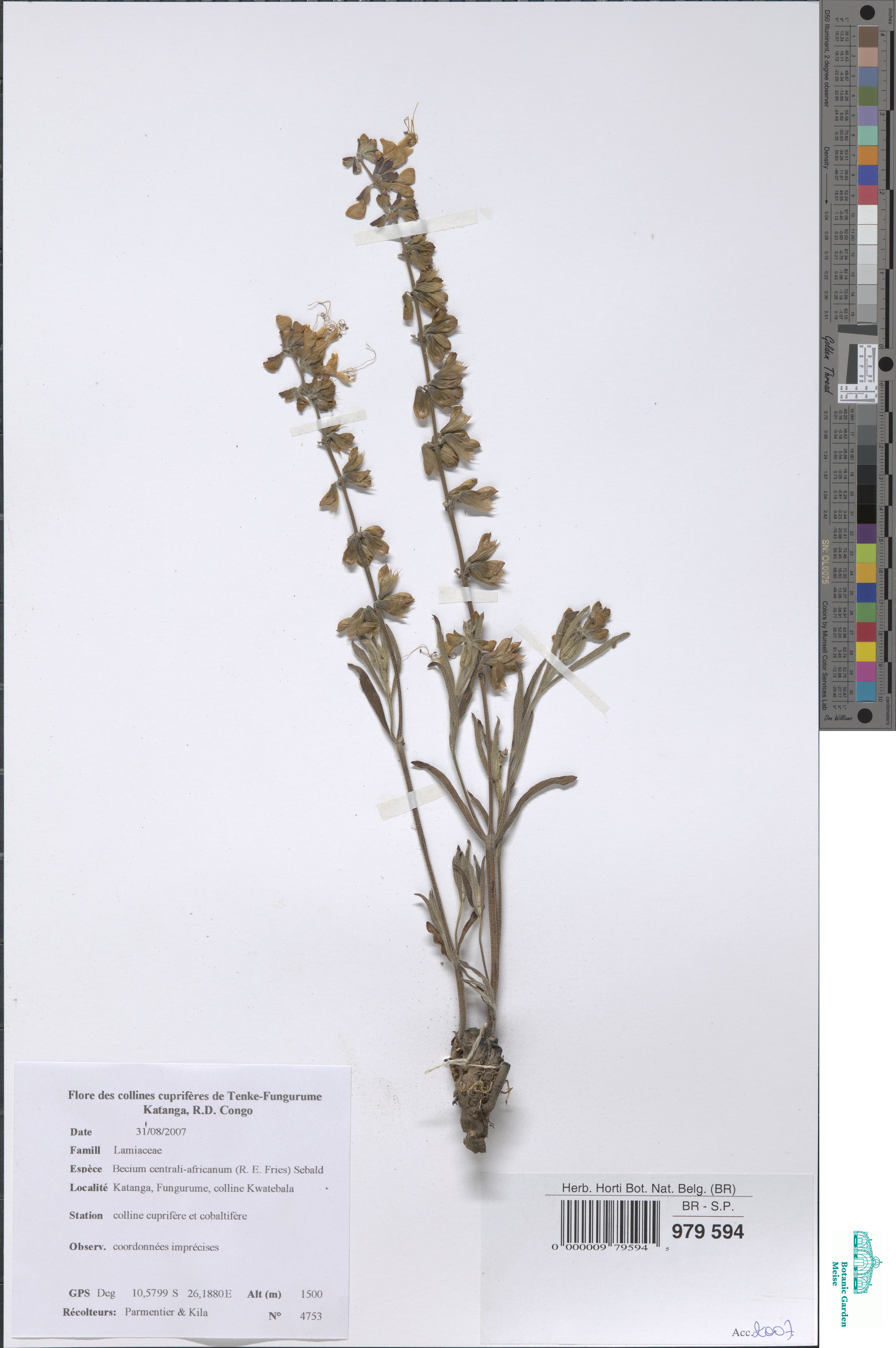
Ocimum centraliafricanum or "copper plant". A well known indicator plant for copper rich soils.

Geobotanical prospecting for copper generally takes the form of identifying indicator plants, i.e., metallophyte species. Metallophytes are plants that can tolerate high levels of heavy metals in the soils such as copper. These metallophyte species can show symptoms of copper toxicity that can be detected through geobotanical methods like remote sensing or field surveys. These symptoms of copper toxicity can include altered photosynthesis cycles, stunted growth, discoloration and inhibition of root growth.

Some popular examples of copper indicator plants include the Zambian copper flower Becium centraliafricanum, Haumaniastrum kutungense, and Ocimum centraliafricanum (syn. Becium homblei), a "most faithful" indicator plant, known as "copper plant" or "copper flower", found only on copper (and nickel) rich soils in central to southern Africa. Lichens (Lecanora cascadensis) have also been used to determine copper mineralization.

Geobotanical surveys for copper are most likely to consist of a variation of methods such as field observations and remote sensing (aerial photography and satellite imagery). After potential copper rich areas are discovered through the methods such as those listed above, further exploration techniques can be used to confirm the presence of mineral deposits. These exploration techniques can include soil sampling and geochemical analysis, geophysical surveys and drilling. Geobotanical prospecting is a useful first step in the prospecting process for copper deposits, and its full potential can be reached when used in conjunction with other prospecting methods.

=== Gold (Au) ===
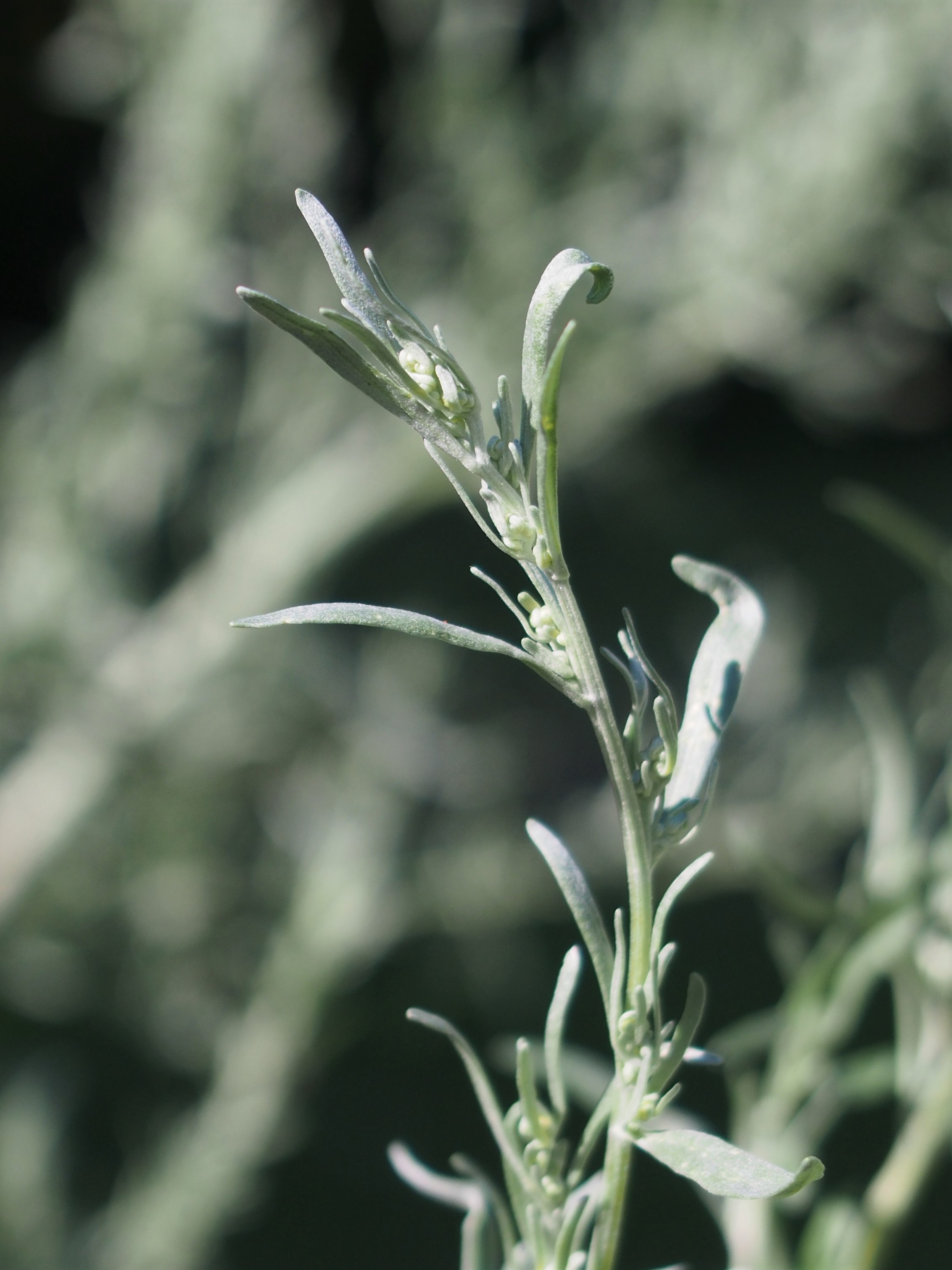
Artemisia absinthium. A type of wormwood plant belonging to the genus Artemisia. The genus of plants most commonly used in geobotanical prospecting for gold.

Prospecting for gold using geobotanical methods usually involves determining the gold content that has been absorbed by botanical life. However, because the gold content in soils and in the corresponding vegetation is usually very low (practically undetectable), direct measuring of gold is unlikely to be effective. To overcome this obstacle, detecting a suitable pathfinder mineral is the method usually employed. Pathfinder minerals (a mineral that almost always occurs in conjunction with another mineral) most commonly associated with gold is arsenic. As for which plants are most likely to contain elevated levels of gold, shrubs from the genus Artemisia (sagebrush or wormwood) are recommended.

Research has been ongoing for many years on the interaction between gold and vegetation. These new methods could increase the accuracy of gold detection in vegetation. However, presently because of the difficulties in identifying gold contained within vegetation, geobotanical prospecting for gold is most effective when combined with other prospecting methods like geophysical surveys.

=== Uranium (U) ===
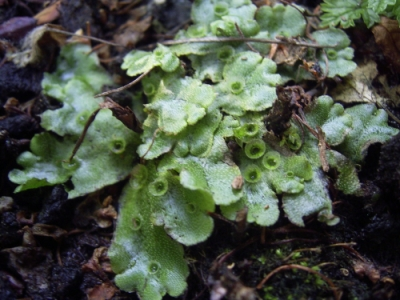
Marchantia polymorpha. A species of bryophyte (liverwort). An example of the type of plant used for geobotanical prospecting of uranium.

Uranium is not an essential nutrient to plants, but if uranium is present in the surrounding soils the element will be taken up into the plant system. Uranium is toxic to plants due to its radioactive nature. Plants that have accumulated a larger than normal amount of uranium, will show signs of uranium toxicity. Uranium toxicity results in various physiological processes of the plants being hindered. These hindered physiological processes include seed germination and photosynthesis. Because of these changes in physiology, uranium toxicity is relatively easy to detect in plants.

Plants that generally show increased uranium levels are bryophytes. Bryophytes include plants such as mosses and liverworts. Some other indicator plants include Aster venustas, and Astragalus albulus.

Geobotanical prospecting for uranium deposits usually consists of rigorous systematic sampling of vegetation as well as laboratory analysis to determine uranium content.

=== Other resources ===
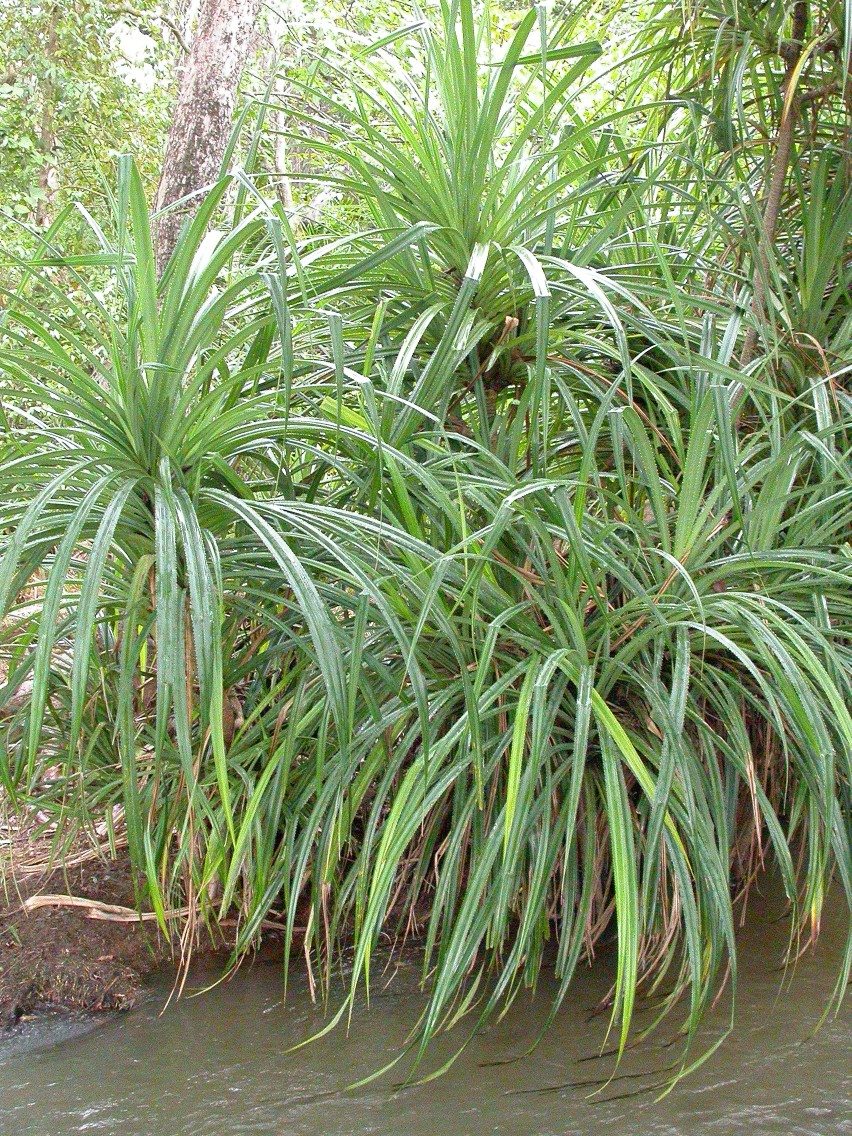
Pandanus candelabrum. Indicator plant used to locate Kimberlite pipes, an igneous rock formation often containing diamonds.

Geobotanical prospecting has also been used to discover a variety of other resources. One such resource is Kimberlite pipes, an igneous rock feature that often contains diamonds. The indicator plant, Pandanus candelabrum, was found to be biochemically distinct when growing on kimberlite pipes when compared to samples growing on country rock. This discovery makes it possible for future prospecting of kimberlite pipes and by association, diamonds, using geobotanical prospecting.

In some cases direct detection of the mineral of interest is not possible, and detection of pathfinder minerals is required. Such is the case with arsenic and gold, and in scandium and ultramafic regolith's (rich in cobalt and nickel). In cases such as these, the mineral concentration in the local flora is especially useful.

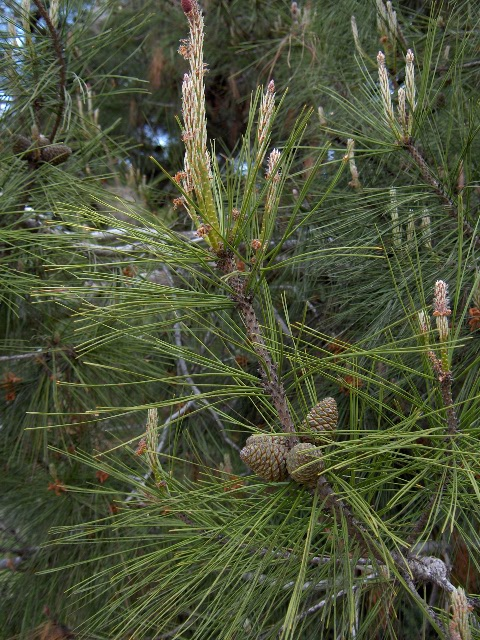
Pinus brutia. An indicator plant for iron and zinc.

Other minerals have also been discovered using indicator plants. Iron and zinc can be located with the indicator plant Pinus brutia. Chromite deposits can be located using the indicator plant Pteropyrum olivieri.

== Advantages and benefits ==
There are many advantages and benefits associated with geobotanical prospecting, making it a valuable addition to modern and traditional prospecting methods. It is a relatively cost effective method of prospecting when compared to traditional methods such as drilling. By taking advantage of the indications from local flora, it is possible to get an overview of the local geology. This overview can be accomplished with a significantly lower investment in manpower and expensive equipment that is needed for more traditional prospecting methods such as drilling. Geobotanical prospecting is a minimally invasive process, allowing for large scale initial prospecting with minimal environmental disruption. Making it a relatively environmentally sustainable prospecting method.

Along with its minimally invasive nature, geobotanical prospecting allows for time efficient large-scale prospecting. With continual advancements in remote sensing technologies such as aerial photography and satellite imaging, it is possible to get a detailed map of an area's botany in a relatively short amount of time. This large scale fast spatial coverage increases the likelihood of locating mineral deposits and resulting in successful prospecting efforts.

Another benefit of geobotanical prospecting is an educational one. Mapping the vegetation of an area and determining its underlying geology, allows researchers to increase their understanding of the earths geochemical processes, i.e., the interaction between minerals and living botany. By analyzing the distribution and concentration of various elements and minerals in botanical life, researcher's understanding of the mineralization process will increase. This rise in understanding will allow for a broader understanding of the interactions between inorganic substances, such as minerals, and organic life, such as plants.

Geobotanical prospecting can be applied to many minerals, including copper and uranium. This versatility is an advantage of geobotanical prospecting.

== Limitations and efficacy ==
Geobotanical prospecting is not without limitations. The success of geobotanical prospecting methods depends on many factors including, local plant species diversity, soil composition and climate conditions. All these factors can obscure key results or cause a misinterpretation of findings.

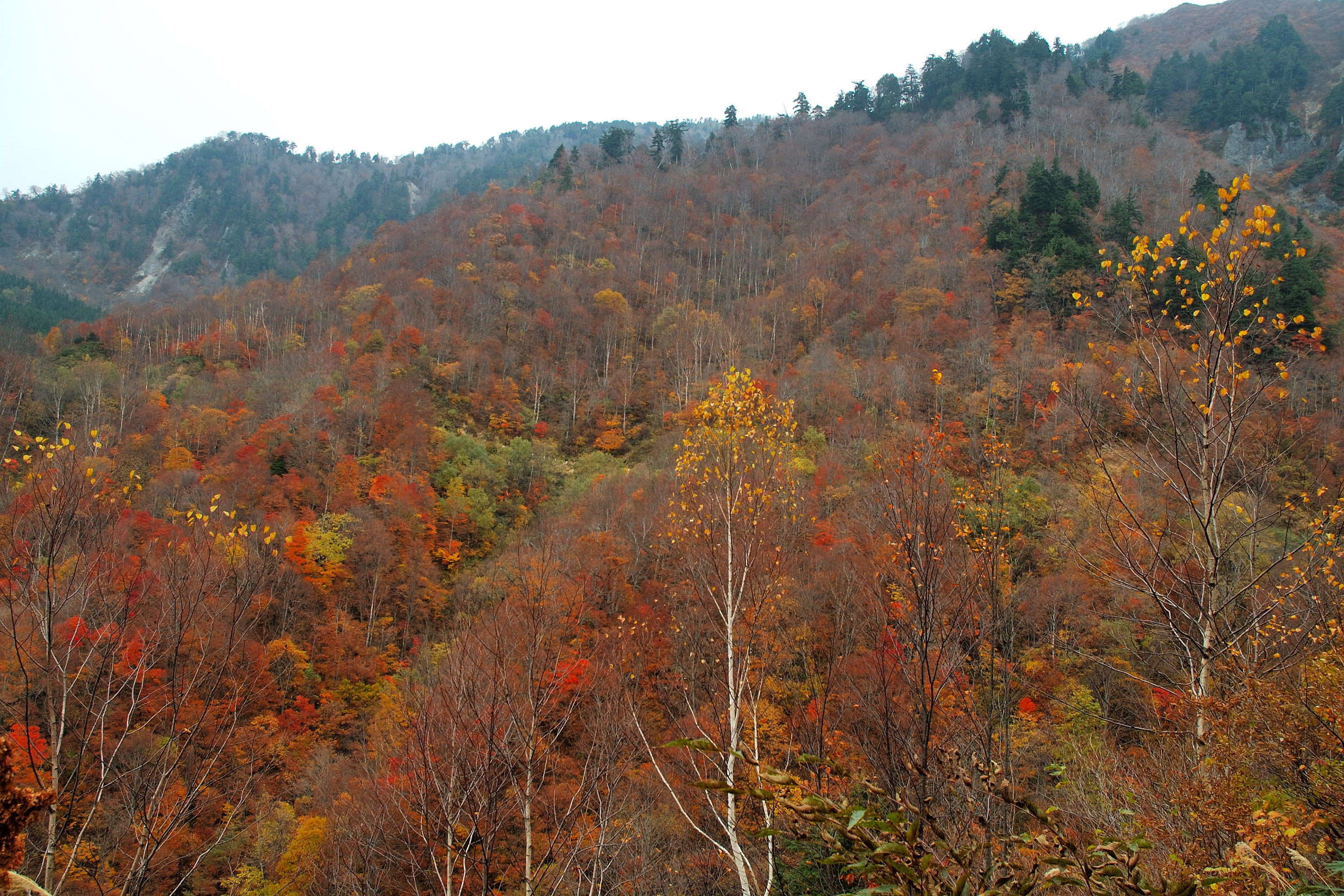
Plants have different appearance in different seasons. Any geobotanical prospecting methods relying on appearance will be season dependent.

One limitation is that this method relies on the presence of specific indicator plants, i.e., local plant species diversity. The specific indicator plants needed to determine mineral deposits may not be established in every area where those mineral deposits are located. These deposits would remain undetected if geobotanical prospecting was the only method of prospecting used. Additionally, even if the indicator plants were present but the mineral deposit had not released enough minerals into the surrounding soils, the soil composition of the area would not allow for indicator plants to intake sufficient concentrations of the desired minerals. These deposits would remain undetected. The remote sensing methods depend on climate conditions. Some indicator plants will not show all identifiable features in all seasons, i.e., some plants only bloom in summer and autumn. If climate is not conducive to accurate results, mineral deposits may remain undetected.

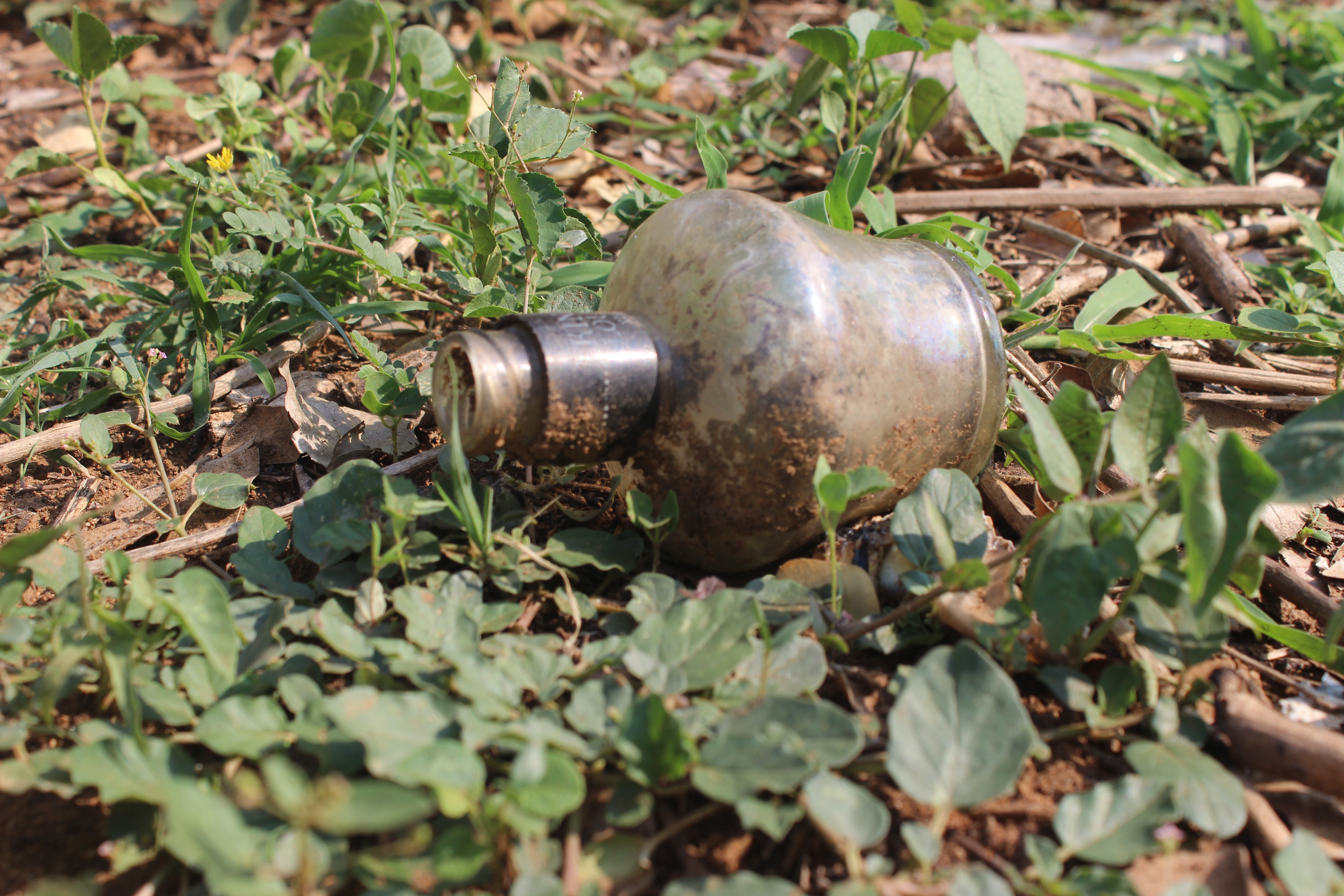
Pollutants will affect chemical composition of the soil. If the chemical composition is drastically affected, plant-soil interactions will change. This could cause changed in geobotanical prospecting methodology.

As anthropogenic influences increase, vegetation-based indicators may be heavily influenced. As land use changes and pollution could alter plant-soil interactions and element uptake patterns, results from geobotanical prospecting ventures may be incorrectly interpreted. The incorrect results could lead to misidentification of mineral deposits or missing mineral deposits altogether.

Another limitation of geobotanical prospecting is that these methods require specialized expertise in both geology and botany, two fields of expertise not commonly studied together. In order to confirm results, samples need to be analyzed in laboratories which could require specialized equipment and expertise.

Geobotanical prospecting will likely show the most efficacy when integrated with other prospecting methods, such as geological and geophysical data and surveys.
