= James Bever =

American biologist

James Bever is an American biologist. He specializes in testing basic ecological and evolutionary processes occurring within plants and their associated fungi. He is currently the Distinguished Foundation Professor in Ecology and Evolutionary Biology at the University of Kansas. He is an Elected Fellow of the American Association for the Advancement of Science (2012) and of the Ecological Society of America (2023). His most cited papers are 700 and 590. He wrote several of the first papers on Plant-soil feedback.
