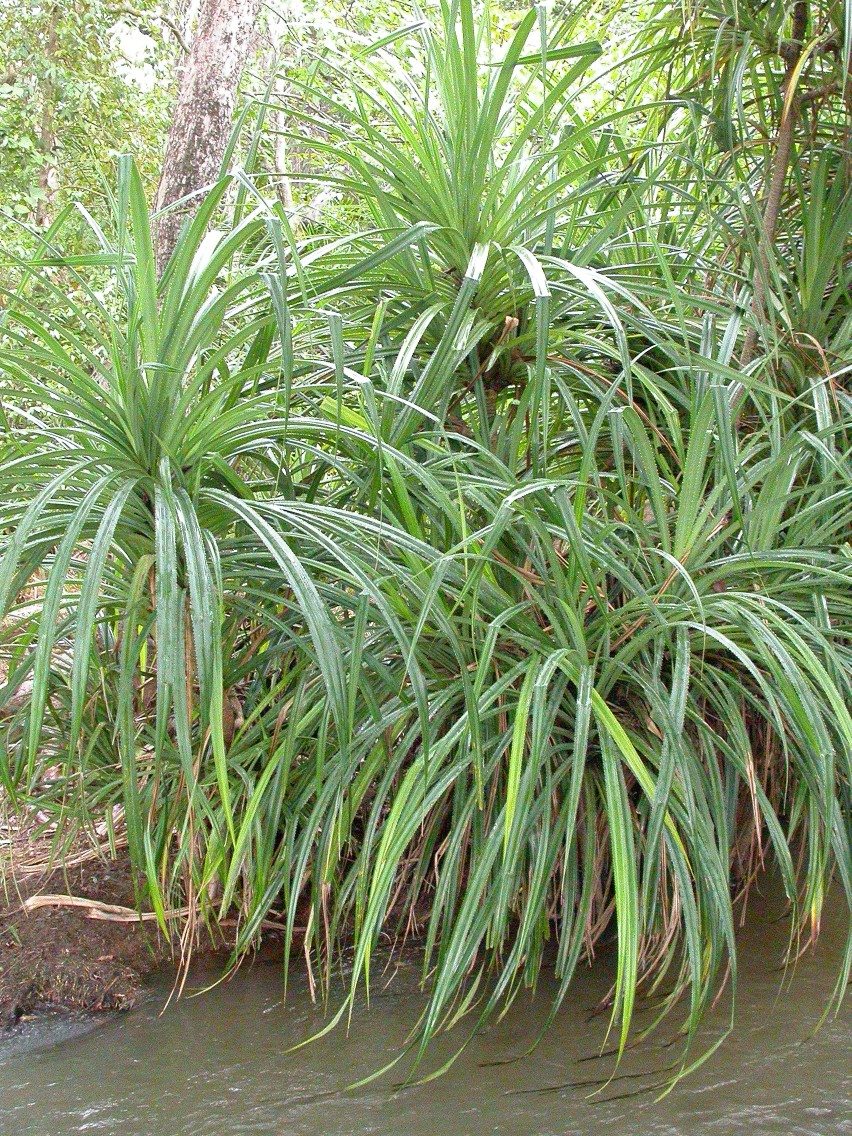

Scientific classification
- Kingdom: Plantae
- Clade: Tracheophytes
- Clade: Angiosperms
- Clade: Monocots
- Order: Pandanales
- Family: Pandanaceae
- Genus: Pandanus
- Species: P. candelabrum

Binomial name
- Pandanus candelabrum P. Beauv.

Synonyms
- Heterostigma heudelotianum Gaudich.; Pandanus barterianus Rendle; Pandanus heudelotianus (Gaudich.) Balf.f.; Pandanus kamerunensis Warb.; Pandanus kerstingii Warb.; Pandanus leonensis H.L.Wendl. nom. inval.; Pandanus togoensis Warb.; Pandanus umbellatus Martelli; Pandanus unwinii Martelli

= Pandanus candelabrum =

Species of tree

Pandanus candelabrum, also known as the chandelier tree or candelabrum tree, is a species of screw palm found in tropical Africa, notably Liberia. It only grows on kimberlite outcroppings, making it a potentially useful indicator for diamond prospecting in a process called Geobotanical prospecting.
