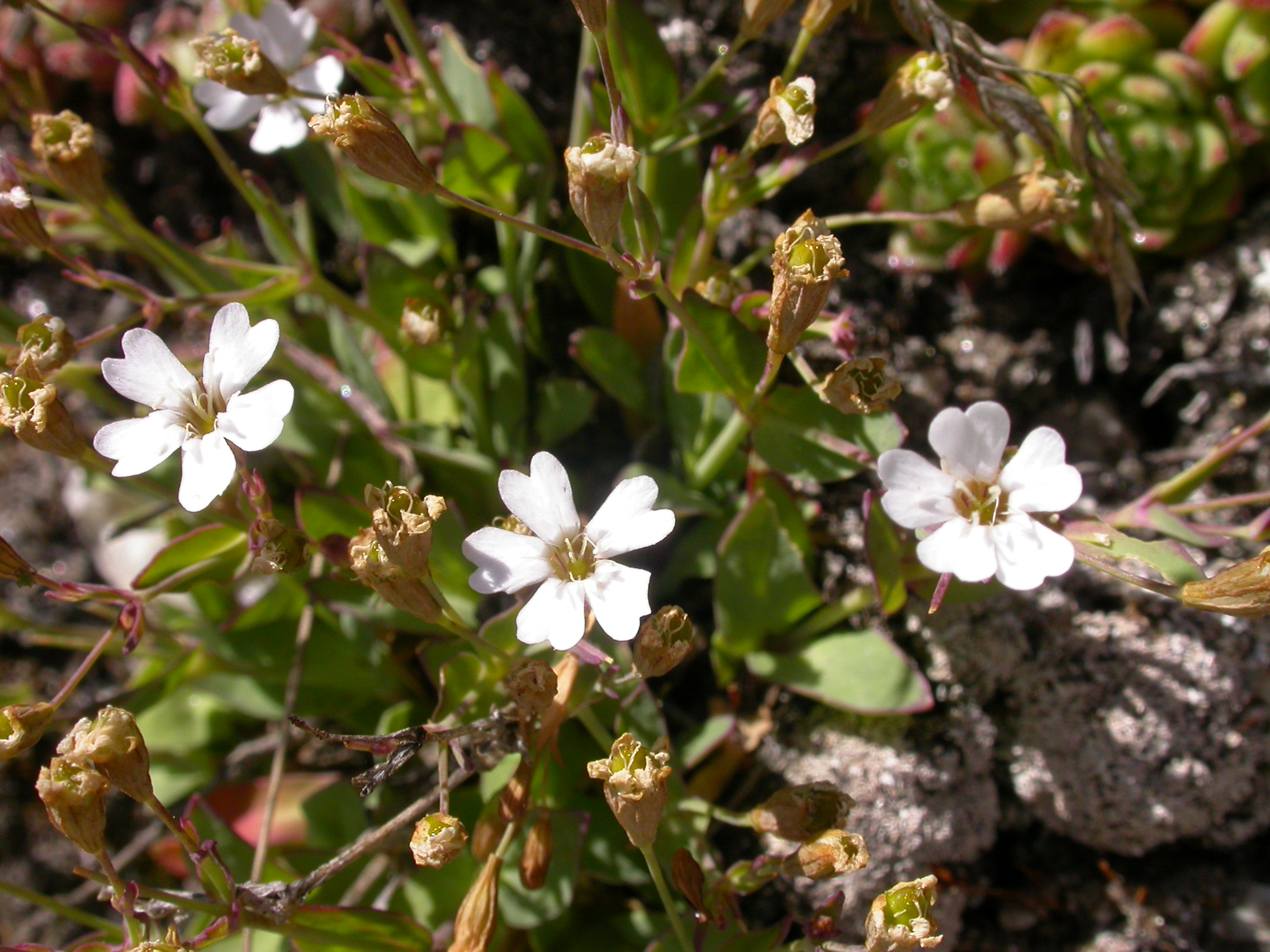

Scientific classification
- Kingdom: Plantae
- Clade: Tracheophytes
- Clade: Angiosperms
- Clade: Eudicots
- Order: Caryophyllales
- Family: Caryophyllaceae
- Genus: Atocion
- Species: A. rupestre

Binomial name
- Atocion rupestre (L.) Oxelman

Synonyms
- Cucubalus saxatilis Lam.; Minjaevia rupestris (L.) Tzvelev; Oncerum rupestre (L.) Dulac; Silene alpestris Willd. ex Nyman; Silene kaulfussii Spreng.; Silene rupestris L.

= Atocion rupestre =

Species of flowering plant

Atocion rupestre, the rock campion, is a plant species of the genus Atocion, native to Europe.
