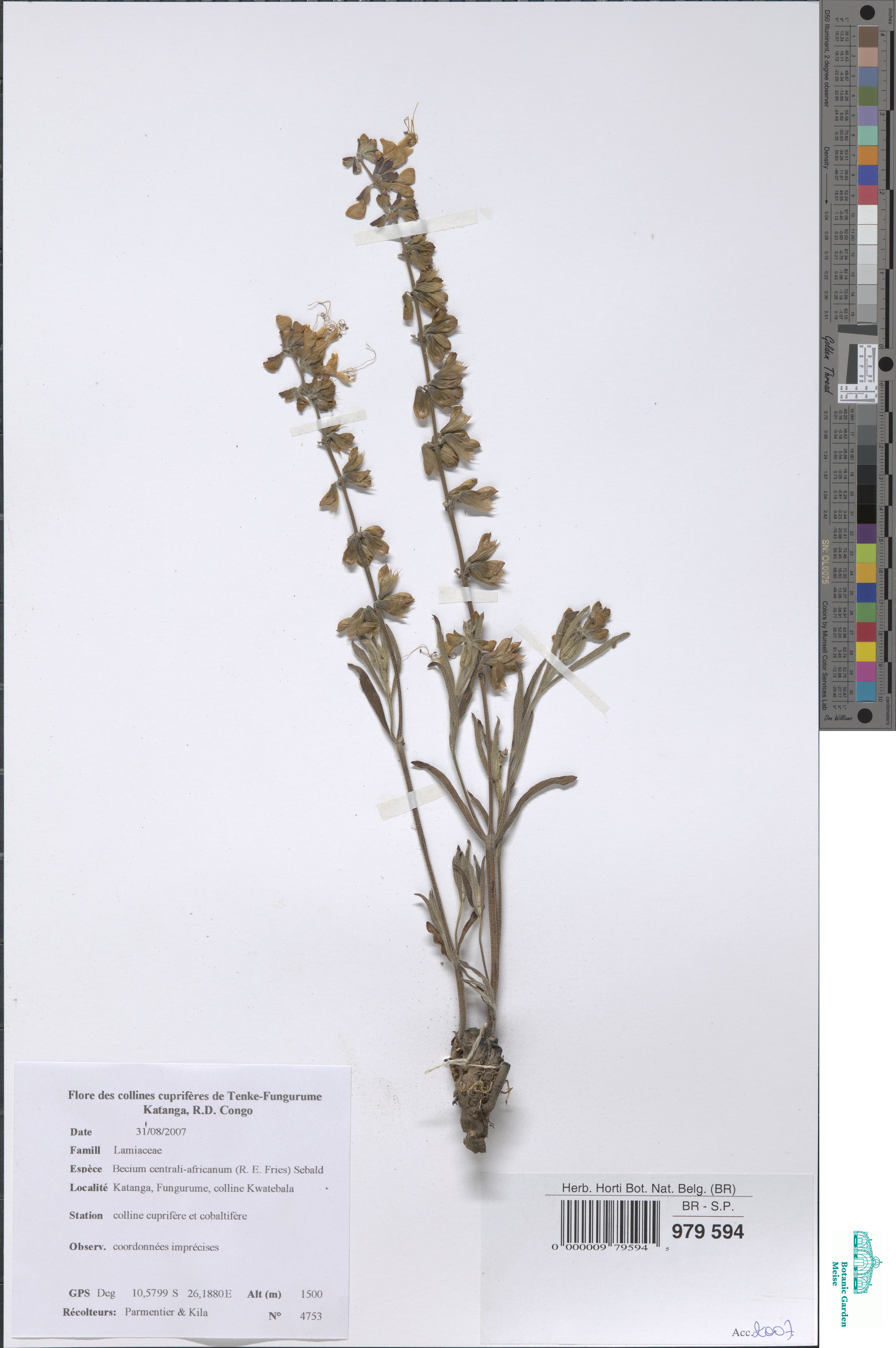

Scientific classification
- Kingdom: Plantae
- Clade: Tracheophytes
- Clade: Angiosperms
- Clade: Eudicots
- Clade: Asterids
- Order: Lamiales
- Family: Lamiaceae
- Genus: Ocimum
- Species: O. centraliafricanum

Binomial name
- Ocimum centraliafricanum R.E.Fr

Synonyms
- Becium homblei (De Wild) Duvign. & Plancke

= Ocimum centraliafricanum =

Species of flowering plant

Ocimum centraliafricanum, the copper flower or copper plant, is a perennial herb found in central Africa (DRC, Tanzania, Zambia, Zimbabwe). It is well known for its tolerance of high levels of copper in the soil, and is even used by geologists prospecting for precious metals in a process called geobotanical prospecting.

== Description ==
It is able to tolerate soils with copper concentrations of up to 15,000 ppm, and soils with nickel concentrations of almost 5000 ppm.
