= Floristics =

Study of plants across different regions

Floristics is the study of plants of geographical regions. It is a branch of phytogeography. Harvard University has a history of research with early contributions. For example, Asa Gray was a Harvard researcher who studied the plants of North America and its connections to Asia.

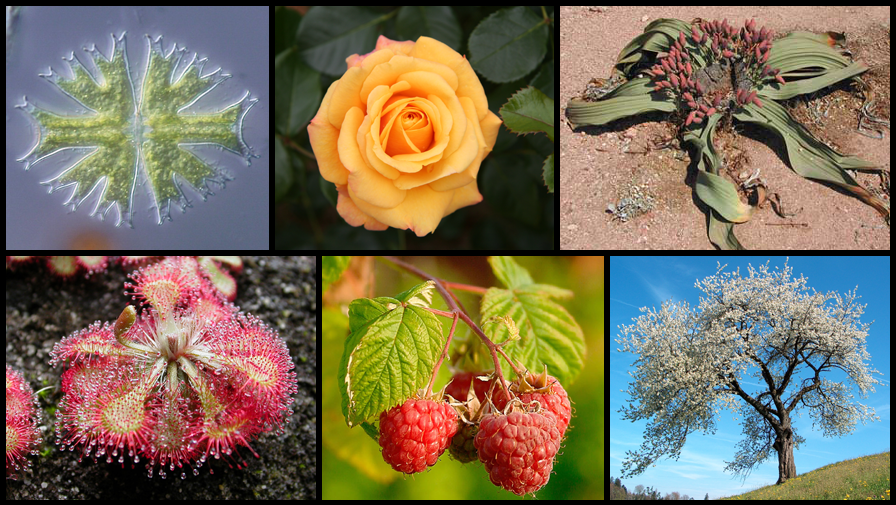
Example of floristic diversity

== Etymology ==
The words "floristic" and "floristics" originate from the Latin word Flora, from flos (flower), and the prefix "-istic", a word-forming suffix indicating a relation to or of.
