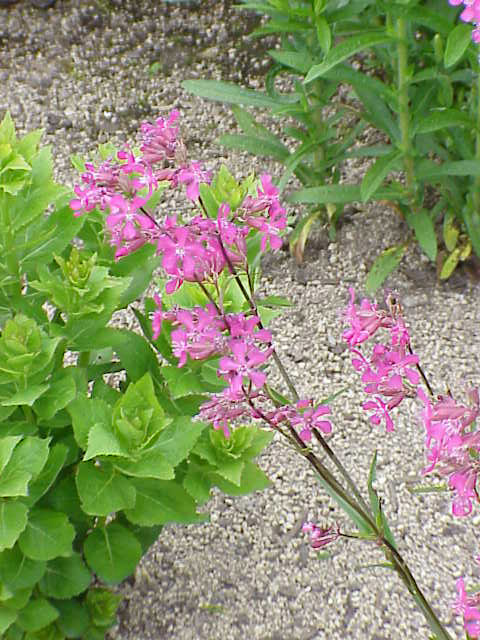

Scientific classification
- Kingdom: Plantae
- Clade: Tracheophytes
- Clade: Angiosperms
- Clade: Eudicots
- Order: Caryophyllales
- Family: Caryophyllaceae
- Genus: Viscaria
- Species: V. vulgaris

Binomial name
- Viscaria vulgaris Röhl.

Synonyms
- List: Lychnis atropurpurea (Griseb.) Nyman; Lychnis atropurpurea subsp. sartorii (Boiss.) Micevski; Lychnis sartorii (Boiss.) Hayek; Lychnis viscaria L.; Lychnis viscaria subsp. subnivalis Panov; Silene atropurpurea (Griseb.) Greuter & Burdet; Silene opposita Formánek; Steris atropurpurea (Griseb.) Holub; Steris sartorii (Boiss.) Ikonn.; Steris viscaria (L.) Raf.; Viscaria atropurpurea Griseb.; Viscaria neglecta G.Don; Viscaria sartorii Boiss.; Viscaria vallesiaca (Thell.) Bergmans

= Viscaria vulgaris =

Species of flowering plant

Viscaria vulgaris, the sticky catchfly or clammy campion, is a flowering plant in the family Caryophyllaceae.

It is an upright perennial growing to 60 cm (24 in) in height. The leaves are lanceolate. The flowers, which are 20 mm across and bright rosy-pink, appear in long whorled spikes from May to August. It grows on cliffs and rocky places. In Central Europe, Lychnis viscaria can be found in a variety of habitats, such as dry meadows, lush grasslands, stony slopes, rocky outcrops of hilly terrain, and open or sparse canopied forests. It has taken over vineyards and roadside vegetation, and farming methods that preserve open vegetation are advantageous to it.

The Latin name Viscaria means "sticky", and refers to the stickiness of the stem just below the leaf joints. The English common names reference the same feature.

Viscaria vulgaris is also grown as an ornamental garden plant. In British horticultural literature it is often referred to by its synonym Lychnis viscaria. Bumblebees are considered as main pollinators of this species. The cultivar 'Splendens Plena', a double-flowered form, has won the Royal Horticultural Society's Award of Garden Merit.

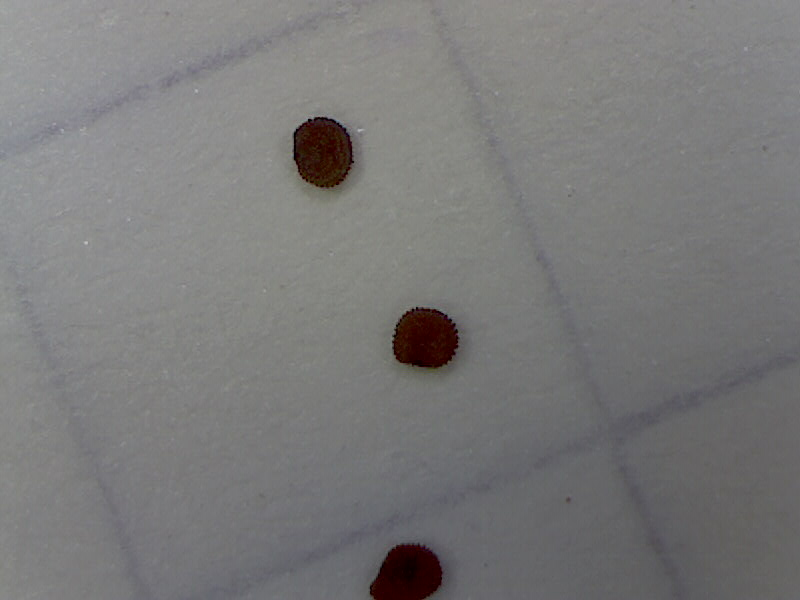
Seed, background lines are 5 mm (0.20 in) apart

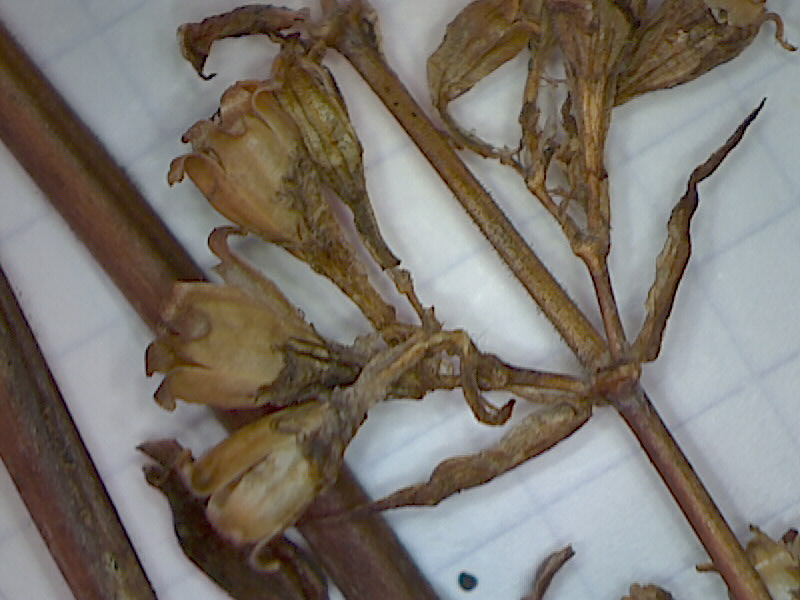
Whorl of seed capsules, background lines are 5mm apart

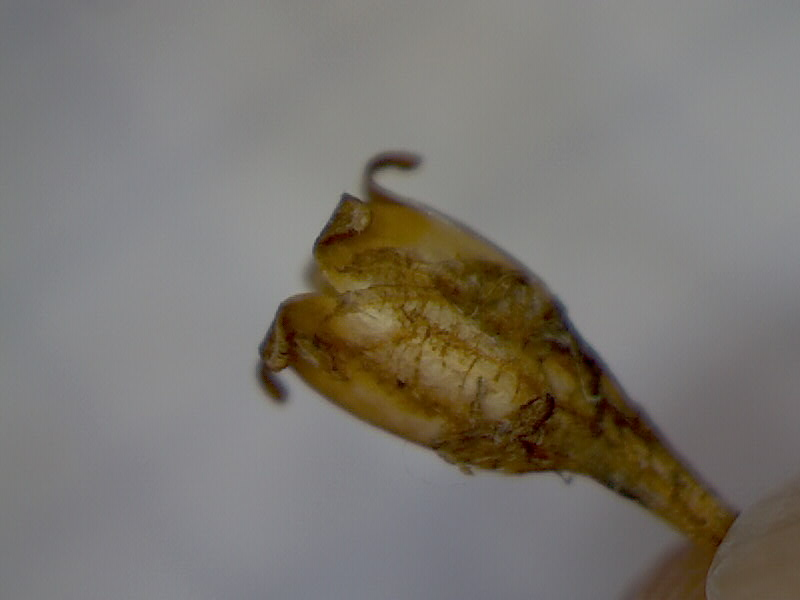
Seed capsule, viewed from side

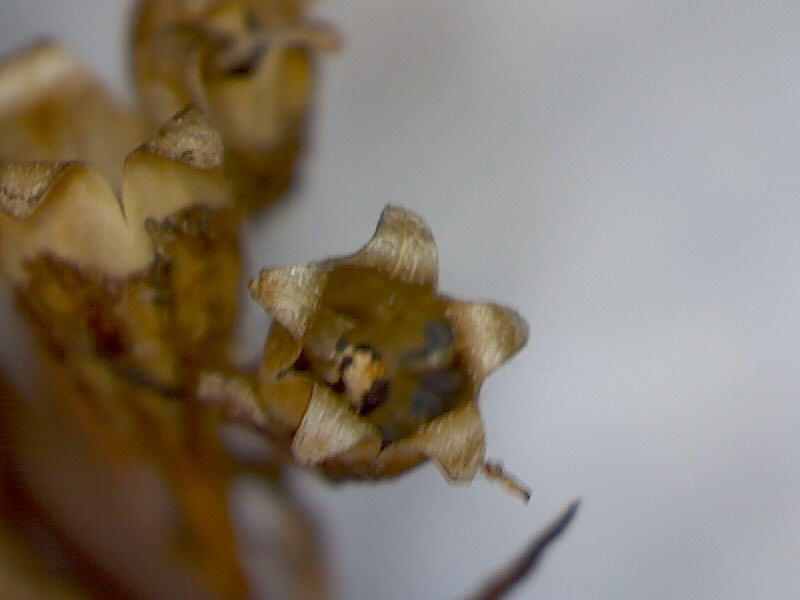
Seed capsule, viewed end on
