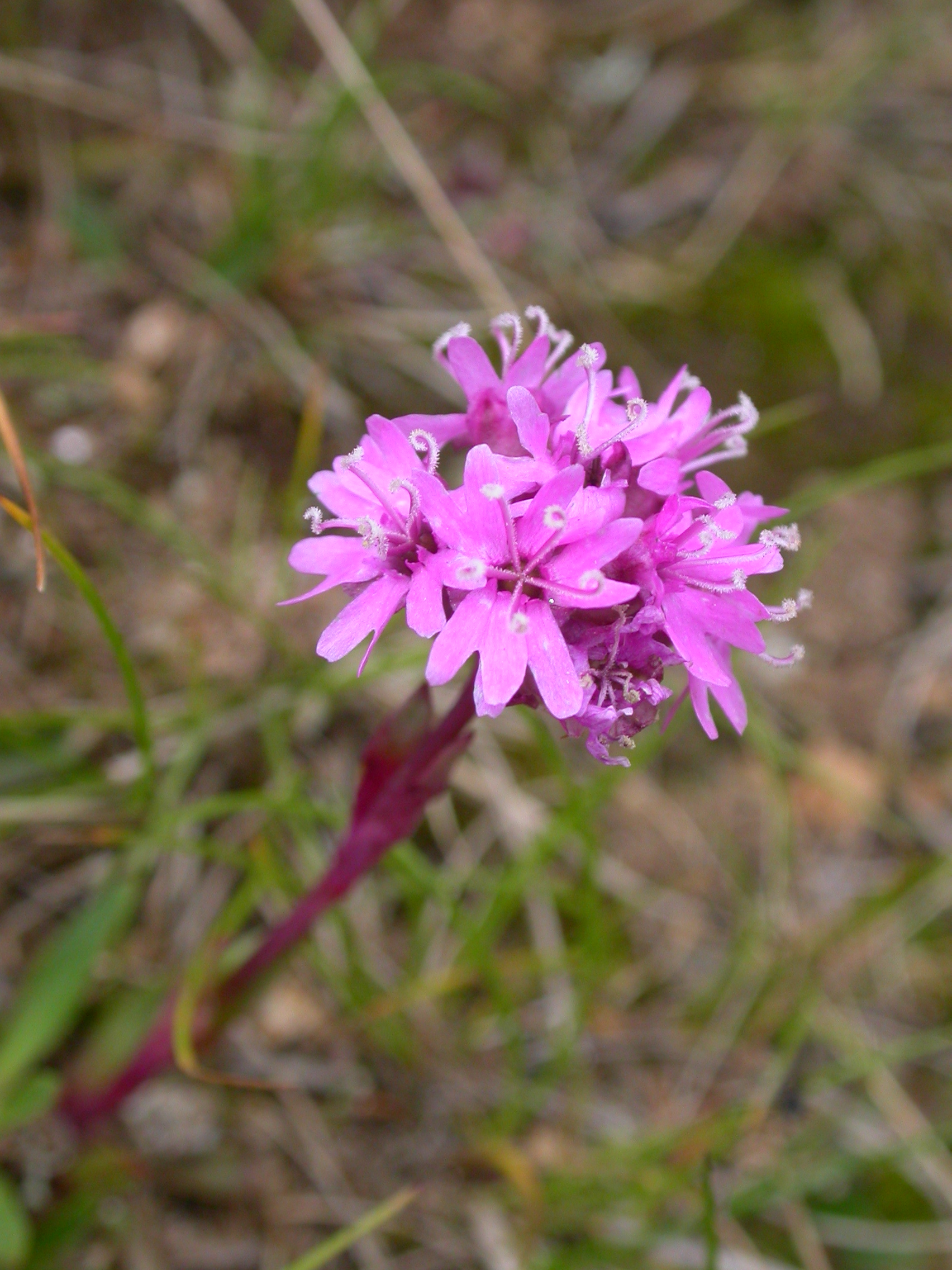

Scientific classification
- Kingdom: Plantae
- Clade: Tracheophytes
- Clade: Angiosperms
- Clade: Eudicots
- Order: Caryophyllales
- Family: Caryophyllaceae
- Genus: Silene
- Species: S. suecica

Binomial name
- Silene suecica (Lodd.) Greuter & Burdet

Synonyms
- Lychnis alpina L. Lychnis suecica Greuter & Burdet; Viscaria alpina G. Don

= Silene suecica =

Species of flowering plant

Silene suecica (also known as Viscaria alpina) is a species of plant in the family Caryophyllaceae. Its common name is red Alpine catchfly and its natural habitat is the mountains of Norway and Sweden but it is sometimes found near the coasts and it is also found in Great Britain, the Alps and the Pyrenees, Greenland and North America.

== Description ==
Alpine catchfly is a perennial plant growing to a height of 10 to 40 cm (4 to 16 in). The stems are unbranched and erect with a glossy surface often tinged with red. The leaves are in opposite pairs, the lower ones being stalked and forming a rosette while the upper ones are unstalked. The leaves are narrow and lanceolate with entire margins. The inflorescence is a small umbel and the flowers are fragrant. The calyx is five-lobed and tubular and a greenish-purple colour. The corolla is regular, from 1 to 2 cm (0.4 to 0.8 in) in diameter with five pink, deeply notched petals. There are several stamens, some of which may be vestigial, and five styles. The fruit is a five-chambered capsule. This plant flowers between June and August.

== Distribution and habitat ==
Alpine catchfly is found in northern Europe including Norway, Sweden, Finland and Lapland and in the Alps, northern Apennines and the Pyrenees where it grows on rocks including extra-alkaline serpentine rocks, gravel banks beside rivers, sand banks, sea cliffs and nutrient-poor, stony areas. In Greenland and North America it is found on tundra, barren rocky areas, gulleys and riverside shingle, grassy slopes and sea cliffs. In general it thrives where other plants that are less tolerant of high concentrations of copper and heavy metals in the soil do not.

== Uses ==
Because of its ability to grow in soils with heavy amounts of copper, Silene suecica is used as a copper content indicator in geobotanical prospecting.
