= Steve Bever =

American baseball coach and player

Current position
- Title: Head coach
- Team: Girard HS (KS)
- Conference: CNC League

Biographical details
- Born: 1946 or 1947 (age 79–80); Farlington, Kansas

Playing career
- 1966–1969: Pittsburg State

Coaching career (HC unless noted)
- 1991–2012: Pittsburg State
- 2016–present: Girard HS (KS)

Administrative career (AD unless noted)
- 1991–2015: Pittsburg State (assistant AD)

Head coaching record
- Overall: 565–529

Accomplishments and honors

Championships
- 2 MIAA regular season MIAA Tournament

Steve Bever is an American baseball coach and player, who was the head coach at Pittsburg State University from 1991 to 2012. Bever was the second coach in program history after the university restarted it after a 17 year break. Bever played for the Gorillas from 1966 to 1969.

== Career ==
=== Collegiate career ===
In February 1990, Bever was hired as Pittsburg State University's second head baseball coach in school history after a 17-year break due to budget cuts. When Bever was hired, Pittsburg State had finished transitioning into the NCAA Division II and its new conference, the Mid-America Intercollegiate Athletics Association. During his 22 years after rebuilding the program, Bever led the Gorillas to two MIAA championships, four NCAA Tournament appearances, and led the program to a 30+ win season just four years after it restarted.

=== Post-collegiate career ===
Four years after retirement in 2016, Bever returned to coaching, but at the high school level. He is the current head coach at his alma mater, Girard High School.

== Head coach record ==
Statistics overview
Season	Team	Overall	Conference	Standing	Postseason
Pittsburg State Gorillas (Mid-America Intercollegiate Athletics Association) (1991–2012)
1991	Pittsburg State	15–32	5–9		
1992	Pittsburg State	17–26	7–5		
1993	Pittsburg State	15–18	7–8		
1994	Pittsburg State	30–20	12–4		
1995	Pittsburg State	22–22	10–10		
1996	Pittsburg State	23–25	11–7		
1997	Pittsburg State	39–18	17–7		NCAA Regionals
1998	Pittsburg State	36–16	17–5		NCAA Regionals
1999	Pittsburg State	36–14	12–7		NCAA Regionals
2000	Pittsburg State	29–21	15–14		
2001	Pittsburg State	26–25	13–17		
2002	Pittsburg State	39–19	13–17		NCAA Regionals
2003	Pittsburg State	32–19	15–14		
2004	Pittsburg State	34–25	17–14		
2005	Pittsburg State	29–21	16–14		
2006	Pittsburg State	27–25	13–17		
2007	Pittsburg State	24–30	15–20		
2008	Pittsburg State	22–28	16–20		
2009	Pittsburg State	15–38	12–26		
2010	Pittsburg State	15–38	12–26		
2011	Pittsburg State	20–30	16–28		
2012	Pittsburg State	20–28	16–22		
Pittsburg State:		545–529 (.507)	287–311 (.480)		
Total:		545–529 (.507)			
National champion Postseason invitational champion Conference regular season champion Conference regular season and conference tournament champion Division regular season champion Division regular season and conference tournament champion Conference tournament champion
