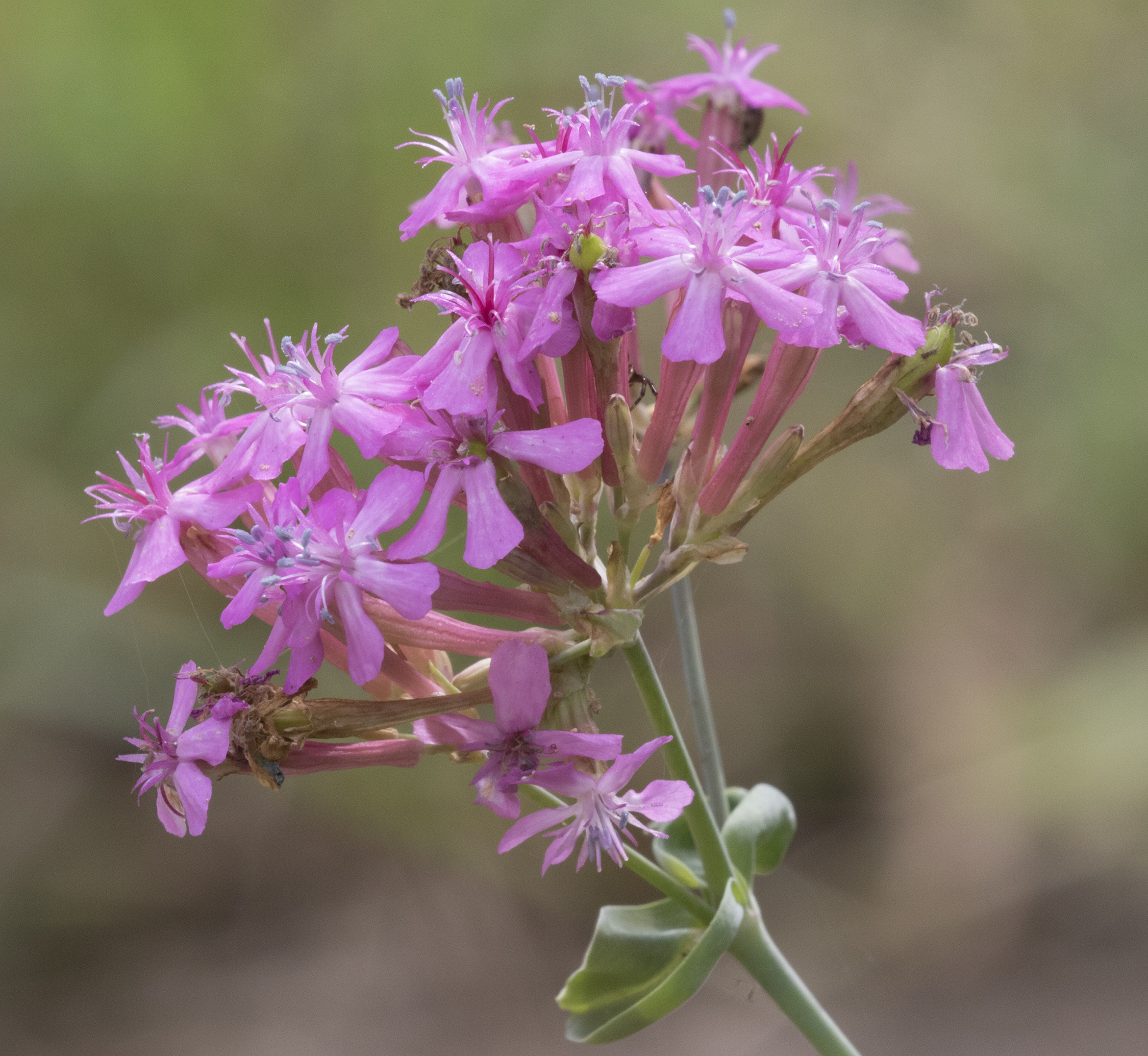
- Atocion compactum

Scientific classification
- Kingdom: Plantae
- Clade: Tracheophytes
- Clade: Angiosperms
- Clade: Eudicots
- Order: Caryophyllales
- Family: Caryophyllaceae
- Tribe: Sileneae
- Genus: Atocion; Adans.

Species
- See text

Synonyms
- Minjaevia Tzvelev

= Atocion =

Genus of plants in the carnation family

Atocion is a genus of flowering plants in the family Caryophyllaceae, tribe Sileneae, native to Europe, the Caucasus region, and the Middle East as far east as Iran. The species diversity is highest in the Balkans.

== Species ==
The following species are recognised in the genus Atocion:

- Atocion armeria (L.) Raf.
- Atocion compactum (Fisch. ex Hornem.) Tzvelev
- Atocion lerchenfeldianum (Baumg.) M.Popp
- Atocion reuterianum (Boiss. & Blanche) Frajman
- Atocion rupestre (L.) Oxelman
- Atocion scythicinum (Coode & Cullen) Frajman
