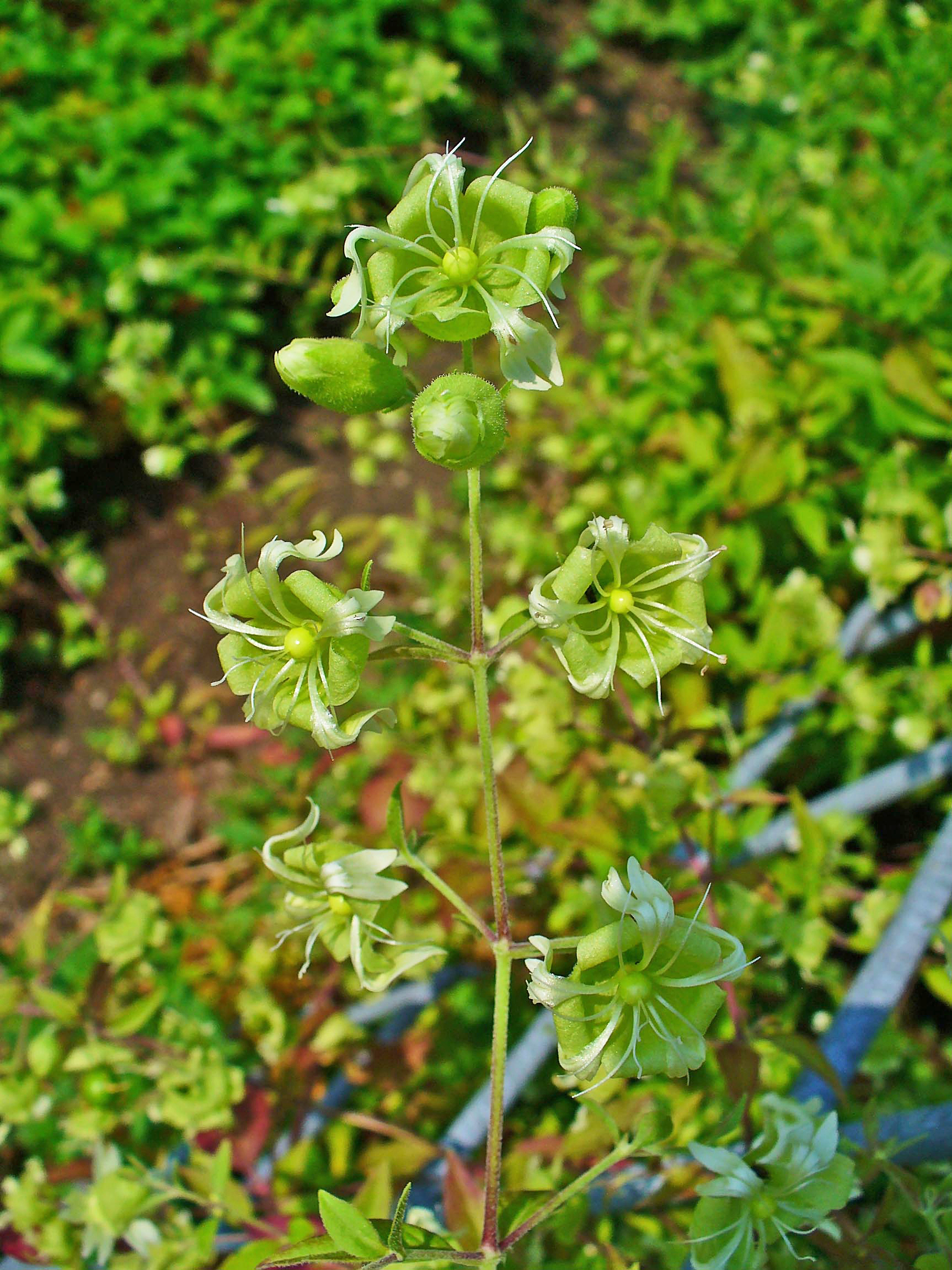

Scientific classification
- Kingdom: Plantae
- Clade: Tracheophytes
- Clade: Angiosperms
- Clade: Eudicots
- Order: Caryophyllales
- Family: Caryophyllaceae
- Genus: Silene
- Species: S. baccifera

Binomial name
- Silene baccifera Roth, 1788

Synonyms
- Oberna behen (L.) Ikonn. Silene cucubalus Wibel; Cucubalus baccatus Gueldenst. ex Ledeb., 1842; Cucubalus baccifer L., 1753basionym Cucubalus baccifer var. angustifolius L.H.Zhou, 1983; Cucubalus baccifer var. cavalerieri H.Lév., 1914; Cucubalus baccifer var. japonicus Miq., 1866; Cucubalus divaricatus Clairv., 1811; Cucubalus horizontalis Moench, 1794; Cucubalus japonicus (Miq.) Vorosch., 1960; Lychnanthos scandens C.C.Gmel., 1806; Lychnanthos volubilis S.G.Gmel., 1770; Lychnis baccifera (L.) Scop., 1771; Scribaea baccifera (L.) Schur, 1866; Scribaea cucubalus Borkh., 1793; Scribaea divaricata G.Gaertn., B.Mey. & Scherb., 1800; Silene baccifera var. japonica (Miq.) H.Ohashi & H.Nakai, 1996; Silene fissa Salisb., 1796

= Silene baccifera =

Species of plant

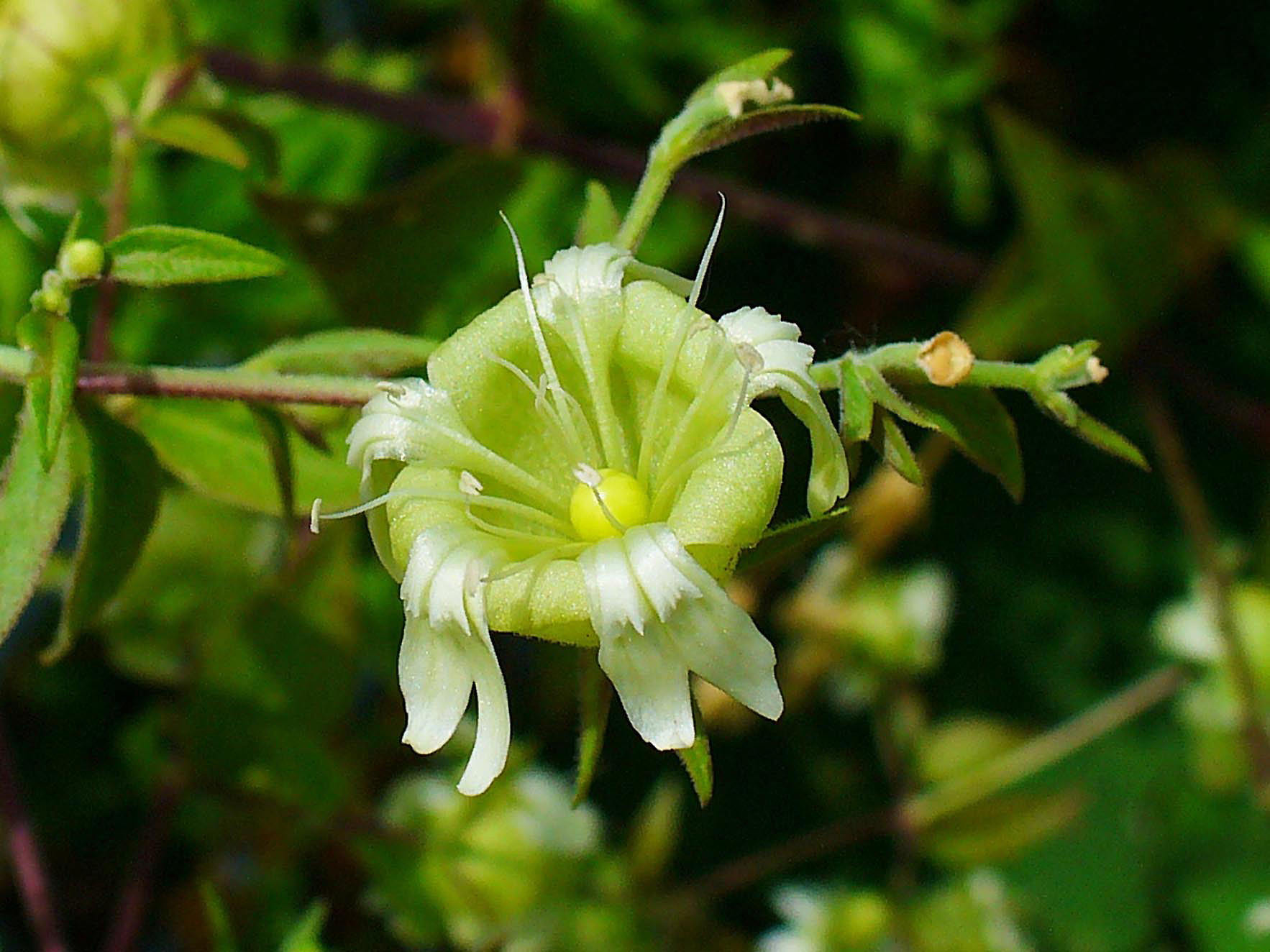
Silene baccifera flowers

Silene baccifera is a plant species of the genus Silene of the family Caryophyllaceae. It is native to Europe, but is also widespread in temperate regions of Asia and North Africa.
