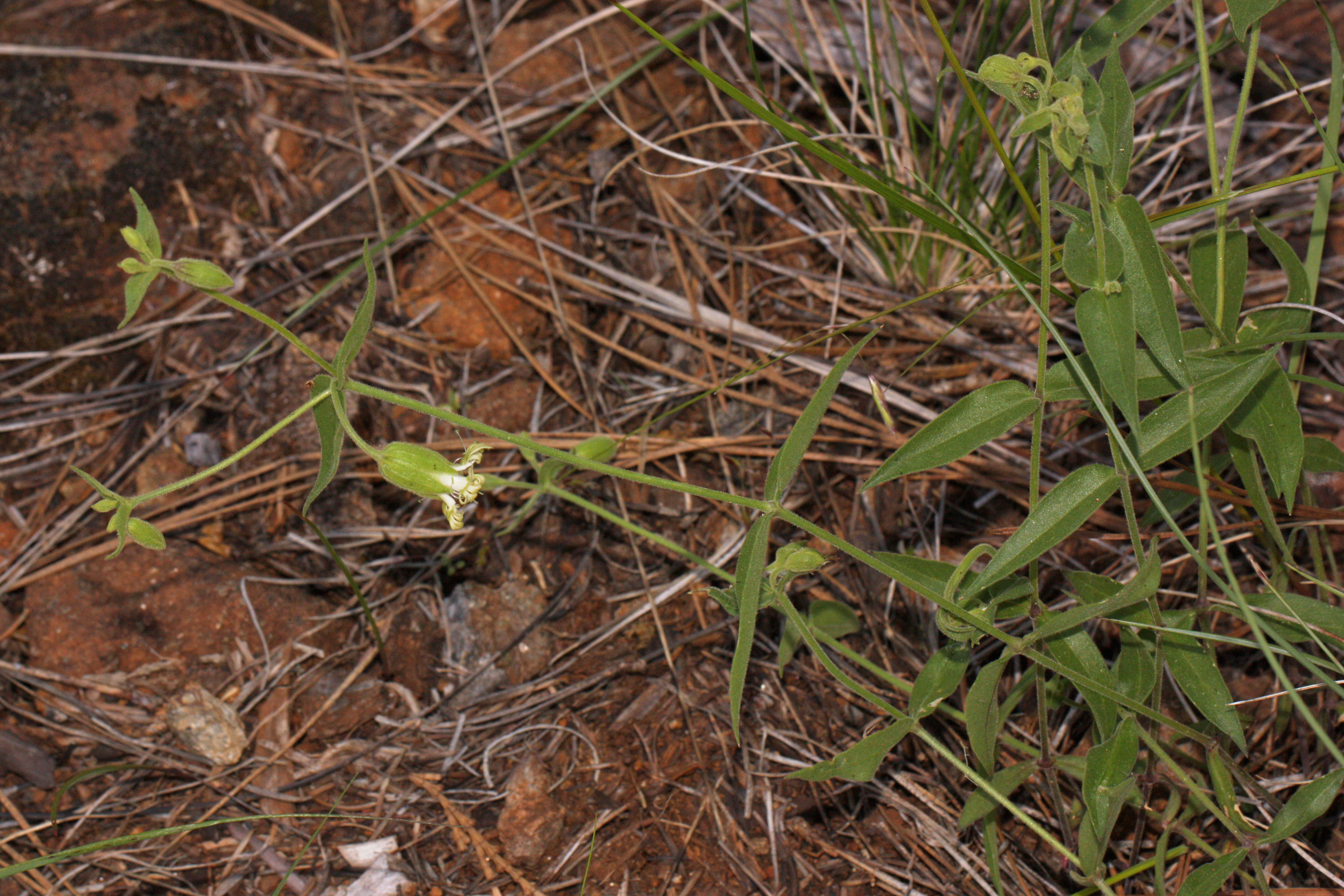

Scientific classification
- Kingdom: Plantae
- Clade: Tracheophytes
- Clade: Angiosperms
- Clade: Eudicots
- Order: Caryophyllales
- Family: Caryophyllaceae
- Genus: Silene
- Species: S. campanulata

Binomial name
- Silene campanulata S.Watson

= Silene campanulata =

Species of flowering plant

Silene campanulata is a species of flowering plant in the family Caryophyllaceae known by the common names Red Mountain catchfly and bell catchfly. It may be a synonym of Silene greenei.

It is native to the mountains of Oregon and northern California.

== Description ==
Silene campanulata is a perennial herb growing up to 40 centimetres (16 inches) tall with many small shoots coming from a woody, branching caudex with a taproot. The erect stems are usually hairy and often have glandular, sticky patches on their upper parts. The leaves are up to 5 cm (2 in) long by 3 cm wide, the lower ones lance-shaped to rounded, and the upper ones linear or oval.

Nodding flowers occur in a terminal cyme at the top of the stem, as well as in some of the leaf axils. Each has a hairy, often glandular calyx of fused sepals. This bell-shaped green or purplish calyx is open at the top, revealing five white, greenish, or pale pink petals. The petals have multilobed or fringed tips. The stamens and three long styles protrude from the flower's center.

== Subspecies ==
Subspecies include:

- Silene campanulata ssp. campanulata — Red Mountain catchfly; endemic to California; designated as endangered under the California Endangered Species Act.
- Silene campanulata ssp. glandulosa — Bell catchfly, in California and Oregon.
- Silene campanulata subsp. greenei — Greene's catchfly, in California and Oregon.

== Distribution and habitat ==
It is native to the mountains of Oregon and northern California, where it grows in forest and chaparral habitat, sometimes on serpentine soils.
