= Silene greenei =

Scientific classification
- Kingdom: Plantae
- Clade: Tracheophytes
- Clade: Angiosperms
- Clade: Eudicots
- Order: Caryophyllales
- Family: Caryophyllaceae
- Genus: Silene
- Species: S. greenei

Binomial name
- Silene greenei (S.Watson) Howell

Subspecies
- Silene greenei greenei (S. Watson) Howell; Silene greenei angustifolia (F.N. Williams) Rabeler & Gandhi

Species of carpetweed

Silene greenei, commonly known as bell catchfly, is a species of flowering plant in the family Caryophyllaceae. It is a perennial herb that is native to the western United States (Oregon and California).

== Description ==
Specimens have a taproot and a stout, woody, many-branched caudex, producing many erect-to-straggling little branched flowering shoots. Stems are 5–40 cm long with trichomes, soft to scabrous with eglandular or viscid-glandular, especially distally. They have very rarely glabrous and with several pairs of two leaves with equaling or shorter than stem. Flowers have ten-veined sepals and are often greenish but rarely can be pink or purple. Seeds are brown and are 2-2.5 mm broad.

== Distribution and habitat ==
The nominate subspecies S. g. greenei, the common bell catchfly, is native to northern California and southern Oregon. S. g. angustifolia, the red mountain catchfly, is considered Critically Imperilled and only found in the mountains of California.
