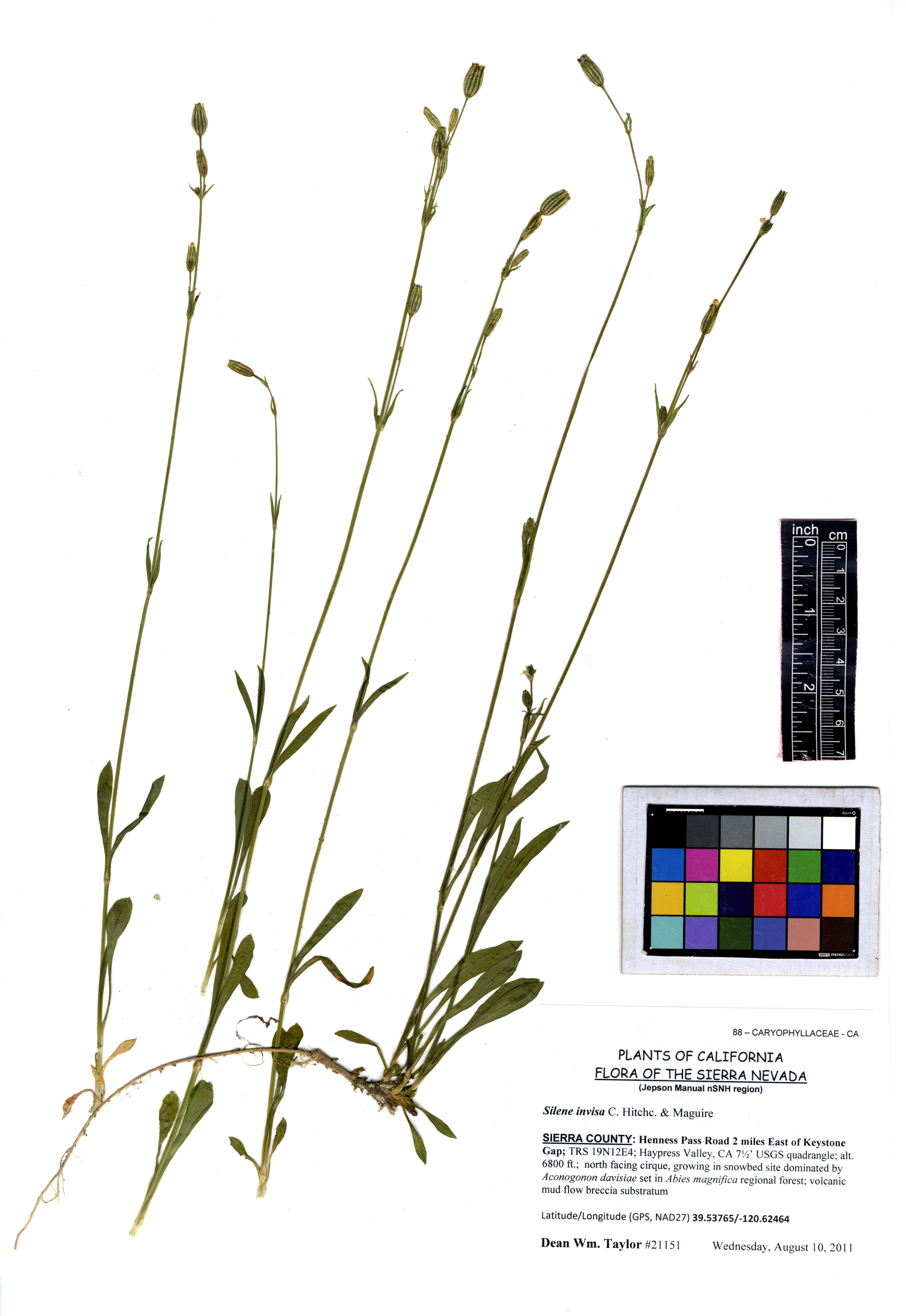
- Herbarium specimen

Scientific classification
- Kingdom: Plantae
- Clade: Tracheophytes
- Clade: Angiosperms
- Clade: Eudicots
- Order: Caryophyllales
- Family: Caryophyllaceae
- Genus: Silene
- Species: S. invisa

Binomial name
- Silene invisa C.L.Hitchc. & Maguire

= Silene invisa =

Species of flowering plant

Silene invisa is a species of flowering plant in the family Caryophyllaceae known by the common names red fir catchfly and short-petaled campion.

It is endemic to California, where it is known only from the southernmost Cascade Range and northernmost Sierra Nevada. It grows in the coniferous forests of the mountains.

== Description ==
Silene invisa is a perennial herb growing up to about 40 centimeters tall from a leafy caudex and taproot. The linear or lance-shaped leaves are a few centimeters long low on the plant and smaller higher up the stem.

The inflorescence is a solitary flower or a cyme of up to three flowers at the top of the stem. Each flower has a bell-shaped calyx of fused sepals lined with ten green veins and covered in short, glandular hairs. The strap-shaped or rectangular petals have blunt tips or may be notched. They are whitish to pinkish or lavender and sometimes barely protrude from the calyx.
