= Gonochorism =

State of having just one sex in any individual organism

In biology, gonochorism is a sexual system where there are two sexes and each individual organism is either male or female. The term gonochorism is usually applied in animal species, the vast majority of which are gonochoric.

Gonochorism contrasts with simultaneous hermaphroditism but it may be hard to tell if a species is gonochoric or sequentially hermaphroditic e.g. parrotfish, Patella ferruginea. However, in gonochoric species individuals remain either male or female throughout their lives. Species that reproduce by thelytokous parthenogenesis and do not have males can still be classified as gonochoric.

== Terminology ==
The term is derived from Greek gone 'generation' + chorizein 'to separate'. The term gonochorism originally came from German Gonochorismus.

Gonochorism is also referred to as unisexualism or gonochory.

== Evolution ==
Gonochorism has evolved independently multiple times. It is very evolutionarily stable in animals. Its stability and advantages have received little attention. Gonochorism owes its origin to the evolution of anisogamy, but it is unclear if the evolution of anisogamy first led to hermaphroditism or gonochorism.

Gonochorism is thought to be the ancestral state in polychaetes, Hexacorallia, nematodes, and hermaphroditic fishes. Gonochorism is thought to be ancestral in hermaphroditic fishes because it is widespread in basal clades of fish and other vertebrate lineages.

Two papers from 2008 have suggested that transitions between hermaphroditism and gonochorism or vice versa have occurred in animals between 10 and 20 times. In a 2017 study involving 165 taxon groups, more evolutionary transitions from gonochorism to hermaphroditism were found than the reverse.

== Use across species ==
=== Animals ===
The term gonochorism is most often used for animal species, an estimated 95% of which are gonochoric. It is very common in vertebrate species, 99% of which are gonochoric. About 98% of fishes are gonochoric. Mammals (including humans) and birds are solely gonochoric. Tardigrades are almost always gonochoric. About 75% of snails are gonochoric. Most arthropods including a majority of crustaceans are gonochoric.

In animals, sex is most often genetically determined, but may be determined by other mechanisms. For example, alligators use temperature-dependent sex determination during egg incubation.

=== Plants ===
The term gonochorism is not usually applied to plants. Vascular plants which have single-sex individuals are called dioecious, while bryophytes with single-sex individuals are dioicous. In flowering plants, individual flowers may be hermaphroditic (i.e., with both stamens and ovaries) or dioecious (unisexual), having either no stamens (i.e., no male parts) or no ovaries (i.e., no female parts). Among flowering plants with unisexual flowers, some also produce hermaphrodite flowers, and the three types may occur in different arrangements on the same or separate plants. Plant species can thus be hermaphrodite, monoecious, dioecious, trioecious, polygamomonoecious, polygamodioecious, andromonoecious, or gynomonoecious.

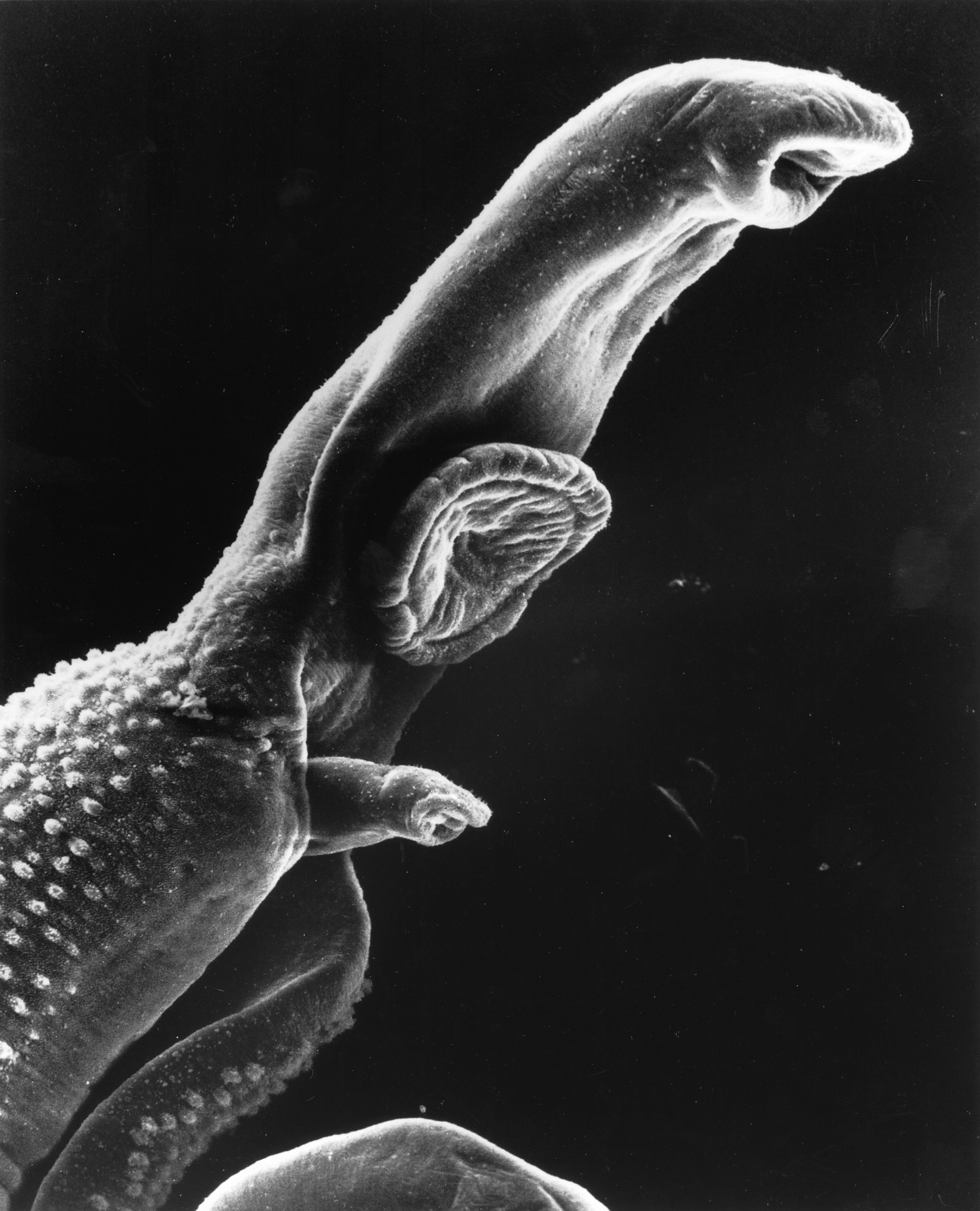
Unlike most flatworms, schistosomes are gonochoric. The narrow female can be seen emerging from the thicker male's gynecophoral canal below his ventral sucker.

Examples of species with gonochoric or dioecious pollination include hollies and kiwifruit. In these plants the male plant that supplies the pollen is referred to as the pollenizer.

== Other reproductive strategies ==
Gonochorism stands in contrast to other reproductive strategies such as asexual reproduction and hermaphroditism. Closely related taxa can have differing sexual strategies – for example, the genus Ophryotrocha contains species that are gonochoric and species that are hermaphrodites.

The sex of an individual may also change during its lifetime – this sequential hermaphroditism can, for example, be found in parrotfish and cockles.

== See also ==
- Diclinous
- Monoclinous
- Plant sexuality
- Gynogenesis
