= Plant reproductive morphology =

Parts of plant enabling sexual reproduction

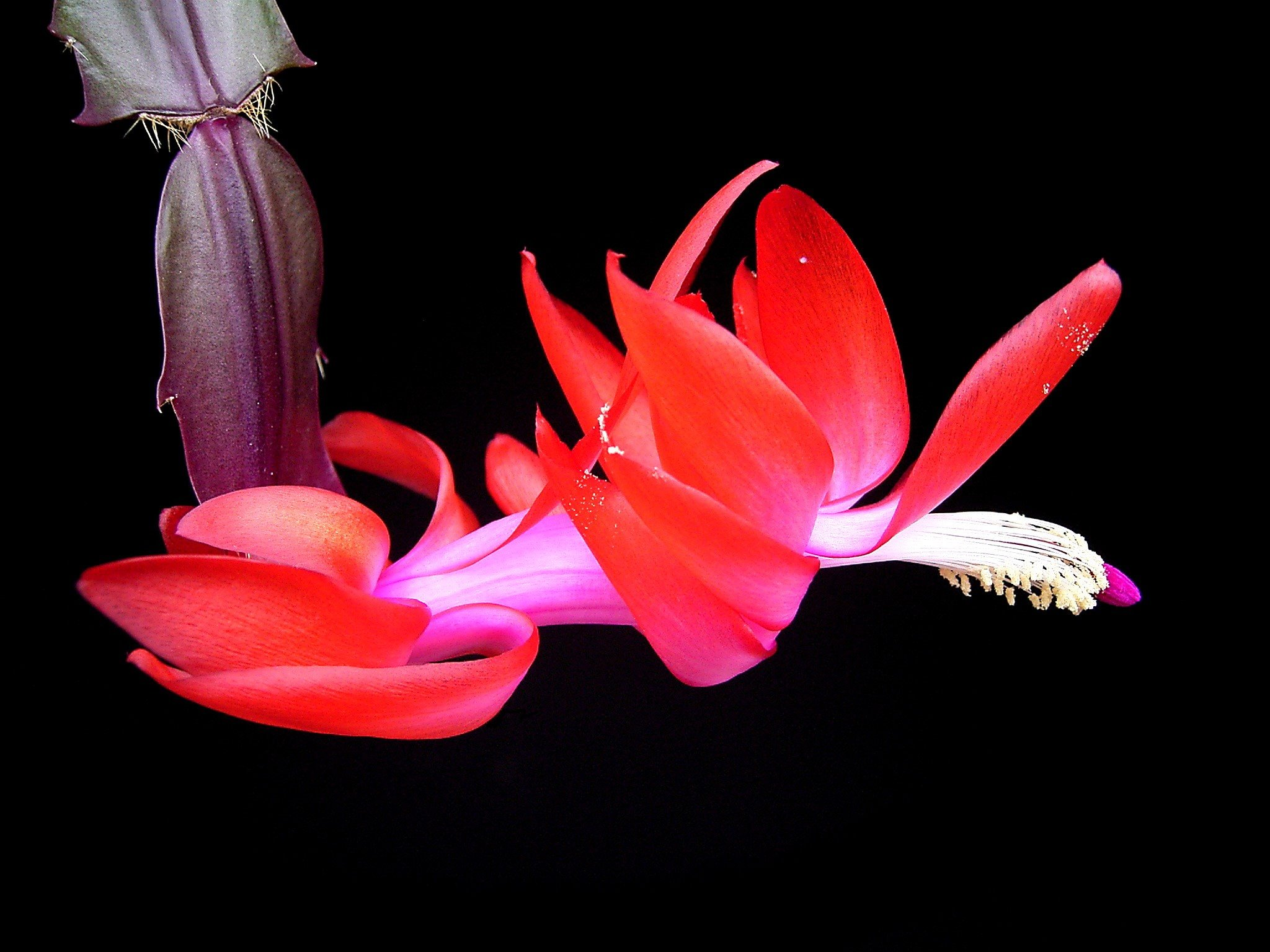
Close-up of a Schlumbergera flower, showing part of the gynoecium (specifically the stigma and part of the style) and the stamens that surround it

Plant reproductive morphology is the study of the physical form and structure (the morphology) of those parts of plants directly or indirectly concerned with sexual reproduction.

Among all living organisms, flowers, which are the reproductive structures of flowering plants (angiosperms), are the most varied physically and show a correspondingly great diversity in methods of reproduction. Plants that are not flowering plants (green algae, mosses, liverworts, hornworts, ferns and gymnosperms such as conifers) also have complex interplays between morphological adaptation and environmental factors in their sexual reproduction.

The breeding system, or how the sperm from one plant fertilizes the ovum of another, depends on the reproductive morphology, and is the single most important determinant of the genetic structure of nonclonal plant populations.

Christian Konrad Sprengel (1793) studied the reproduction of flowering plants and for the first time it was understood that the pollination process involved both biotic and abiotic interactions. Charles Darwin's theories of natural selection utilized this work to build his theory of evolution, which includes analysis of the coevolution of flowers and their insect pollinators.

== Plant sexual reproduction and terminology ==
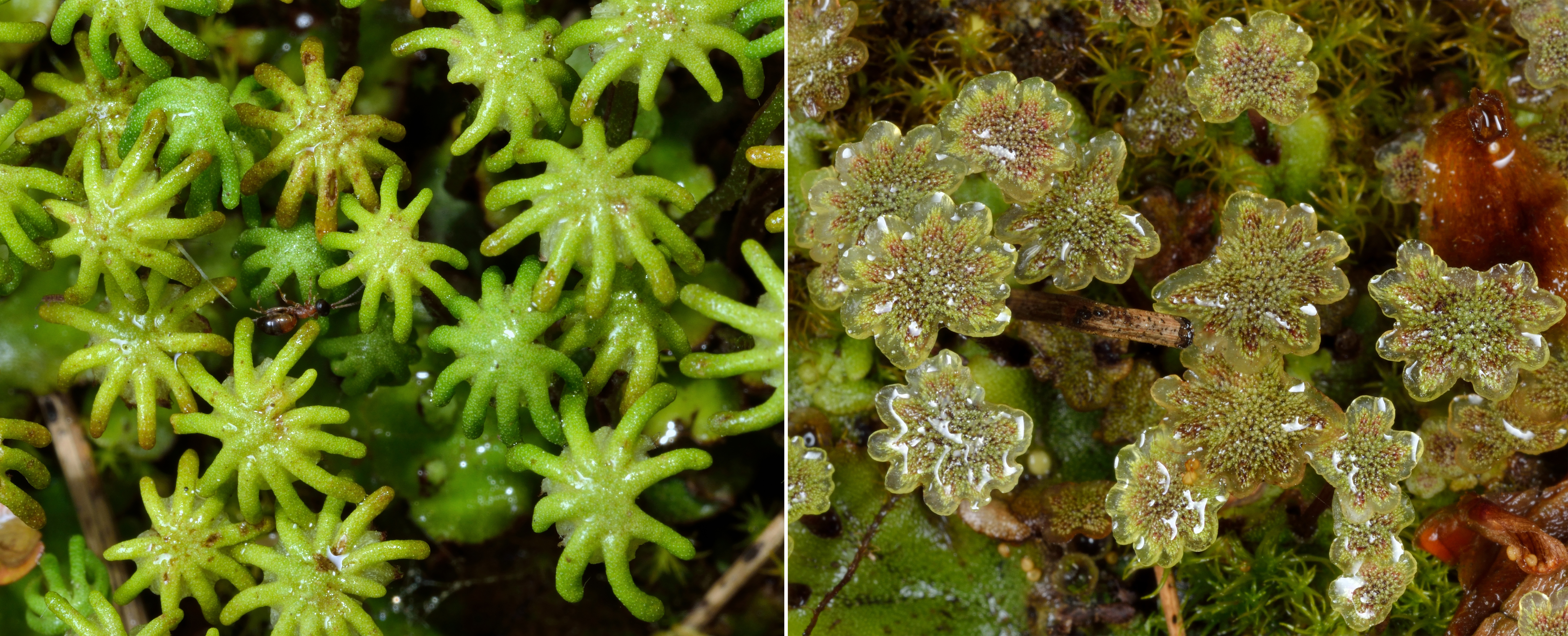
Dioicous gametophytes of the liverwort Marchantia polymorpha. In this species, gametes are produced on different plants on umbrella-shaped gametophores with different morphologies. The radiating arms of female gametophores (left) protect archegonia that produce eggs. Male gametophores (right) are topped with antheridia that produce sperm.

Plants have complex lifecycles involving an alternation of generations. One generation, the sporophyte, produces spores which then grow to become the next generation, the gametophyte. These produce gametes, the eggs and sperm, which then unite and grow to become sporophytes, completing the cycle.

Spores may be identical (isospores) or come in different sizes (microspores and megaspores), but strictly speaking, spores and sporophytes are neither male nor female because they do not produce gametes. The alternate generation, gametophytes, can be monoicous (bisexual), where an individual can produce both eggs and sperm, or dioicous (unisexual), where one produces only eggs and another produces only sperm.

In the bryophytes (liverworts, mosses, and hornworts), the sexual gametophyte is the dominant generation. In ferns and seed plants (including cycads, conifers, flowering plants, etc.) the sporophyte is the dominant generation; the obvious visible plant, whether a small herb or a large tree, and the gametophyte is very small. In bryophytes and ferns, the gametophytes are independent, free-living plants, while in seed plants, each female megagametophyte, and the megaspore that gives rise to it, is hidden within the sporophyte and is entirely dependent on it for nutrition. Each male gametophyte typically consists of two to four cells enclosed within the protective wall of a pollen grain.

The sporophyte of flowering plants is often described using sexual terms (e.g. "female" or "male") based on the sexuality of the gametophyte it produces. For example, a sporophyte that give rise only to male gametophytes may be described as "male", even though the sporophyte itself is asexual, producing only spores. Similarly, flowers produced by the sporophyte may be described as "unisexual" or "bisexual", meaning that they give rise to either one sex of gametophyte or gametophytes of both sexes.

== Flowering plants ==
=== Basic flower morphology ===
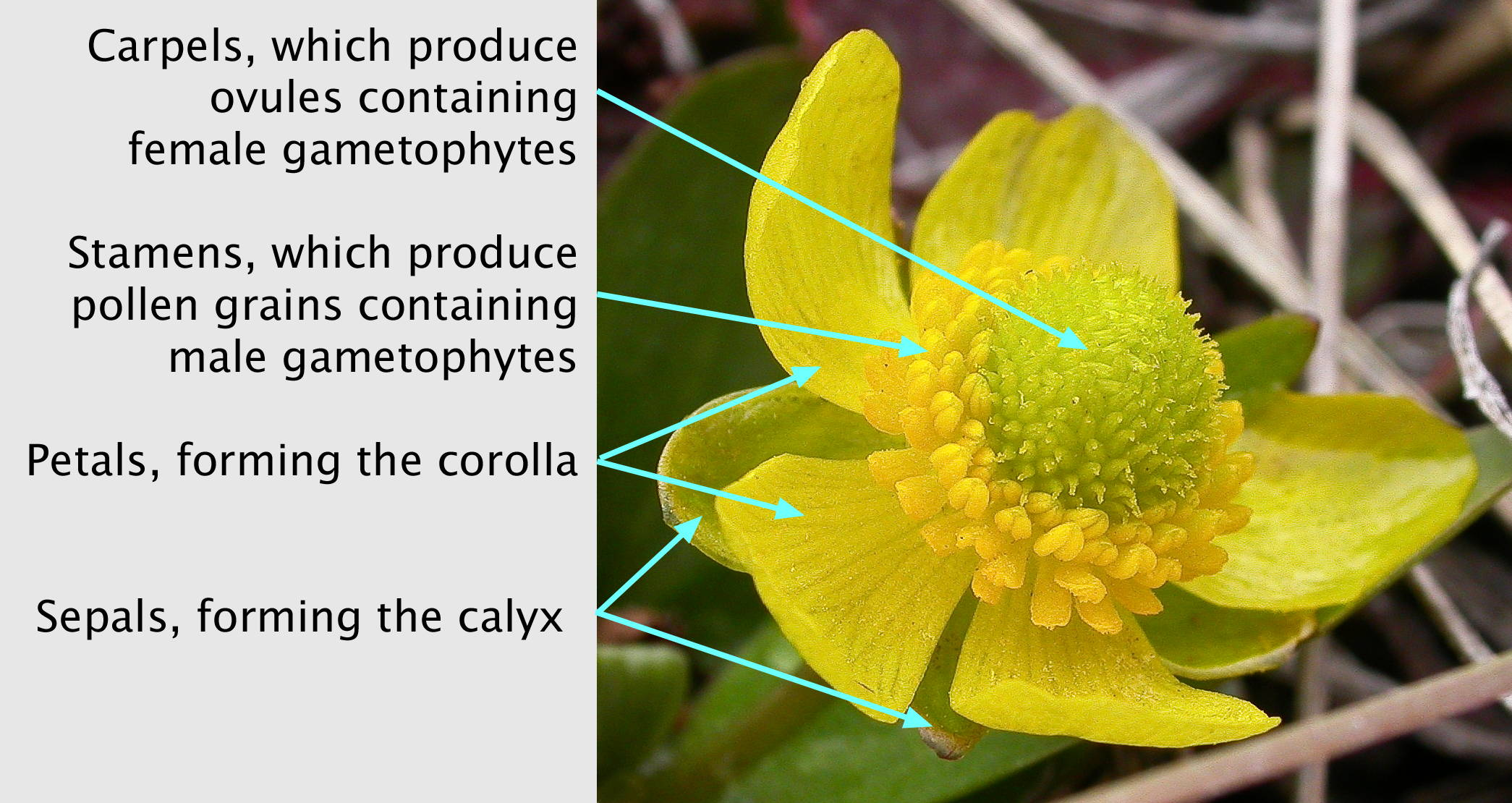
Ranunculus glaberrimus flower

In angiosperms the flower is the characteristic sexual reproductive structure, which varies enormously across the group. The bisexual flower (termed "perfect" botanically), of Ranunculus glaberrimus in the figure provides an example of the common structures. A calyx of outer sepals and a corolla of inner petals form the perianth, the non-sexual part of the flower. Next inwards grow numerous stamens that produce pollen grains, each grain producing a tiny male gametophyte from a microspore. Stamens collectively form the androecium. Finally in the middle there are carpels, which at maturity contain one or more ovules, and within each ovule is a tiny female gametophyte produced from a megaspore. Carpels also have a stigma which receives pollen and a style which connects the stigma to the ovary and enables the pollen to grow into the ovary for the female gametophyte to achieve fertilization. Carpels collectively form the gynoecium.

In other flowering plants, two or more carpels and their styles and stigmas may be fused together to varying degrees in the same flower. This entire structure may be called a pistil.

=== Variations ===
The basic cases of sexuality in flowering plants.

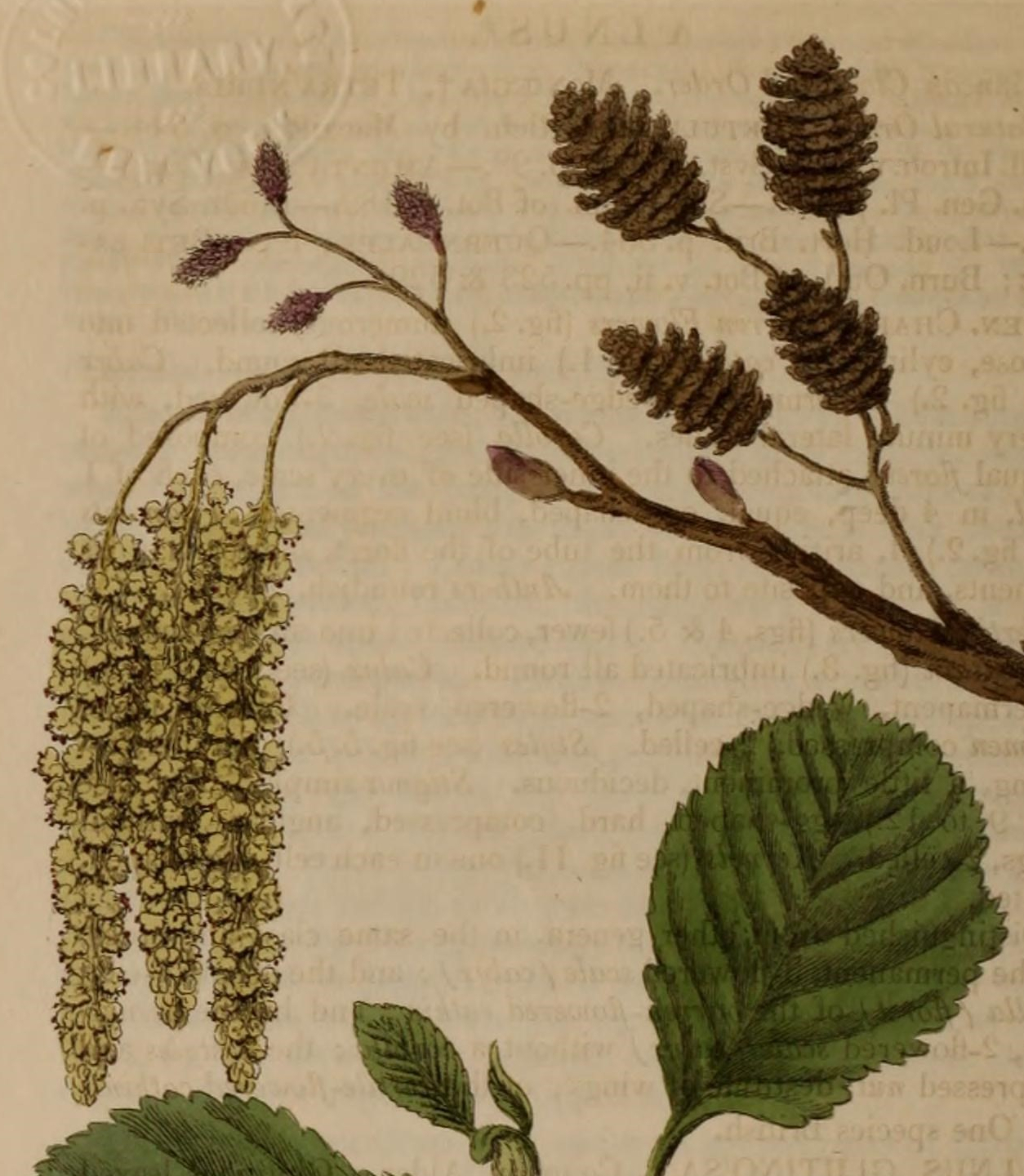
Alnus glutinosa, the common or European alder, has unisexual flowers and is monoecious. The male-flower catkins are hanging down on the left, the much smaller female flowers are above and last season's fruit on the right.

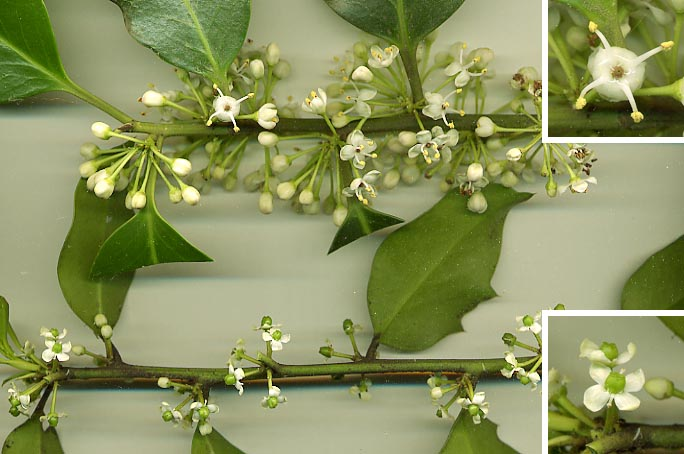
Ilex aquifolium has unisexual flowers and is dioecious: (above and top right) a 'shoot' with flowers from a male plant, showing robust stamens with pollen, and a female-flower stigma, reduced and sterile; and (below and bottom right) a shoot with flowers from a female plant, showing a robust stigma and male-flower stamens (staminodes), reduced, sterile, with no pollen.

A flower with both functional stamens and functional carpels is termed "bisexual" or "hermaphroditic". A flower in which the organs of one sex are missing, undeveloped or sterile is termed "unisexual" – thus flowers with only functional stamens are male or "staminate", and those with only functional carpels are female, "carpellate" or "pistillate".

If only bisexual flowers are found on plants of a species, it is described as homoecious, the most common angiosperm arrangement. If both staminate and carpellate unisexual flowers are always found on the same plant, the species is described as monoecious. If each plant has either only staminate or carpellate flowers, the species is described as dioecious. A 1995 study found that about 6% of angiosperm species are dioecious, and that 7% of genera contain some dioecious species.

Members of the birch family (Betulaceae) are examples of monoecious plants with unisexual flowers. A mature alder tree (Alnus species) produces long catkins containing only male flowers, each with four stamens and a minute perianth, and separate, short catkins of female flowers, each without a perianth. (See the illustration of Alnus glutinosa.)

Most hollies (members of the genus Ilex) are dioecious. Each plant produces either functionally male flowers or functionally female flowers. In Ilex aquifolium (see the illustration), the common European holly, both kinds of flower have four sepals and four white petals; male flowers have four stamens, female flowers usually have four non-functional reduced stamens and a four-celled ovary. Since only female plants are able to set fruit and produce berries, this has consequences for gardeners. Amborella represents the first known group of flowering plants to separate from their common ancestor. It too is dioecious; at any one time, each plant produces either flowers with functional stamens but no carpels, or flowers with a few non-functional stamens and a number of fully functional carpels. However, Amborella plants may change their "sex" over time. In one study, five cuttings from a male plant produced only male flowers when they first flowered, but at their second flowering three switched to producing female flowers.

In extreme cases, almost all of the parts present in a complete flower may be missing, so long as at least one carpel or one stamen is present. This situation is reached in the female flowers of duckweeds (Lemna), which consist of a single carpel, and in the male flowers of spurges (Euphorbia) which consist of a single stamen.

A species such as Fraxinus excelsior, the common ash of Europe, demonstrates one possible kind of variation. Ash flowers are wind-pollinated and lack petals and sepals. Structurally, the flowers may be bisexual, consisting of two stamens and an ovary, or may be male (staminate), lacking a functional ovary, or female (carpellate), lacking functional stamens. Different forms may occur on the same tree, or on different trees. The Asteraceae (sunflower family), with close to 22,000 species worldwide, have highly modified inflorescences made up of flowers (florets) collected together into tightly packed heads. Heads may have florets of one sexual morphology – all bisexual, all carpellate or all staminate (when they are called homogamous), or may have mixtures of two or more sexual forms (heterogamous). Thus goatsbeards (Tragopogon species) have heads of bisexual florets, like other members of the tribe Cichorieae, whereas marigolds (Calendula species) generally have heads with the outer florets bisexual and the inner florets staminate (male).

Like Amborella, some plants undergo sex-switching. For example, Arisaema triphyllum (Jack-in-the-pulpit) expresses sexual differences at different stages of growth: smaller plants produce all or mostly male flowers; as plants grow larger over the years the male flowers are replaced by more female flowers on the same plant. Arisaema triphyllum thus covers a multitude of sexual conditions in its lifetime: nonsexual juvenile plants, young plants that are all male, larger plants with a mix of both male and female flowers, and large plants that have mostly female flowers. Other plant populations have plants that produce more male flowers early in the year and as plants bloom later in the growing season they produce more female flowers.

=== Terminology ===
Visual reference for the terms which end in -oceious/-oecy.

The complexity of the morphology of flowers and its variation within populations has led to a rich terminology.

- Androdioecious: having male flowers on some plants, bisexual ones on others.
- Androecious: having only male flowers (the male of a dioecious population); producing pollen but no seed.
- Androgynous: see bisexual.
- Androgynomonoecious: having male, female, and bisexual flowers on the same plant, also called trimonoecious.
- Andromonoecious: having both bisexual and male flowers on the same plant.
- Bisexual: each flower of each individual has both male and female structures, i.e. it combines both sexes in one structure. Flowers of this kind are called perfect, having both stamens and carpels. Other terms used for this condition are androgynous, hermaphroditic, monoclinous and synoecious.
- Dichogamous: having sexes developing at different times; producing pollen when the stigmas are not receptive, either protandrous or protogynous. This promotes outcrossing by limiting self-pollination. Some dichogamous plants have bisexual flowers, others have unisexual flowers.
- Diclinous: see Unisexual.
- Dioecious: having either only male or only female flowers. No individual plant of the population produces both pollen and ovules. (From the Greek for "two households". See also the Wiktionary entry for dioecious.)
- Gynodioecious: having hermaphrodite flowers and female flowers on separate plants.
- Gynoecious: having only female flowers (the female of a dioecious population); producing seed but not pollen.
- Gynomonoecious: having both bisexual and female flowers on the same plant.
- Hermaphroditic: see bisexual.
- Homoecious: plant species that only has bisexual/hermaproditic flowers.
- Homogamous: male and female sexes reach maturity in synchrony; producing mature pollens when stigma is receptive.
- Imperfect: (of flowers) having some parts that are normally present not developed, e.g. lacking stamens. See also Unisexual.
- Monoclinous: see bisexual.
- Monoecious: In the commoner narrow sense of the term, it refers to plants with unisexual flowers which occur on the same individual. In the broad sense of the term, it also includes plants with bisexual flowers. Individuals bearing separate flowers of both sexes at the same time are called simultaneously or synchronously monoecious and individuals that bear flowers of one sex at one time are called consecutively monoecious. (From the Greek monos "single" + oikia "house". See also the Wiktionary entry for monoecious.)
- Perfect: (of flowers) see bisexual.
- Polygamodioecious: mostly dioecious, but with either a few flowers of the opposite sex or a few bisexual flowers on the same plant.
- Polygamomonoecious: see polygamous. Or, mostly monoecious, but also partly polygamous.
- Polygamous: having male, female, and bisexual flowers on the same plant. Also called polygamomonoecious or trimonoecious. Or, with bisexual and at least one of male and female flowers on the same plant.
- Protandrous: (of dichogamous plants) having male parts of flowers developed before female parts, e.g. having flowers that function first as male and then change to female or producing pollen before the stigmas of the same plant are receptive. (Protoandrous is also used.)
- Protogynous: (of dichogamous plants) having female parts of flowers developed before male parts, e.g. having flowers that function first as female and then change to male or producing pollen after the stigmas of the same plant are receptive.
- Subandroecious: having mostly male flowers, with a few female or bisexual flowers.
- Subdioecious: having some individuals in otherwise dioecious populations with flowers that are not clearly male or female. The population produces normally male or female plants with unisexual flowers, but some plants may have bisexual flowers, some both male and female flowers, and others some combination thereof, such as female and bisexual flowers. The condition is thought to represent a transition between bisexuality and dioecy.
- Subgynoecious: having mostly female flowers, with a few male or bisexual flowers.
- Synoecious: see bisexual.
- Trimonoecious: see polygamous and androgynomonoecious.
- Trioecious: with male, female and bisexual flowers on different plants.
- Unisexual: having either functionally male or functionally female flowers. This condition is also called diclinous, incomplete or imperfect.

=== Outcrossing ===
Outcrossing, cross-fertilization or allogamy, in which offspring are formed by the fusion of the gametes of two different plants, is the most common mode of reproduction among higher plants. About 55% of higher plant species reproduce in this way. An additional 7% are partially cross-fertilizing and partially self-fertilizing (autogamy). About 15% produce gametes but are principally self-fertilizing with significant out-crossing lacking. Only about 8% of higher plant species reproduce exclusively by non-sexual means. These include plants that reproduce vegetatively by runners or bulbils, or which produce seeds without embryo fertilization (apomixis). The selective advantage of outcrossing appears to be the masking of deleterious recessive mutations.

The primary mechanism used by flowering plants to ensure outcrossing involves a genetic mechanism known as self-incompatibility. Various aspects of floral morphology promote allogamy. In plants with bisexual flowers, the anthers and carpels may mature at different times, plants being protandrous (with the anthers maturing first) or protogynous (with the carpels mature first). Monoecious species, with unisexual flowers on the same plant, may produce male and female flowers at different times.

Dioecy, the condition of having unisexual flowers on different plants, necessarily results in outcrossing, and probably evolved for this purpose. However, "dioecy has proven difficult to explain simply as an outbreeding mechanism in plants that lack self-incompatibility". Resource-allocation constraints may be important in the evolution of dioecy, for example, with wind-pollination, separate male flowers arranged in a catkin that vibrates in the wind may provide better pollen dispersal. In climbing plants, rapid upward growth may be essential, and resource allocation to fruit production may be incompatible with rapid growth, thus giving an advantage to delayed production of female flowers. Dioecy has evolved separately in many different lineages, and monoecy in the plant lineage correlates with the evolution of dioecy, suggesting that dioecy can evolve more readily from plants that already produce separate male and female flowers.

== See also ==
- Apomixis
- Vegetative reproduction
- Botany
- Evolution of sexual reproduction
- Flower
- Evolutionary history of plants: Flowers
- Flower: Development
- Meiosis

== Sources ==
- Cook, J. Gordon (1968). ABC of plant terms. Watford, UK: Merrow. OCLC 474319451.
- Sporne, K.R. (1974). The Morphology of Angiosperms. London: Hutchinson. ISBN 978-0-09-120611-6.
- Stace, Clive (2010). New Flora of the British Isles (3rd ed.). Cambridge, UK: Cambridge University Press. ISBN 978-0-521-70772-5.
