= Silene saxifraga =

Scientific classification
- Kingdom: Plantae
- Clade: Tracheophytes
- Clade: Angiosperms
- Clade: Eudicots
- Order: Caryophyllales
- Family: Caryophyllaceae
- Genus: Silene
- Species: S. saxifraga

Binomial name
- Silene saxifraga L.

Species of plant

Silene saxifraga is a species of plant native to southern parts of continental Europe.

== Description ==
The sexual system of the species has been assigned as gynodioecy and gynomonoecy.

== Habitat and distribution ==
The plant mainly grows in a temperate biome. The species is native to countries of France, Spain, Italy, Switzerland, Austria, Albania, Greece, Bulgaria, Romania, and parts of the former Yugoslavia, and it has been introduced to Germany.
