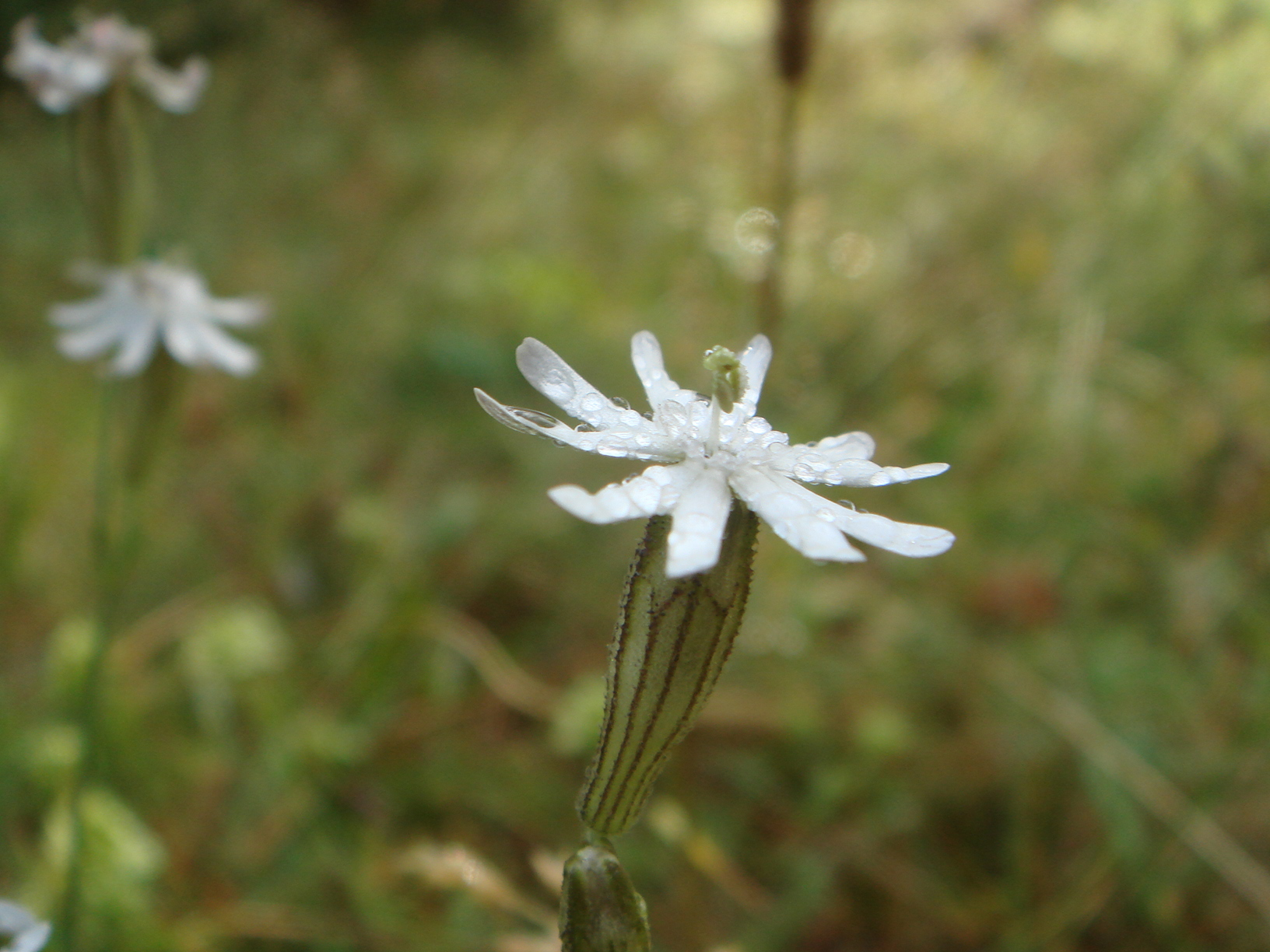

Scientific classification
- Kingdom: Plantae
- Clade: Tracheophytes
- Clade: Angiosperms
- Clade: Eudicots
- Order: Caryophyllales
- Family: Caryophyllaceae
- Genus: Silene
- Species: S. italica

Binomial name
- Silene italica (L.) Pers.

Synonyms
- Cucubalus italicus; Viscago italica

= Silene italica =

Species of plant

Silene italica is a species of plant native to Southern Europe and parts of Asia. It is also introduced to parts of the United States and Northern Europe.

Silene italica is similar to Silene nutans and contains various subspecies.

== Common names ==
In English, it goes by the common name Italian catchfly. While in Denmark it is called Italiensk limurt and in Germany it is called Italienisches Leimkraut.

== Etymology ==
Silene is the feminine form of Silenus, an Ancient Greek woodland deity who was the companion and tutor to the wine god Dionysus.

Italica is the feminine form of Italicus, meaning "of Italy"

== Subspecies ==
The following is a list of subspecies for S. Italica.

- Silene italica subsp. italica
- Silene italica subsp. peloponnesiaca
- Silene italica subsp. sicula
- Silene italica subsp. coutinhoi
- Silene italica subsp. nemoralis
- Silene italica subsp. puberula

== Characteristics ==
It can grow up to 40 cm or 80 cm high and the stems are erect. The species has kidney-shaped seeds. The petals on the flowers can be pink, white, or yellow.

=== Sexual system ===
It is gynodioecious–gynomonoecious and has a low frequency of female plants. Gynomonoecious individuals are common in the species and make up to 40% of the population.

=== Floral scent ===
A study from 2002 found that both terpenoids and benzenoids were dominating over the floral scent of S. Italica. The study also found that chemical composition of S. Italica's floral scent is

- 2.2% benzyl alcohol
- 9% benzyl acetate
- 14.5% linalool
- 9% methylbenzoate

== Distribution and habitat ==
Plants of the World Online says is native to places like Albania, Bulgaria, Cyprus, Italy, Spain, Iran, Italy, Greece, Turkey, Ukraine, Yugoslavia, Palestine, Turkmenistan, Romania, and France and that it is present in Corsica, Denmark, Great Britain, and Germany but not native.

But the Centre for Agriculture and Bioscience International says that it was introduced to Belgium with it first being reported in 1918 and is also present in Austria and Slovakia.

According to the United States Department of Agriculture, it was introduced to New Jersey and New York.

Throughout the Mediterranean region, S. Italica occurs in hedges as well as open woodlands. In southern France it is commonly found in the garrigue.

In Britain, it naturally occurs on chalky roadside banks and chalk quarries between Dartford and Greenhithe. It was first cultivated on the island in 1759 but was first found in the wild in 1863.
