= Gynodioecy =

Coexistence of female and hermaphrodite within a population

Illustrates gynodioecy: when a plant species has a mix of all-female (pink) and all-androgynous (purple) individuals.

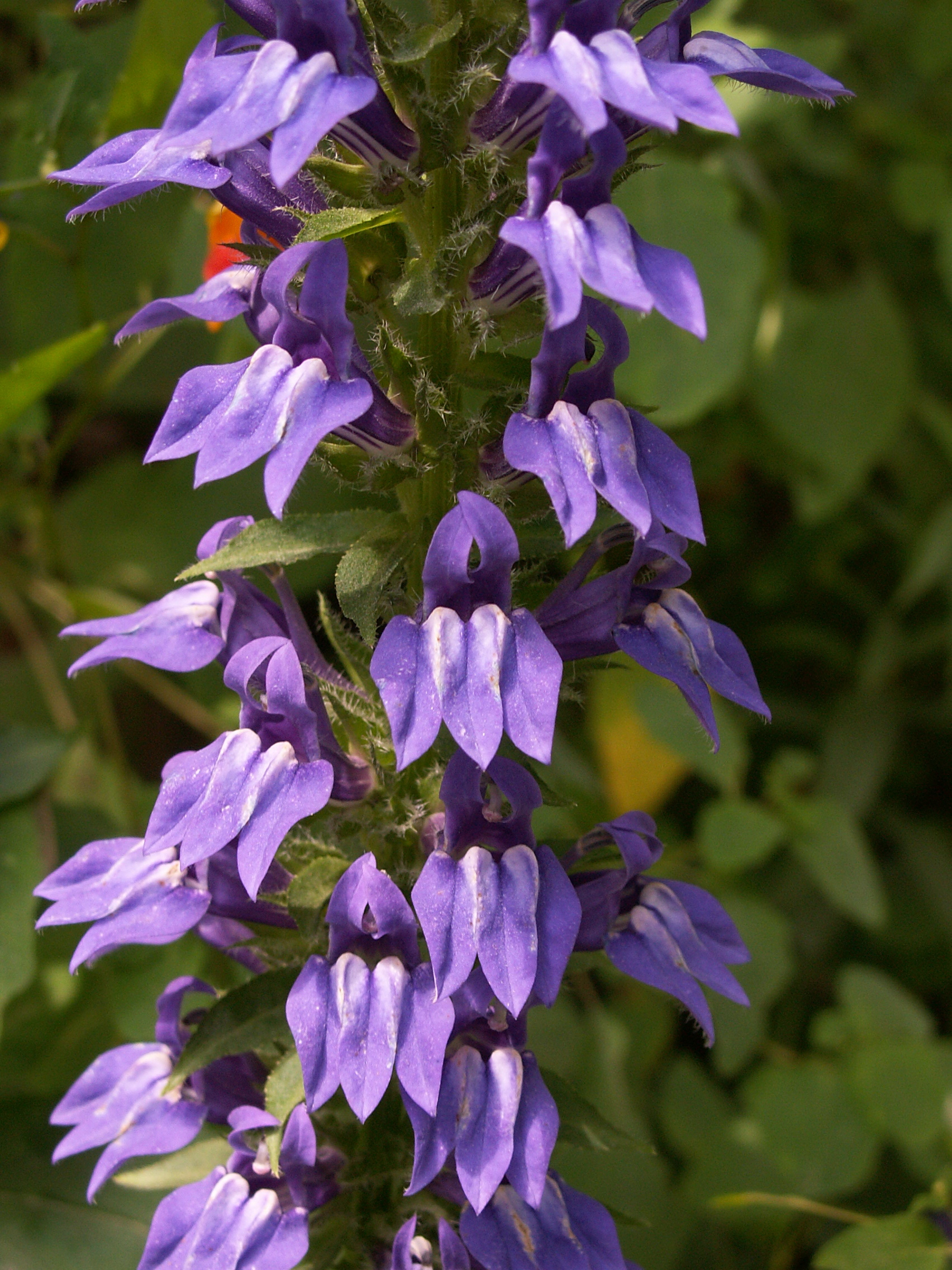
Lobelia siphilitica is an example of a species with a gynodioecious mating system.

Gynodioecy is a rare breeding system that is found in certain flowering plant species in which female and hermaphroditic plants coexist within a population. Gynodioecy is the evolutionary intermediate between hermaphroditism (exhibiting both female and male parts) and dioecy (having two distinct morphs: male and female).

Gynodioecy is sometimes considered a mixed mating system comparable with trioecy and androdioecy. It is also considered a dimorphic sexual system alongside dioecy and androdioecy.

Gynodioecy occurs as a result of transmission of nuclear (nuclear male sterility) or, more commonly, extra-nuclear (e.g. cytoplasmic male sterility) mutated alleles, which prevents pollen production, while keeping the female reproductive parts intact; other members of the species population do not inherit the mutated alleles, thus remaining hermaphrodites. In some cases, a combination of both nuclear and extra-nuclear mechanisms is observed in determining the sterile phenotype. Gynodioecy is extremely rare, with fewer than 1% of angiosperm species exhibiting the breeding system. Some notable taxa that exhibit a gynodioecious mating system include Beta vulgaris (wild beet), Lobelia siphilitica, Silene, and Lamiaceae.

== Etymology ==
The word gynodioecy comes from Greek; gyne (woman), di- (twice or double), and oikos (house). The term was first used by Charles Darwin in 1877 when writing about plant morphology.

== Evolution ==
Gynodioecy is often referred to as the evolutionary intermediate state between hermaphroditism and dioecy, however there is no evidence it is an intermediate state in animals. Gynodioecy has been investigated by biologists dating as far back as to Charles Darwin.

Gynodioecy can evolve from hermaphroditism due to certain environmental factors. If enough resources in a population are allocated to the female functions in a hermaphroditic species, gynodioecy will ensue. On the other hand, if more of those resources favor a hermaphrodite's male functions, androdioecy will result. A high rate of self-pollination in a population facilitates the maintenance of gynodioecy by increasing the inbreeding costs for hermaphrodites. Thus, as the rate of inbreeding increases in a population, the more likely gynodioecy is to occur.

Hermaphroditic plants may be able to reproduce on their own but in many species they are self-incompatible. Research has shown that a species can be either gynodioecious or self-incompatible, but very rarely is there a co-occurrence between the two. Therefore, gynodioecy and self-incompatibility tend to prevent each other's maintenance. Self-incompatibility of plants helps maintain androdioecy in plants, since males are in competition with only hermaphrodites to fertilize ovules. Self-incompatibility leads to a loss in gynodioecy, since neither hermaphrodites nor females have to deal with inbreeding depression.

Two scenarios have been proposed to explain the evolutionary dynamics of the maintenance of gynodioecy. The first scenario, known as the balancing selection theory, considers the genetic factors that control gynodioecy over long evolutionary time scales. The balancing selection leads to cycles that explain the normal sex ratios in gynodioecious populations. The second scenario, known as epidemic dynamics, involves the arrival and loss of new cytoplasmic male sterility genes in new populations. These are the same genes that invade hermaphrodite populations and eventually result in gynodioecy.

== Mechanism ==
Gynodioecy is determined as a result of a genetic mutation that stops a plant from producing pollen, but still allows normal female reproductive features. In plants, nuclear genes are inherited from both parents, but all the cytoplasmic genes come from the mother. This allows male gametes to be smaller and more motile while female gametes are larger. It makes sense for most plants to be hermaphrodites, since they are sessile and unable to find mates as easily as animals can.

Cytoplasmic male sterility genes, usually found in the mitochondrial genome, show up and are established when female fertility is just slightly more than the hermaphroditic fertility. The female only needs to make slightly more or better seeds than hermaphrodites since the mitochondrial genome is maternally inherited. Research done on plants has shown that hermaphroditic plants are in constant battles against organelle genes trying to kill their male parts. In over 140 plant species, these “male killer” genes have been observed. Male sterility genes cause plants to grow anthers that are stunted or withered and as a result, do not produce pollen. In most plants, there are nuclear fertility restoring genes that counteract the work of the male sterility genes, maintaining the hermaphroditic state of the plant. However, in some species of plants, the male sterility genes win the battle over the nuclear fertility restoring genes, and gynodioecy occurs.

Maize farmers take advantage of gynodioecy to produce favorable hybrid maize seeds. The farmers deliberately make use of the gynodioecy that develops in the maize, resulting in a population of male-sterile and female-fertile individuals. They then introduce a new strain of male-sterile individuals and the breeders are able to collect the more favorable hybrid seeds.

== Species distribution ==
Gynodioecy is a rare, but widely distributed sexual system in angiosperm species. Gynodioecy is found in at least 81 different angiosperm families but less than 1% of the angiosperms species on Earth are gynodioecious. One likely explanation for its rarity is due to its limited evolution. Since females are at a disadvantage when compared with hermaphrodites, they will never be able to evolve as quickly. In addition, gynodioecy is rare because the mechanisms that favor females and cause gynodioecy in some populations only operate in some plant lineages, but not others.

The reason for this variation in the rarity of gynodioecy stems from certain phenotypic traits or ecological factors that promote and favor the presence of female plants in a population. For example, a herbaceous growth form is much more highly favored in gynodioecious species of Lamiaceae when compared with woody lineages. Herbaceous growth form is also associated with a reduced pollen limitation and increased self-fertilization. A reduced pollen limitation may decrease seed quantity and quality. Woody growth form Lamiaceae are more pollen-limited and thus produce fewer seeds and seeds of lower quality, thus favoring the female herbaceous growth form. Gynodioecy is rare because some sexual systems are more evolutionarily liable to change in certain lineages in comparison with others.

It has been estimated that gynodioecy occurs in 13.3% of Silene species.

== Maintenance ==
Theoretically, hermaphrodites should have the evolutionary and reproductive advantage over females in a population because they naturally can produce more offspring. Hermaphrodites can transmit their genes through both pollen and ovules, whereas females can only transmit genes via ovules. Thus, in order for females to remain viable in a population, they would have to be twice as successful as hermaphrodites.

It would appear that gynodioecy should not persist. In order for it to be maintained, the females need to have some sort of a reproductive advantage over the hermaphroditic population, known as female compensation or female advantage. Female advantage includes an increase in saved energy from not producing pollen and making seedlings of higher quality, since hermaphrodite seedlings are susceptible to homozygous deleterious alleles. Additional advantages include more flowers, higher fruit set, higher total seed production, heavier seeds, and better germination rates.

=== Inbreeding depression ===
Inbreeding depression was found to be an important factor in the maintenance of gynodioecy in an endemic Hawaiian shrub Schiedea adamantis occurring in a single population in Diamond Head Crater Oahu. Inbreeding depression, due to selfing in the hermaphrodites, was considered to be caused by the presence of many mutations of small effect.

== Examples ==
The following species and higher taxa have been observed to exhibit a gynodioecious breeding system:

- Fuchsia excorticata
- Lobelia siphilitica
- Silene
- Beta vulgaris
- Lamiaceae
- Fragaria virginiana
- Cucurbita foetidissima
- Wild thyme
- Daphne jezoensis
- Silene vulgaris
- Silene nutans
- Plantains
- Reynoutria japonica
- Erythranthe guttata

== See also ==
  - Monoecy
  - Dioecy
  - Trioecy
  - Androdioecy
  - Hermaphrodite
  - Monoicy
  - Dioicy
