= Maireana prosthecochaeta =

Scientific classification
- Kingdom: Plantae
- Clade: Tracheophytes
- Clade: Angiosperms
- Clade: Eudicots
- Order: Caryophyllales
- Family: Amaranthaceae
- Genus: Maireana
- Species: M. prosthecochaeta

Binomial name
- Maireana prosthecochaeta (F.Muell.) Paul G.Wilson

Synonyms
- Kochia prosthecochaeta F.Muell.

Species of plant in the amaranth family

Maireana prosthecochaeta is a species of flowering plant in the family Amaranthaceae, and is endemic to the north-west of Western Australia. It is an open, densely-leaved, glabrous shrub with erect branches, almost terete leaves, bisexual flowers arranged singly, and a glabrous, dark brown fruiting perianth with a horizontal wing.

== Description ==
Maireana prosthecochaeta is an open, densely-leaved, glabrous shrub that typically grows to a height of up to 60 cm (24 in), its branches erect, somewhat fleshy, the older portions with prominent leaf bases. Its leaves are arranged alternately, fleshy and almost terete, up to 40 mm (1.6 in) long, 2–3 mm (0.079–0.118 in) wide and bright green. The flowers are bisexual, arranged singly and glabrous, crowded towards the ends of branches. The fruiting perianth is glabrous, dark brown when dry, with a top-shaped tube about 5 mm (0.20 in) high, and a simple wing about 15 mm (0.59 in) in diameter.

== Taxonomy ==
This species was first formally described in 1882 by Ferdinand von Mueller who gave it the name Kochia prosthecochaeta in his Fragmenta Phytographiae Australiae. In 1975, Paul Wilson transferred the species to Maireana as M. prosthecochaeta in the journal Nuytsia. The specific epithet (prosthecochaeta) means 'a long appendage', "probably referring to the needle-shaped processes on the perianth".

== Distribution and habitat ==
This species of bluebush usually grows in laterite on hills and in salty places, from Cue north to the Gascoyne River in the Gascoyne and Murchison bioregions of north-western Western Australia.

== Conservation status ==
Maireana prosthecochaeta is listed as "Priority Three" by the Government of Western Australia, Department of Biodiversity, Conservation and Attractions, meaning that it is poorly known and known from only a few locations but is not under imminent threat.
