= Maireana platycarpa =

Scientific classification
- Kingdom: Plantae
- Clade: Tracheophytes
- Clade: Angiosperms
- Clade: Eudicots
- Order: Caryophyllales
- Family: Amaranthaceae
- Genus: Maireana
- Species: M. platycarpa

Binomial name
- Maireana platycarpa Paul G.Wilson

Species of plant in the amaranth family

Maireana platycarpa, commonly known as shy bluebush, is a species of flowering plant in the family Amaranthaceae, and is endemic to Western Australia. It is a brittle, much-branched shrub with woolly branches, linear to almost terete or boat-shaped leaves, bisexual, woolly flowers arranged singly, and a pale golden fruiting perianth with a thin, woolly horizontal wing.

== Description ==
Maireana platycarpa is a brittle, much-branched shrub that typically grows to a height of 10–60 cm (3.9–23.6 in), its branches covered with woolly hairs. Its leaves are usually arranged in opposite pairs, linear to almost terete or boat-shaped and sessile, 7–12 mm (0.28–0.47 in) long and covered with silky hairs. The flowers are bisexual and arranged singly and densely covered with woolly hairs. The fruiting perianth is flattened, pale gold when dry with a flat or slightly convex tube 4–6 mm (0.16–0.24 in) in diameter, and a flat wing continuous with the tube, usually 15–23 mm (0.59–0.91 in) in diameter, and more or less woolly with a single slit.

== Taxonomy ==
Maireana platycarpa was first formally described in 1975 by Paul G. Wilson in the journal Nuytsia from specimens he collected 80 km (50 mi) north of Laverton in 1968. The specific epithet (platycarpa) means 'wide-fruited'.

== Distribution and habitat ==
Shy bluebush usually grows in saline areas but also on the rocky slopes of hills, and is widespread in the Avon Wheatbelt, Carnarvon, Coolgardie, Gascoyne, Great Victoria Desert, Murchison, Pilbara and Yalgoo bioregions of Western Australia.

== Conservation status ==
Maireana platycarpa is listed as "not threatened" by the Government of Western Australia Department of Biodiversity, Conservation and Attractions.
