= Trimonoecy =

Sexual system in flowering plants

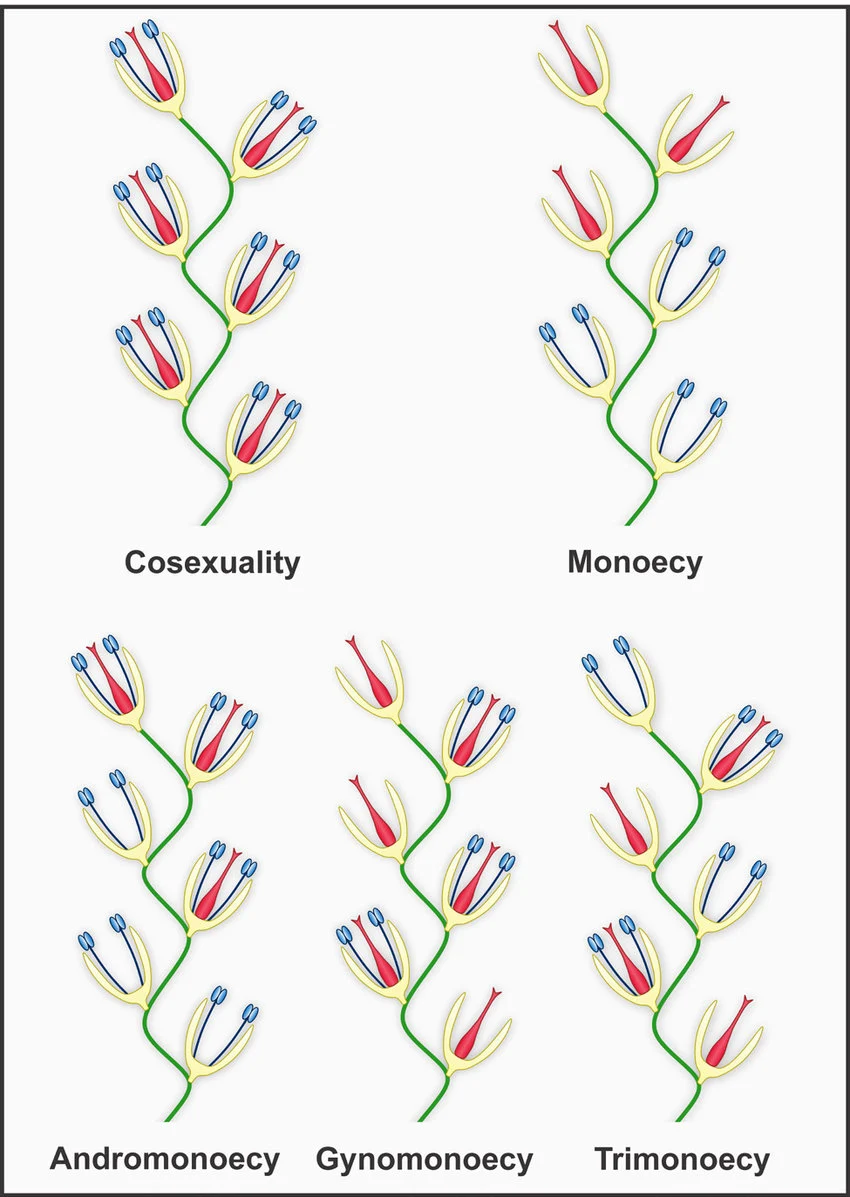
Monomorphic sexual systems in angiosperms.

Trimonoecy, also called polygamomonoecy or androgynomonoecy, is a sexual system in plants in which a single individual produces male, female, and hermaphroditic flowers simultaneously. Trimonoecy is rare, occurring in 0.025% of angiosperm species.

It is a monomorphic sexual system along with monoecy, gynomonoecy, and andromonoecy. It is hypothesized that trimonoecy originated from gynomonoecy.

== Genetic basis ==
Ethylene is a master regulator of sex determination in some diclinous plants, such as the cucurbits. In melon and watermelon, sex forms are controlled by three major genes: G/g (gynoecious), A/a (andromonecious) and M/m (male). Mutations in M, which encodes an ACC synthase (ACS) involved in ethylene biosynthesis, causes female flowers to develop into hermaphrodites and the individual to become trimonoecious. Similarly, mutating ACO1A, another ethylene biosynthesis gene, in Cucurbita pepo also promotes the conversion of female flowers to hermaphroditic flowers while male flowers remain unaffected, resulting in partial andromonoecy or trimonoecy.

== Prevalence ==
Trimonoecy is present in 73 species across 44 genera and 29 families of angiosperms; 6.9% of all angiosperm families, including 20.0% of monocot families, are trimonoecious. 80.3% of all trimonoecious species belong to the Superrosids or Superasterids. No evidence of trimonoecy has been found in basal angiosperms or magnoliids.

=== Species ===
- Cocos nucifera
- Galium rivale
- Jatropha curcas
- Phyllanthus acidus
- Sanguisorba minor
- Thymelaea hirsuta

=== Families ===
- Amaranthaceae
- Anacardiaceae
- Apiaceae
- Araliaceae
- Arecaceae
- Chenopodiaceae
- Cleomaceae
- Commelinaceae
- Cucurbitaceae
- Euphorbiaceae
- Fabaceae
- Orchidaceae
- Palmae
- Phyllanthaceae
- Poaceae
- Rosaceae
- Rubiaceae
- Thymelaeaceae
