= Eupithecia carpophagata =

Scientific classification
- Kingdom: Animalia
- Phylum: Arthropoda
- Clade: Pancrustacea
- Class: Insecta
- Order: Lepidoptera
- Family: Geometridae
- Genus: Eupithecia
- Species: E. carpophagata

Binomial name
- Eupithecia carpophagata Staudinger, 1871

Synonyms
- Acidalia cassandrata Milliere, 1874; Tephroclystia benacaria Dannehl, 1933

Species of moth

Eupithecia carpophagata is a moth in the family Geometridae. It is found in the mountains of Europe, including the eastern Pyrenees, the central and southern part of the Alps, the Massif Central, the central Apennines and the Balkan Peninsula.

The wingspan is about 22 mm.

The larvae feed on Silene species, including Silene cordifolia, Silene saxifraga and Silene rupestris. Larvae can be found from the end of June to September. The species overwinters in the pupal stage.

== Subspecies ==
- Eupithecia carpophagata carpophagata
- Eupithecia carpophagata benacaria (Dannehl, 1933)
- Eupithecia carpophagata cassandrata (Milliere, 1874)
