= Simultaneous hermaphroditism =

Type of hermaphroditism

Simultaneous hermaphroditism is one of the two types of hermaphroditism, the other type being sequential hermaphroditism. In this form of hermaphroditism an individual has sex organs of both sexes and can produce both gamete types even in the same breeding season.

The distinction between simultaneous hermaphroditism and sequential hermaphroditism is not always clear. But unlike sequential hermaphrodites, simultaneous hermaphrodites are both male and female at sexual maturity. Also sex determination does not apply to simultaneous hermaphrodites (except in species with mix mating systems). In simultaneous hermaphrodites, self-fertilization is possible in some species, where in others it is absent.

== Evolution ==
The evolution of anisogamy possibly contributed to the evolution of simultaneous hermaphroditism. It is known that simultaneous hermaphroditism that exclusively reproduces through self-fertilization has evolved many times in plants and animals, but it might not last long evolutionarily.

The primary model explaining the evolution of simultaneous hermaphroditism from gonochorism in animals is the low density model. This model explains simultaneous hermaphroditism as a reproductive adaptation to limited mating opportunities. This is advantageous to simultaneous hermaphrodites that can self-fertilize, because they are able to reproduce even if they fail to find a sexual partner. The low density model is helpful for understanding the development of simultaneous hermaphroditism in many animal species. For example, in crustaceans simultaneous hermaphroditism can be found in groups that are sessile or live in environments with limited mating opportunities.

== Plants ==
Most plants are simultaneous hermaphrodites with it occurring in 80% of angiosperms. Angiosperms reproduce by means of sexual reproduction, where the same flower possesses both gametes to produce offspring.

== Animals ==
Simultaneous hermaphroditism is one of the most common sexual systems in animals. The majority of Cocculinoidea, and of earthworms, are simultaneous hermaphrodites and it occurs in over 67% of coral species.
