= Sexual system =

Distribution of male and female functions across a species

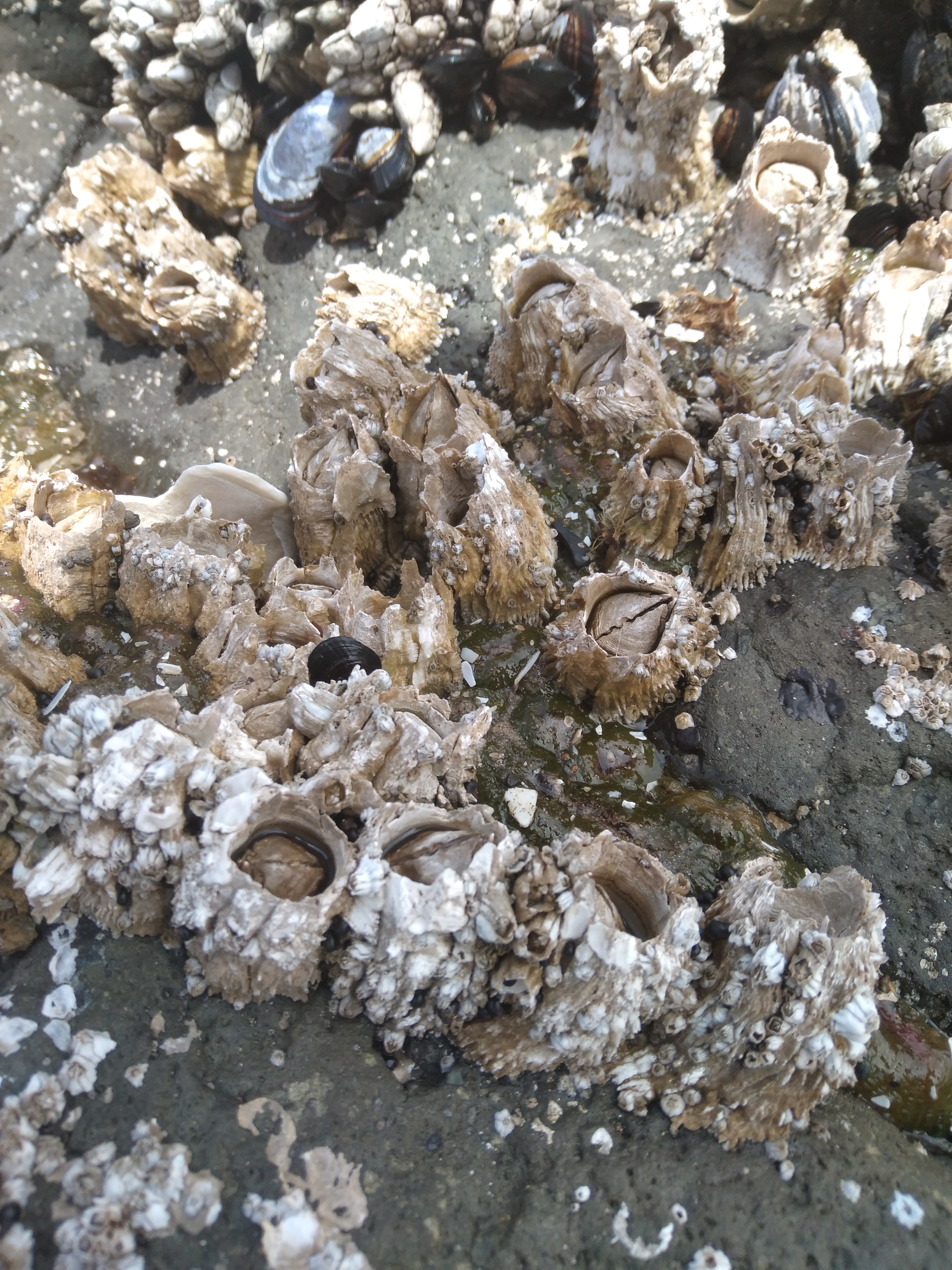
Barnacles have a variety of sexual systems.

A sexual system is a distribution of male and female functions across organisms in a species. The terms reproductive system and mating system have also been used as synonyms.

Sexual systems play a key role in genetic variation and reproductive success, and may also have led to the origin or extinction of certain species. In flowering plants and animals, sexual reproduction involves meiosis, an adaptive process for repairing damage in the germline DNA transmitted to progeny. The distinctions between different sexual systems is not always clear due to phenotypic plasticity.

Interest in sexual systems goes back to Charles Darwin, who found that barnacles include some species that are androdioecious and some that are dioecious.

== Types of sexual systems ==
The life cycle of an angiosperm.

Flowering plants may have dimorphic or monomorphic sexual systems. In monomorphic sexual systems, a combination of hermaphrodite, male, and/or female flowers may be present on the same plant. Monomorphic sexual systems include monoecy, gynomonoecy, andromonoecy, and trimonoecy. In dimorphic sexual systems, individual plants within a species only produce one sort of flower, either hermaphrodite or male, or female. Dimorphic sexual systems include dioecy, gynodioecy, androdioecy, and trioecy.

Male (a.k.a. staminate) flowers have a stamen but no pistil and produce only male gametes. Female (a.k.a. pistillate) flowers only have a pistil. Hermaphrodite (a.k.a. perfect, or bisexual) flowers have both a stamen and pistil. The sex of a single flower may differ from the sex of the whole organism: for example, a plant may have both staminate and pistillate flowers, making the plant as a whole a hermaphrodite. Hence although all monomorphic plants are hermaphrodites, different combinations of flower types (staminate, pistillate, or perfect) produces distinct monomorphic sexual systems.

In animals, androdioecy, gynodioecy, and trioecy are referred to as mixed sexual systems;where hermaphrodites coexist with single sexed individuals.

== List of sexual systems ==
Sexual system	Description
Androdioecy	males and hermaphrodites coexist in a population. It is rare in both plants and animals.
Andromonoecy	rare sexual system in angiosperms, in which a plant has both male and hermaphroditic flowers. It has been a subject of interest regarding the mechanism of sex expression.
Dichogamy	an individual plant produces either exclusively male or exclusively female flowers at different points in time. It is thought the temporal separation of producing male and female flowers occurs to prevent self-fertilization, however this is debatable as dichogamy occurs in similar frequency among species which are self-compatible and self-incompatible.
Dioicy	one of the main sexual systems in bryophytes. In dioicy male and female sex organs are on separate gametophytes.
Dioecy	a species has distinct individual organisms that are either male or female, i.e., they produce only male or only female gametes, either directly (in animals) or indirectly (in plants).
Gonochorism	individuals are either male or female. The term "gonochorism" is usually applied to animals while "dioecy" is applied to plants. Gonochorism is the most common sexual system in animals, occurring in 95% of animal species.
Gynodioecy	females and hermaphrodites coexist in the same population.
Gynomonoecy	defined as the presence of both female and hermaphrodite flowers on the same individual of a plant species. It is prevalent in Asteraceae but is poorly understood.
Gynodioecy-Gynomonoecy	a sexual system for plants when female, hermaphrodite, and gynomonoecious plants coexist in the same population.
Monoicy	one of the main sexual systems in bryophytes. In monoicy male and female sex organs are present in the same gametophyte.
Monoecy	a sexual system in which male and female flowers are present on the same plant. It is common in angiosperms, and occurs in 10% of all plant species.
Sequential hermaphroditism	individuals start their adult lives as one sex, and change to the other sex at a later age.
Sequential monoecy	a confusing sexual system, in which the combination of male, female, and hermaphrodite flowers presented changes over time. For example, some conifers produce exclusively either male or female cones when young, then both when older. Sequential monoecy can be difficult to differentiate from dioecy. Several alternative terms may be used in reference to sexual systems involving temporal changes to sex presentation of a plant species (e.g. dichogamy, sequential hermaphroditism, sex change, paradioecy, diphasy).
Simultaneous hermaphroditism	an individual can produce both gamete types in the same breeding season. Simultaneous hermaphroditism is one of the most common sexual systems in animals (though far less common than gonochorism) and is one of the most stable.
Synoecy	all individuals in a population of flowering plants bear solely hermaphrodite flowers.
Trioecy	males, females, and hermaphrodites exist in the same population. It is present in both plants and animals but is always extremely rare. Trioecy occurs in about 3.6% of flowering plants. Trioecy may infrequently be referred to as tridioecy.
Trimonoecy	(also called androgynomonoecy) is when male, female, and hermaphrodite flowers are present on the same plant. Triomonoecy is rare.
