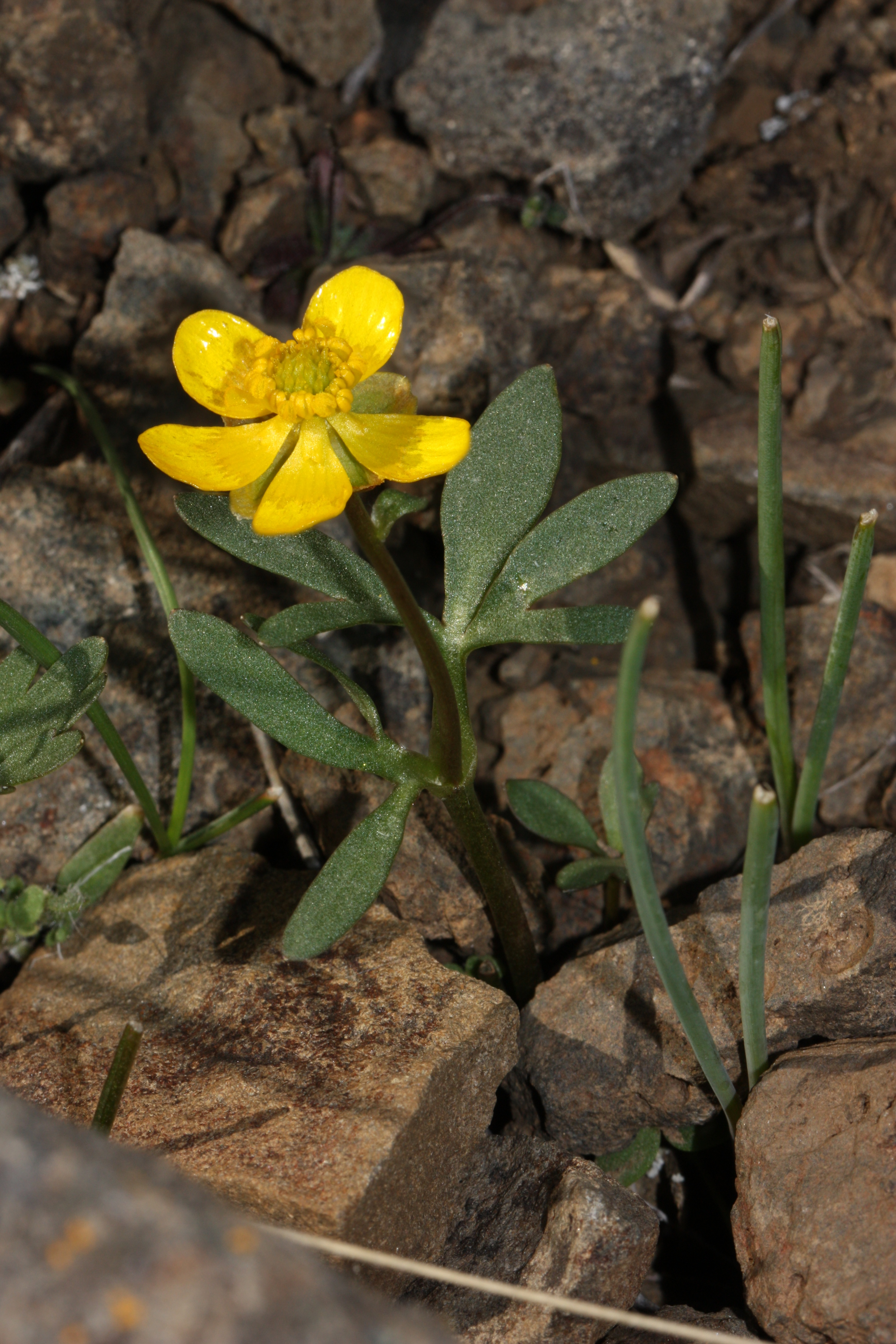

Conservation status
- Secure (NatureServe)

Scientific classification
- Kingdom: Plantae
- Clade: Embryophytes
- Clade: Tracheophytes
- Clade: Angiosperms
- Clade: Eudicots
- Order: Ranunculales
- Family: Ranunculaceae
- Genus: Ranunculus
- Species: R. glaberrimus

Binomial name
- Ranunculus glaberrimus Hook.

= Ranunculus glaberrimus =

Species of flowering plant

Ranunculus glaberrimus, the sagebrush buttercup, is a species of flowering plant in the buttercup family, Ranunculaceae. It is native to interior western North America, in western Canada, the western United States, and the northwestern Great Plains.

== Distribution ==
Ranunculus glaberrimus is found from central British Columbia east to southern Saskatchewan, south through the Dakotas to Kansas, through the Rocky Mountains southeast to northern New Mexico, west to the Great Basin region, and southwest to northeastern California.

It occurs in habitat types with junipers (Juniperus occidentalis), sagebrush (Artemisia tridentata) and bitterbrush (Purshia tridentata), in damp ground.

== Description ==
Ranunculus glaberrimus is a herbaceous perennial plant growing to 4–15 centimetres (1 1/2–6 in) tall. The roots are clustered and fleshy. The somewhat thick basal leaves are oval, with long petioles, ranging from entire to having three deep lobes. Cauline leaves have short petioles but are otherwise similar. The flowers have four to ten yellow petals (usually five) about 1 cm long. The sepals are yellow-purple, and the stamens and pistils are numerous. It flowers relatively early, typically in March and April, though occasionally blooming in February.

The species is reportedly toxic to livestock and possibly to humans as well.

The Fraser River Stl'atl'imx use the annual bloom of sagebrush buttercup as an indicator of the beginning of the chinook salmon run up the Fraser River above Lillooet. This period of time is called "spring salmon eye" because the flowers are the same color as the salmons' eyes.

== Gallery ==
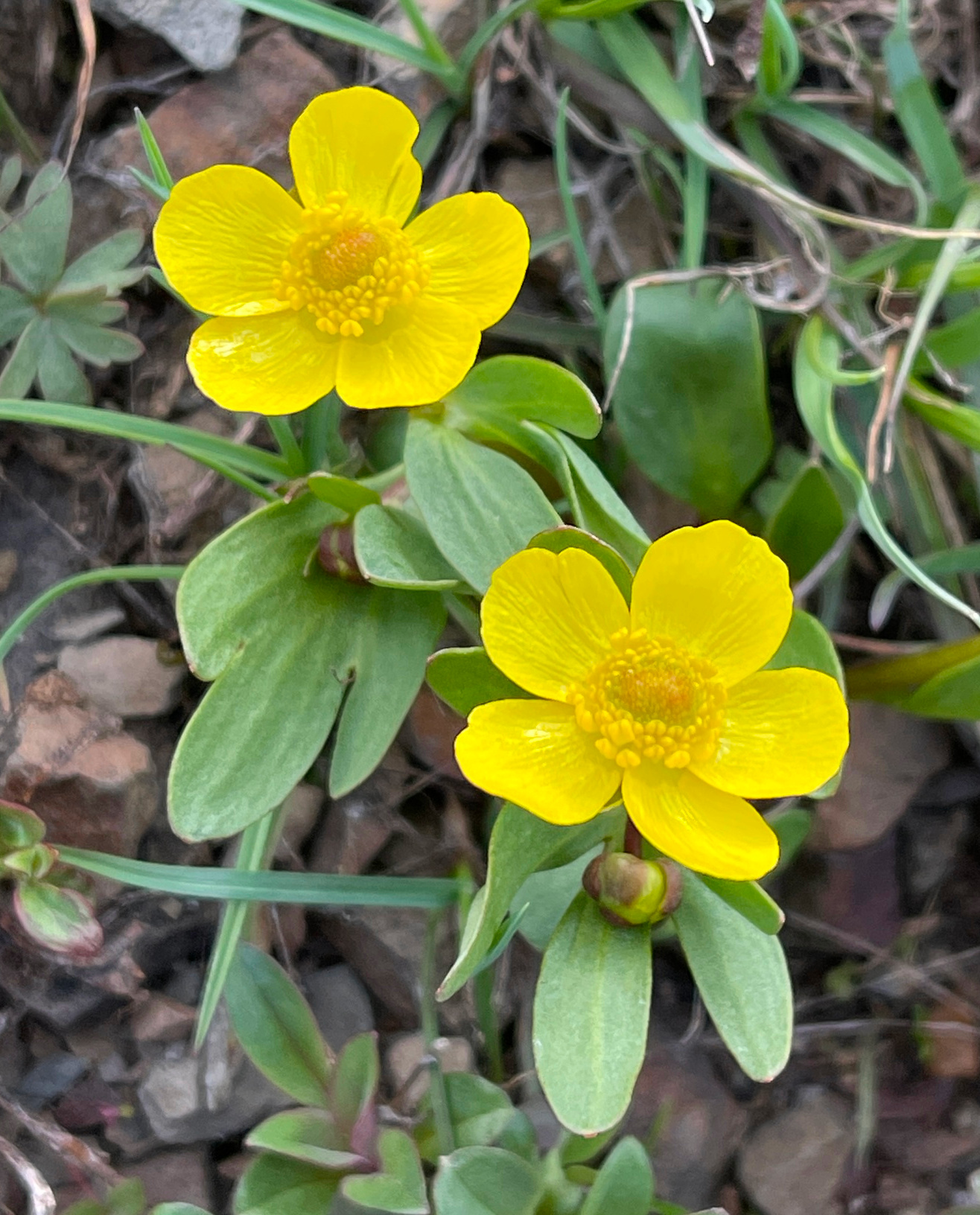
Sagebrush buttercup flower close-up / macro photograph.

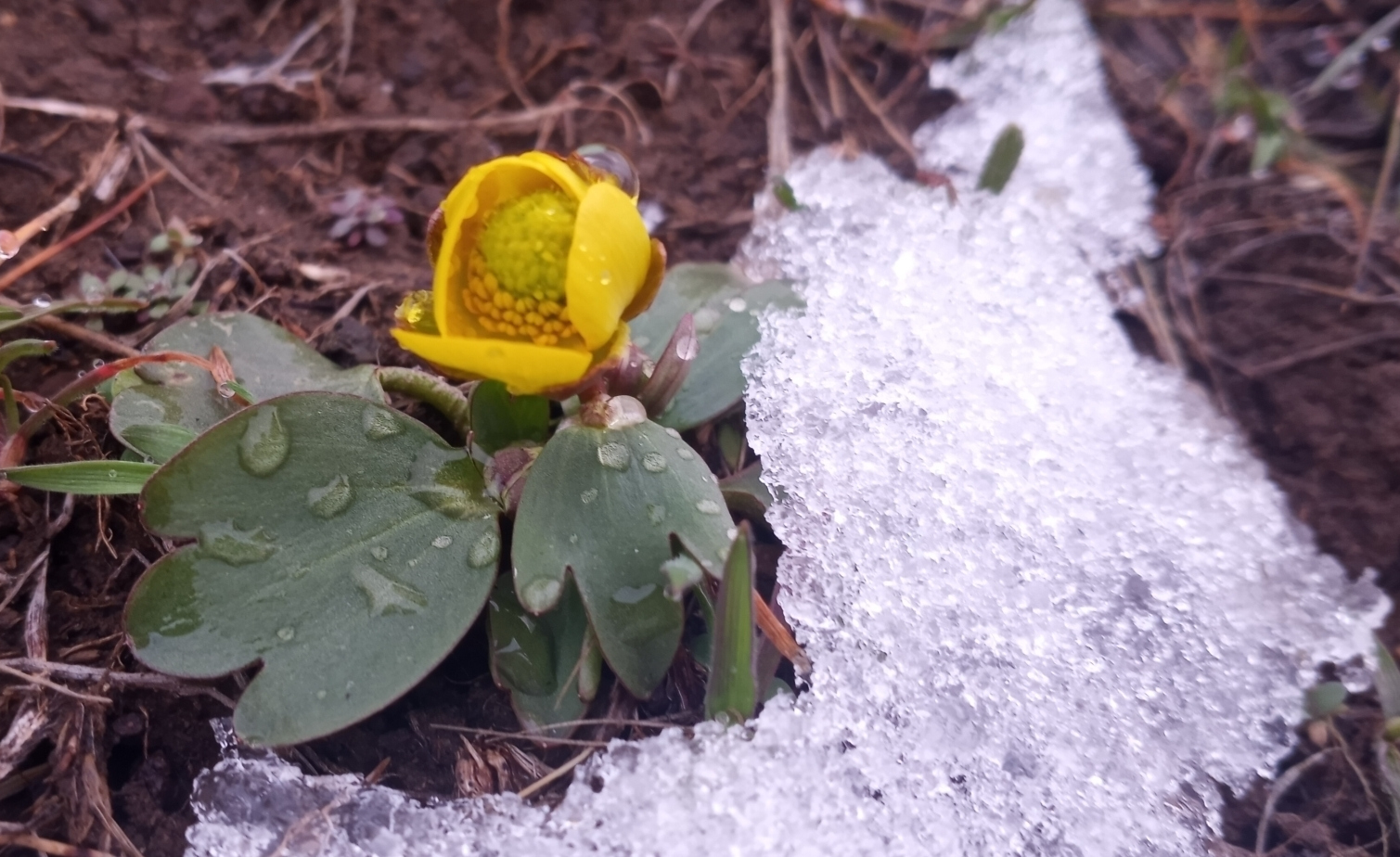
Emerging through snow

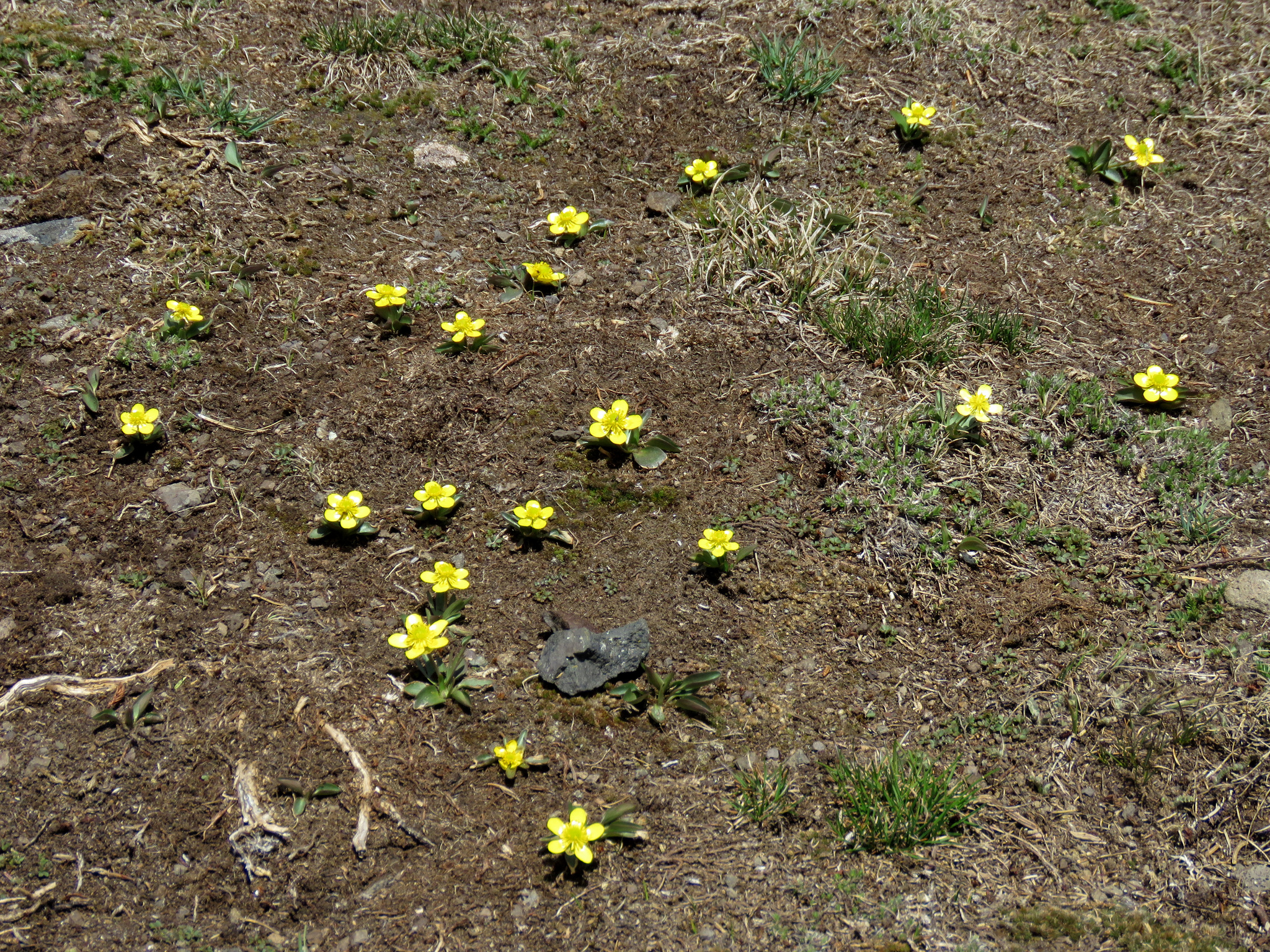
Group of plants on Olympic Peninsula

== See also ==
- Sagebrush steppe
- Great Basin shrub steppe
