= Monoicy =

Sexual system in haploid plants

Monoicy is a sexual system in haploid plants (mainly bryophytes) where both sperm and eggs are produced on the same gametophyte, in contrast with dioicy, where each gametophyte produces only sperm or eggs but never both. Both monoicous and dioicous gametophytes produce gametes in gametangia by mitosis rather than meiosis, so that sperm and eggs are genetically identical with their parent gametophyte.

It has been suggested that monoicy may have benefits in dry habitats where the ability to produce sporophytes is limited due to lack of water.

Monoicy is similar to, and often conflated with, monoecy, which applies to seed plants (spermatophytes) and refers to separate male and female cones or flowers on the same plant.

== Etymology and history ==
The word monoicous and the related forms mon(o)ecious are derived from the Greek mόνος (mónos), single, and οἶκος (oîkos) or οἰκία (oikía), house. The words dioicous and di(o)ecious are derived from οἶκος or οἰκία and δι- (di-), twice, double. ((o)e is the Latin way of transliterating Greek οι, whereas oi is a more straightforward modern way.) Generally, the terms "monoicous" and "dioicous" have been restricted to description of haploid sexuality (gametophytic sexuality), and are thus used primarily to describe bryophytes in which the gametophyte is the dominant generation. Meanwhile, "monoecious" and "dioecious" are used to describe diploid sexuality (sporophytic sexuality), and thus are used to describe tracheophytes (vascular plants) in which the sporophyte is the dominant generation. However, this usage, although precise, is not universal, and "monoecious" and "dioecious" are still used by some bryologists for the gametophyte.

== Occurrence ==
40% of mosses are monoicious.

== Bryophyte sexuality ==
Bryophytes have life cycles that are gametophyte dominated. The longer lived, more prominent autotrophic plant is the gametophyte. The sporophyte in mosses and liverworts consists of an unbranched stalk (a seta) bearing a single sporangium or spore-producing capsule. Even when capable of photosynthesis, as in mosses and hornworts, bryophyte sporophytes require additional photosynthate from the gametophyte to sustain growth and spore development and are dependent on the gametophyte for their supplies of water, mineral nutrients and nitrogen.

Antheridia and archegonia are often clustered. A cluster of antheridia is called an androecium while a cluster of archegonia is called a gynoecium. (Note these terms have a different meaning when used to refer to flower structures.)

Bryophytes have the most elaborate gametophytes of all living land plants, and thus have a wide variety of gametangium positions and developmental patterns.

Gametangia are typically borne on the tips of shoots, but may also be found in the axils of leaves, under thalli or on elaborate structures called gametangiophores.

Bryophyte species may be:

- Autoicous meaning that androecia and gynoecia are found on the same individual (monoicous) but in distinctly separate locations. If these are on separate branches, the term cladautoicous can be applied.
- Synoicous (also called androgynous) bryophytes produce antheridia and archegonia interspersed in the same cluster.
- Paroicous bryophytes produce antheridia and archegonia in separate clusters in different leaf axils.
- Heteroicous bryophyte species may be either monoicous or sequentially dioicous depending on environmental conditions. This condition is also called polygamous or polyoicous.

== Role in survival ==
There can be both selective advantages and selective disadvantages for organisms that are monoicous or dioicous. Monoicous bryophytes can easily reproduce sexually, since both sexes can be found on the same organism. On the other hand, this can lead to inbreeding and reduce genetic variation within populations. Dioicous organisms necessarily exchange genes with other organisms of the species during sexual reproduction, increasing heterozygosity and variability (given a sufficiently large variable mating population). If isolated, however, organisms may only reproduce asexually, which could present a severe selective disadvantage over time. Bryophyte sperm dispersal can therefore be key to species longevity, particularly in dioicous species. While sperm dispersal is typically passive, with sperm dispersing through water, certain species exhibit very active dispersal mechanisms, such as aerial dispersal recently described in the liverwort Conocephalum conicum.

== Evolution ==
The ancestral sexual system in bryophytes is unknown but it has been suggested monoicy and dioicy evolved several times.

In the liverwort genus Radula it was found that monoicy was a recent evolutionary acquisition connected to epiphytism, arising 6 times.

== See also ==
- Hermaphrodite
