= Dioicy =

Sexual system in non-vascular plants

Dioicy is a sexual system in non-vascular plants where archegonia (female organs) and antheridia (male organs) are produced on separate plants in the gametophyte phase. It is one of the two main sexual systems in bryophytes, the other being monoicy. Both dioicous and monoicous gametophytes produce gametes in gametangia by mitosis rather than meiosis, so that sperm and eggs are genetically identical with their parent gametophyte.

== Description ==
Dioicy promotes outcrossing. Sexual dimorphism is commonly found in dioicous species. Dioicy is correlated with reduced sporophyte production, due to spatial separation of male and female colonies, scarcity or absence of males.

The term dioecy is inapplicable to bryophytes because it refers to the sexuality of vascular plant sporophytes. Nonetheless dioecy and dioicy are comparable in many respects.

== Etymology ==
The words dioicous and di(o)ecious are derived from οἶκος or οἰκία and δι- (di-), twice, double. ((o)e is the Latin way of transliterating Greek οι, whereas oi is a more straightforward modern way.) Generally, the term and "dioicous" have been restricted to description of haploid sexuality (gametophytic sexuality), and are thus primarily to describe bryophytes in which the gametophyte is the dominant generation. Meanwhile, "dioecious" is used to describe diploid sexuality (sporophytic sexuality), and thus is used to describe tracheophytes (vascular plants) in which the sporophyte is the dominant generation.

== Occurrence ==
Sixty-eight percent of liverwort species, 57% to 60% of moss species, and 40% of hornwort species are dioicous. Dioicy also occurs in algae such as Charales and Coleochaetales.It is also prevalent in brown algae.

In all cases sex determination is genetic.

== Evolution of dioicy ==
The ancestral sexual system in bryophytes is unknown but it has been suggested monoicy and dioicy evolved several times. It has also been suggested that dioicy is a plesiomorphic character for bryophytes. In order for dioicy to evolve from monoicy it needs two mutations, a male sterility mutation and a female sterility mutation.

Hornworts have gone through twice as many transitions from dioicy to monoicy than monoicy to dioicy.

Among moss species the transition from monoicy to dioicy is more common than dioicy to monoicy with there being at least 133 transitions from monoicy to dioicy in moss. Sexual specialization has been used as an explanation for this recurring evolution of dioicy in mosses.
