= Monoecy =

Sexual system in seed plants

Monoecy (from Ancient Greek μονοικία (monoikía) 'one household'; adj. monoecious), is a sexual system in seed plants where separate male and female cones or flowers are present on the same plant. It is a monomorphic sexual system comparable with gynomonoecy, andromonoecy and trimonoecy, and contrasted with dioecy where individual plants produce cones or flowers of only one sex, and with bisexual or hermaphroditic plants in which male and female gametes are produced in the same flower.

Monoecy often co-occurs with anemophily, because it prevents self-pollination of individual flowers and reduces the probability of self-pollination between male and female flowers on the same plant.

Monoecy in angiosperms has been of interest for evolutionary biologists since Charles Darwin.

== Terminology ==
Monoecious comes from the Greek words for one house.

== History ==
The term monoecy was first introduced in 1735 by Carl Linnaeus. Darwin noted that the flowers of monoecious species sometimes showed traces of the opposite sex function, suggesting that they evolved via hermaphroditism.

== Occurrence ==
Monoecy is most common in temperate climates and is often associated with inefficient pollinators or wind-pollinated plants. It may be beneficial to reducing pollen-stigma interference, thus increasing seed production.

Around 10% of all seed plant species are monoecious. A substantial majority of conifers are monoecious, including the entirety of Pinaceae and most of Cupressaceae. It is present in 7% of angiosperms. Almost all of the order Fagales are monoecious, including all of the major temperate tree genera Alnus (alder), Betula (birch), Castanea (chestnut), Fagus (beech), Juglans (walnut), and Quercus (oak). Most Cucurbitaceae are monoecious including most watermelon cultivars. It is prevalent in Euphorbiaceae. Dioecy is replaced by monoecy in polyploid populations of Mercurialis annua. Monoecious hemp was first reported in 1929.

=== Maize ===
Maize is monoecious since both pistillate (female) and stamenate (male) flowers occur on the same plant. The pistillate flowers are present on the ears of corn and the stamenate flowers are in the tassel at the top of the stalk. In the ovules of the pistillate flowers, diploid cells called megaspore mother cells undergo meiosis to produce haploid megaspores. In the anthers of the stamenate flowers, diploid pollen mother cells undergo meiosis to produce pollen grains. Meiosis in maize requires gene product RAD51, a protein employed in recombinational repair of DNA double-strand breaks.

== Evolution ==
The evolution of monoecy has received little attention.

Male and female flowers evolve from hermaphroditic flowers via andromonoecy or gynomonoecy.

In amaranths monoecy may have evolved from hermaphroditism through various processes caused by male sterility genes and female fertility genes.

Monoecy may be an intermediate state between hermaphroditism and dioecy. Evolution from dioecy to monoecy probably involves disruptive selection on floral sex ratios. Monoecy is also considered to be a step in the evolutionary pathway from hermaphroditism towards dioecy. Some authors even argue monoecy and dioecy are related. But, there is also evidence that monoecy is a pathway from sequential hermaphroditism to dioecy.

== See also ==
- Hermaphrodite
- Plant reproductive morphology
