= Gynomonoecy =

Sexual system in flowering plants

Illustrates gynomonoecy: when a plant species has both female (pink) and androgynous (purple) flowers on the same plant

Gynomonoecy is defined as the presence of both female and hermaphrodite flowers on the same individual of a plant species. It is prevalent in Asteraceae but is poorly understood.

It is a monomorphic sexual system comparable with monoecy, andromonoecy and trimonoecy.

== Occurrence ==
This sexual system occurs in about 2.8% of flowering plants. It is present in 3% of Silene species and 23 families of flowering plants, but is most common in the daisy family, Asteraceae. Of the approximately 23000 species in the Asteraceae about 200 are gynomonoecious.

== Evolution ==
Gynomonoecy may be an intermediate evolutionary state between monoecy and hermaphroditism. It is also postulated to be the ancestor to trimonoecy.

Gynomonecy evolved once in Hawaiian Tetramolopium.

In families like Compositae or Chenopodiaceae, gynomonoecy is considered leading path to monoecy from hermaphroditism and vice versa.
