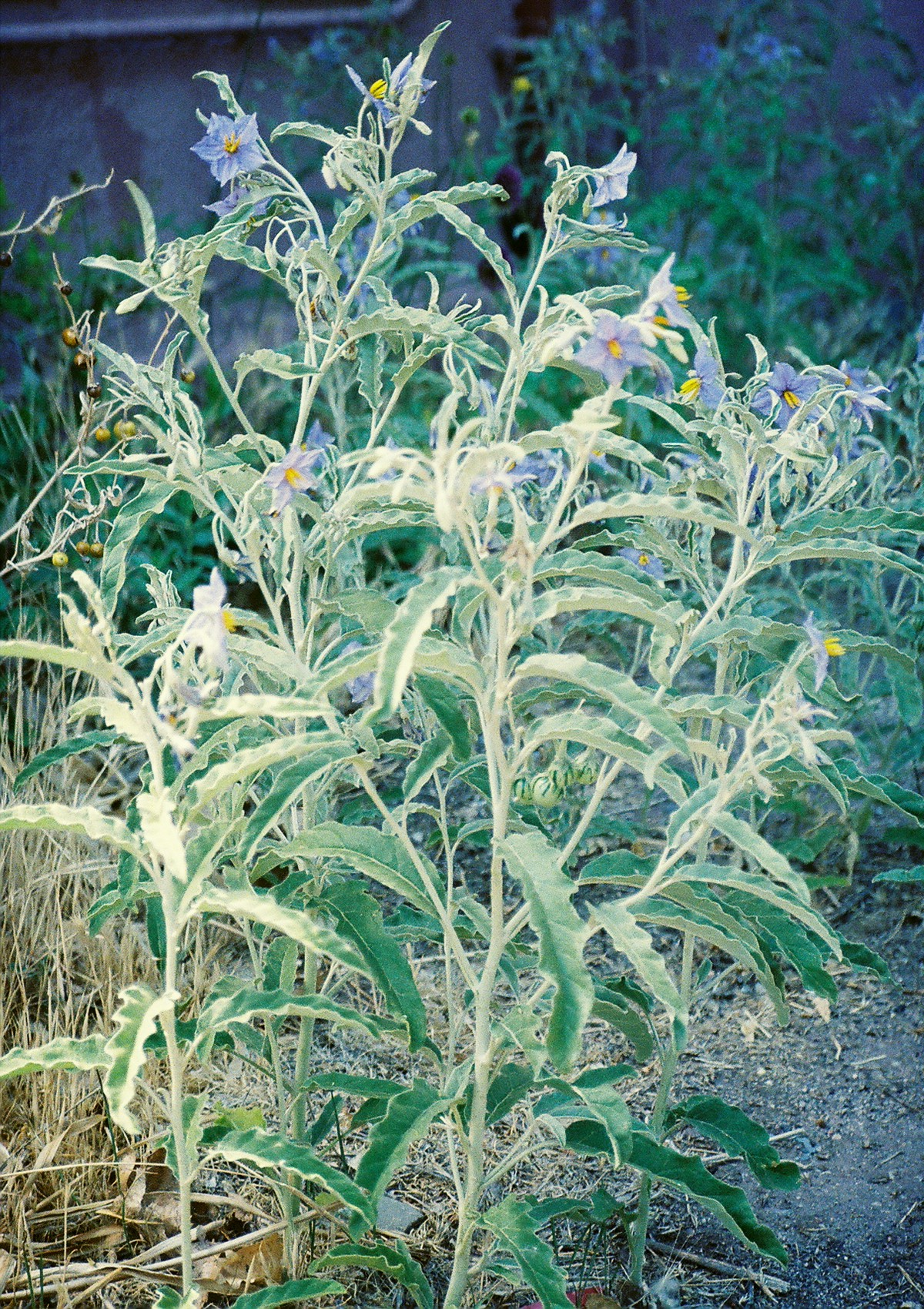
- Plant with flowers, unripe berries (green with stripes, center), and previous year's berries (orange, upper left)

Scientific classification
- Kingdom: Plantae
- Clade: Tracheophytes
- Clade: Angiosperms
- Clade: Eudicots
- Clade: Asterids
- Order: Solanales
- Family: Solanaceae
- Genus: Solanum
- Species: S. elaeagnifolium

Binomial name
- Solanum elaeagnifolium Cav.

Synonyms
- See text

= Solanum elaeagnifolium =

Species of flowering plant

Solanum elaeagnifolium, the silverleaf nightshade or silver-leaved nightshade, is a species of plant in the nightshade family native to North and South America. It is common in parts of southwestern USA, and sometimes weed of western North America. Other common names include prairie berry, silverleaf nettle, white horsenettle or silver nightshade. In South Africa it is known as silver-leaf bitter-apple or satansbos ("Satan's bush" in Afrikaans). More ambiguous names include "bull-nettle", "horsenettle" and the Spanish "trompillo".

Solanum elaeagnifolium was described by A. J. Cavanilles. The plant described under the same name by W. Herbert and C. L. Willdenow based on E.G. von Steudel is Solanum aethiopicum.

== Description ==
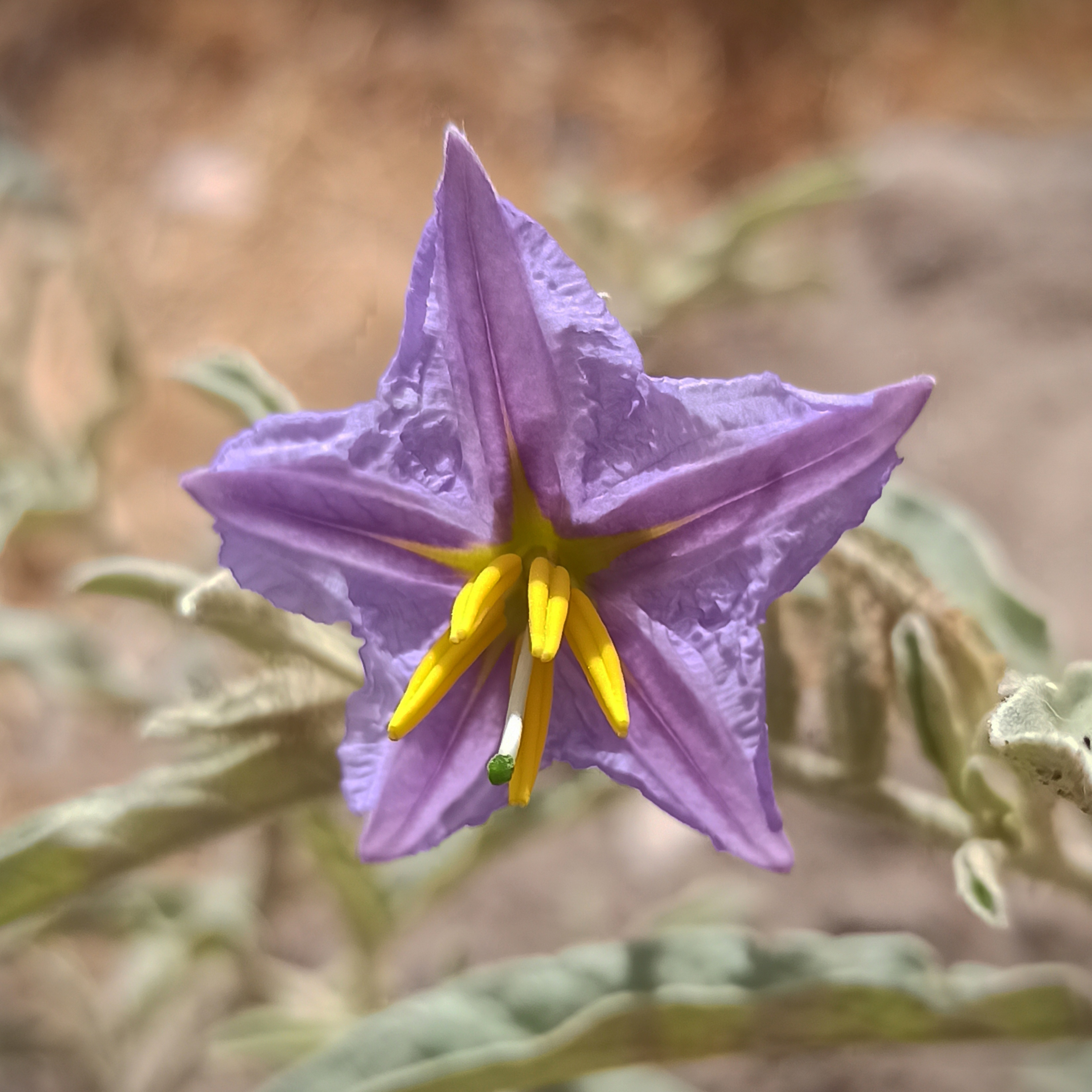
Closeup of S. elaeagnifolium flower

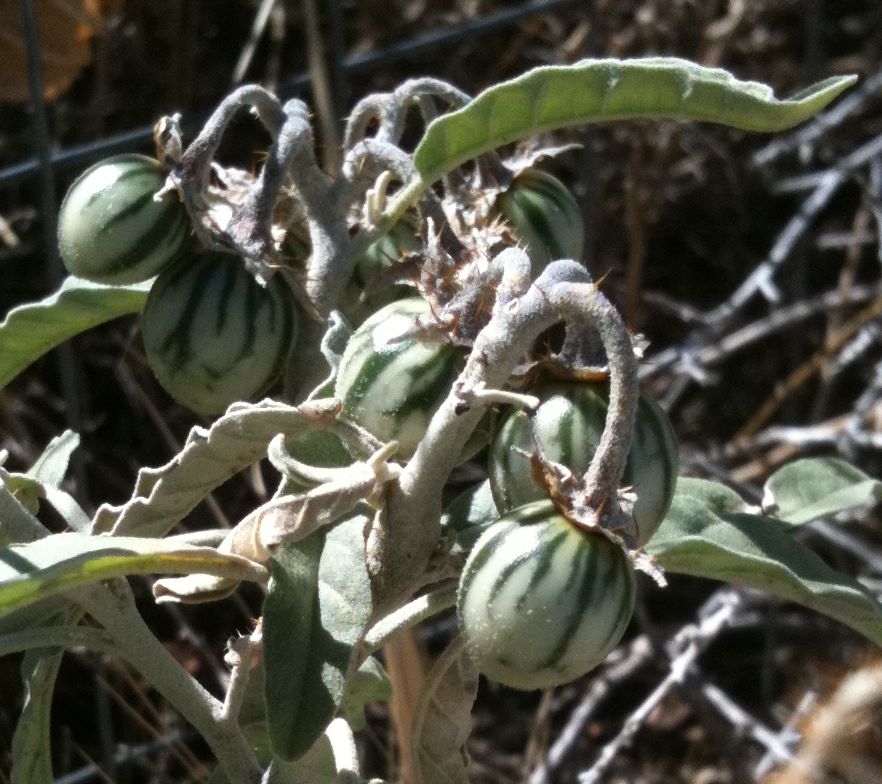
Closeup of S. elaeagnifolium berries

It is a perennial 10 cm (3.9 in) to 1 m in height. The stems are covered with nettle-like spines less than 0.5 cm (0.20 in) long, ranging from very few on some plants to very dense on others. Leaves and stems are covered with downy hairs (trichomes) that lie against and hide the surface, giving a silvery or grayish appearance.

The leaves are up to 15 cm long and 0.5 to 2.5 cm wide, with shallowly waved edges, which distinguish it from the closely related Carolina Horsenettle (S. carolinense), which has wider, more deeply indented leaves. The flowers, appearing from April to August, have five petals united to form a star, ranging from blue to pale lavender or occasionally white; five yellow stamens and a pistil form a projecting center. The plant produces glossy yellow, orange, or red berries that last all winter and may turn brown as they dry.

== Ecology ==
It can grow in poor soil with very little water. It spreads by rhizomes as well as seeds, and is common in disturbed habitats. It is very hard to control, as root stocks less than 1 cm long can regenerate into plants.

Its distribution around the globe is in the regions of Mediterranean, South Australia, South Africa, US, Mexico and South America. In the US, its range is from Kansas south to Louisiana, and west through the Mexican-border states of the United States into and in Mexico. In South America it is found in Uruguay, Argentina, and Chile. It may have originated in North America and been accidentally introduced to South America or the reverse. It is considered a noxious weed in 21 U.S. states and in countries such as Australia, Egypt, Greece, India, Israel, Italy, South Africa, and Zimbabwe.

In a 15-year research study it was indicated that important factors for its expansion are: Elevation of 0-100m, soils with fine texture and in subsoil of medium water availability, soils with high base saturation of the topsoil and low topsoil organic carbon. Also it seems to prefer agricultural use areas, multi-lane road sides and areas near human settlements.

In another study, on allelopathic effects with other plants, it was shown that white oak extract impedes its germination.

A five-year study found that frequent mowing of silverleaf nightshade contributes toward making it a 'superweed', with a deeper taproot, a spikier stem, and greater toxicity to grazing caterpillars.

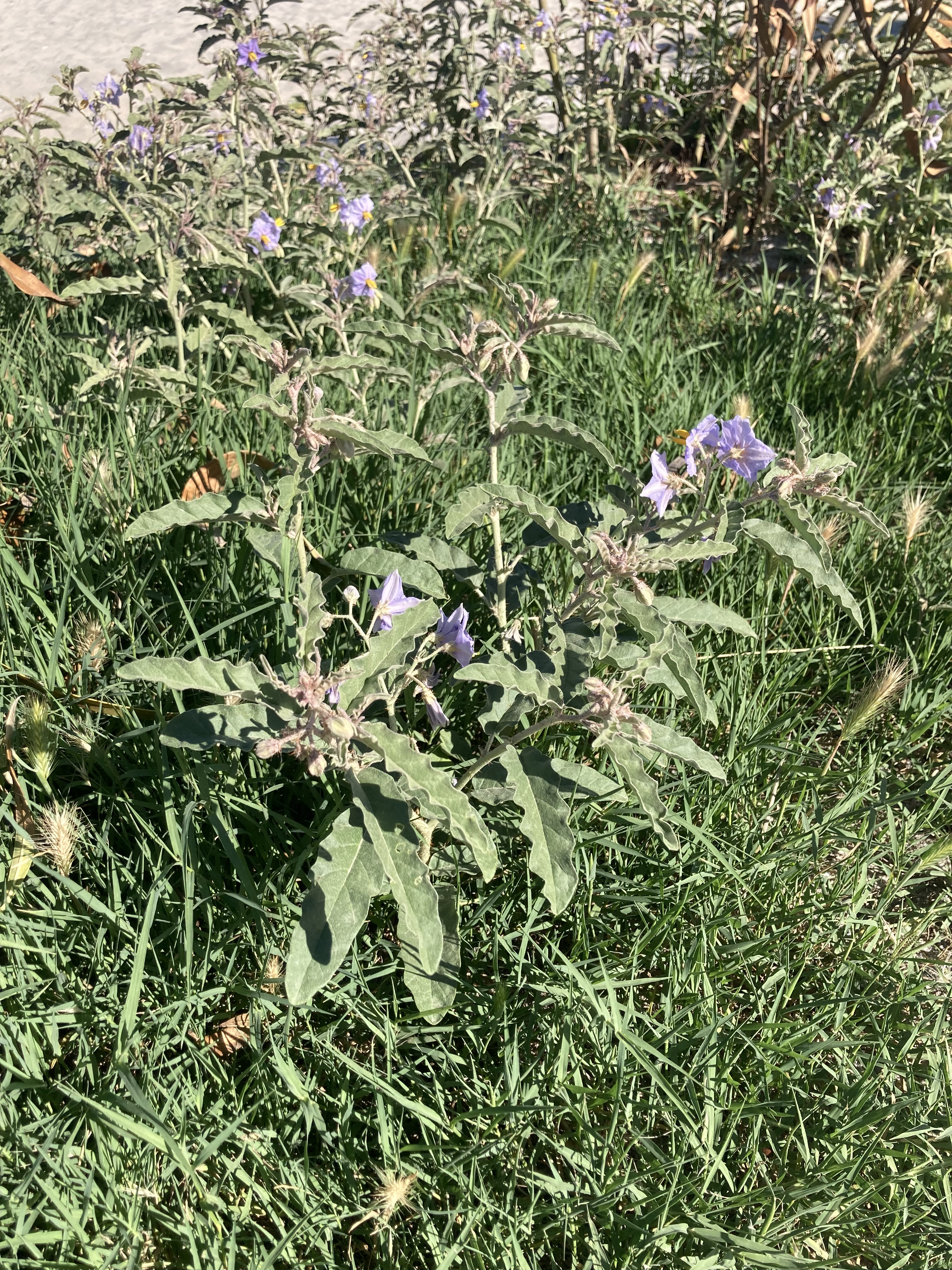
Solanum elaeagnifolium in Paralia,Greece.

== Toxicity ==
The whole plant is toxic to both humans and livestock, even dried.

Ingestion of silverleaf nightshade has been implicated as a cause of ivermectin toxicosis in horses given the recommended dosage of the drug. Metabolites from the plant are speculated to disrupt the blood–brain barrier, allowing ivermectin to enter and disrupt neurotransmitter function in the brain and spinal cord.

Its thin spines can cause weed dermatitis.

The Pima Native Americans used the berries as a vegetable rennet, and the Kiowa used the seeds together with brain tissue to tan leather.

== Synonyms ==
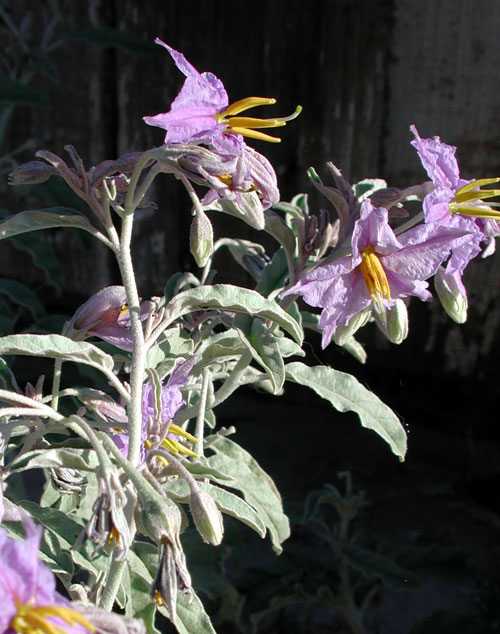
Flowering branch of S. elaeagnifolium

This plant has been described under a range of names, all now invalid. These contain many homonyms among them:

- Solanum dealbatum Lindl.
- Solanum flavidum Torr.
- Solanum incanum Pav. ex Dunal (non L.: preoccupied)

S. incanum of Ruiz & Pavón Jiménez is S. albidum as described by Dunal.
S. incanum of Kitaibel based on Kanitz is S. villosum as described by Philip Miller
S. incanum of Scheff. is S. schefferi.
S. incanum var. lichtensteinii and var. subexarmatum are S. lichtensteinii.

- Solanum leprosum Ortega
- Solanum obtusifolium Dunal (non Willd.: preoccupied)

S. obtusifolium of Hartweg based on Otto Sendtner in von Martius is S. ferrugineum.
S. obtusifolium of Willdenow is S. aethiopicum.

- Solanum pyriforme var. uniflorum Dunal
- Solanum roemerianum Scheele
- Solanum saponaceum Hook. (non Dunal: preoccupied)

S. saponaceum of Welwitsch is S. aculeastrum.
S. saponaceum var. uruguense is S. bonariense.

- Solanum texense Engelm. & A.Gray
- Solanum uniflorum Meyen ex Nees (non Dunal: preoccupied)

S. uniflorum of de Conceição Vellozo is S. pseudocapsicum.
S. uniflorum of Sessé & Mociño and S. uniflorum of Dunal in Poiret have been identified as Lycianthes mociniana.
S. uniflorum of Lagasca y Segura and Solanum uniflorum var. berterianum are undetermined species of Lycianthes.

Several varieties and forms of S. elaeagnifolium have been named. They are not usually considered taxonomically distinct:

- Solanum elaeagnifolium f. albiflorum Cockerell
- Solanum elaeagnifolium var. angustifolium Kuntze

Not to be confused with S. angustifolium of Philip Miller

- Solanum elaeagnifolium var. argyrocroton Griseb.
- Solanum elaeagnifolium f. benkei Standl.
- Solanum elaeagnifolium var. grandiflorum Griseb.

Not to be confused with S. grandiflorum of Ruiz and Pavón Jiménez

- Solanum elaeagnifolium var. leprosum (Ortega) Dunal
- Solanum elaeagnifolium var. obtusifolium (Dunal) Dunal

S. elaeagnifolium var. ovalifolium does not refer to the S. ovalifolium as described by Dunal and does not belong to the present species; it is actually S. aridum. Meanwhile, S. crispum var. elaeagnifolium is just the normal S. crispum of Ruiz and Pavón Jiménez.

== Footnotes ==
- California Department of Food and Agriculture (CDFA) [2008]: Encycloweedia – Solanum part 2. Retrieved 2008-SEP-26.
- Cronquist, Arthur; Holmgren, Arthur H.; Holmgren, Noel H.; Reveal, James L. & Holmgren, Patricia K. (1984): Intermountain Flora; Vascular Plants of the Intermountain West, U.S.A. (Vol. 4. Subclass Asteridae except Asteraceae). The New York Botanical Garden. ISBN 0-89327-248-5
- Niehaus, Theodore F.; Ripper, Charles L. & Savage, Virginia (1984): A Field Guide to Southwestern and Texas Wildflowers. Houghton Mifflin Company, ISBN 0-395-36640-2
- Nugent, Martin (ed.) (2005): Oregon Invasive Species Action Plan. PDF fulltext
- Solanaceae Source [2008]: Solanum elaeagnifolium. Retrieved 2008-SEP-26.
- United States Department of Agriculture (USDA) (2006): Germplasm Resources Information Network - Solanum elaeagnifolium. Version of 2006-JAN-14. Retrieved 2008-SEP-26.
- Washington State Noxious Weed Control Board (WSNWCB) (2008): Silverleaf Nightshade. Version of 2008-JUL-09. Retrieved 2008-SEP-26.
