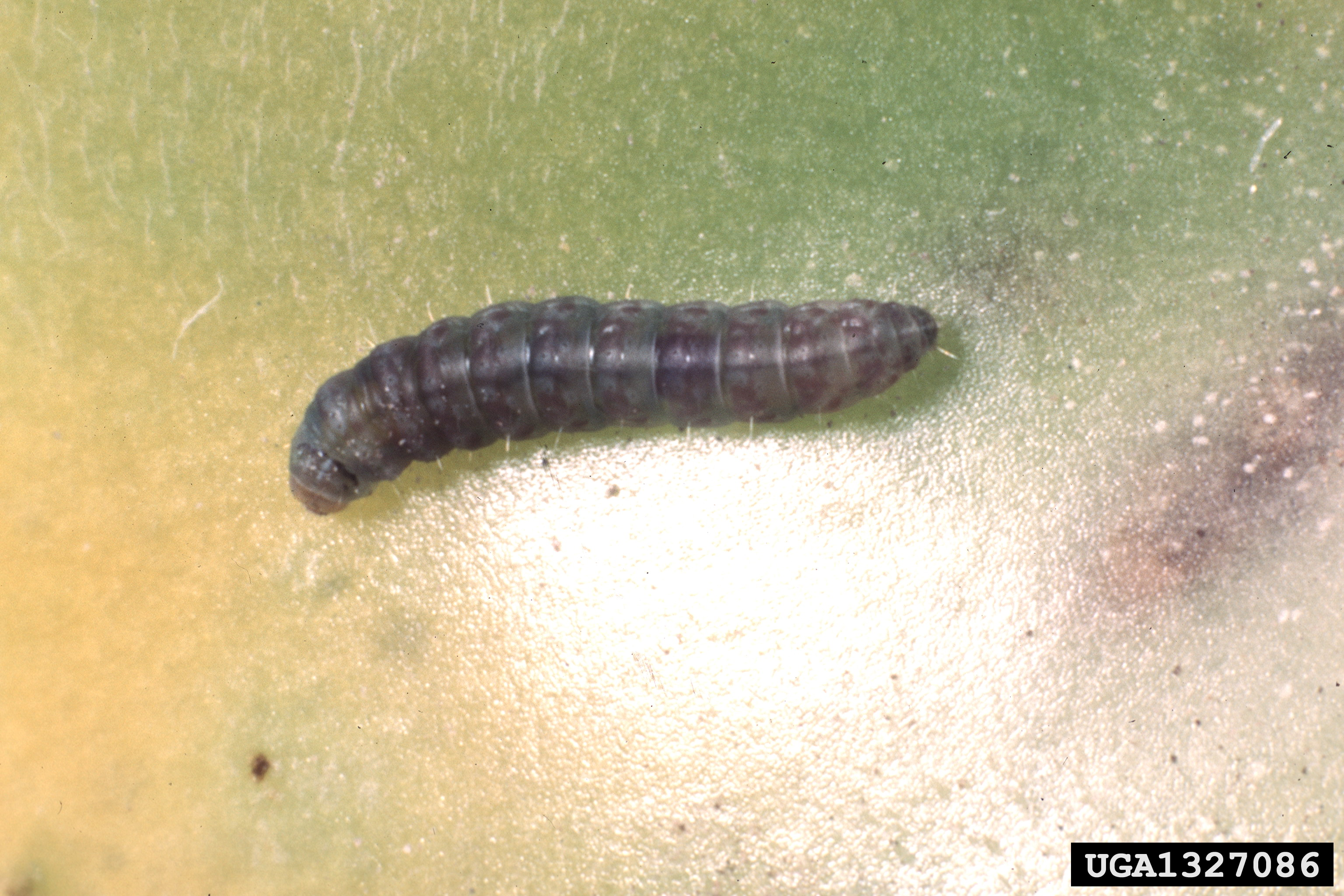

Scientific classification
- Kingdom: Animalia
- Phylum: Arthropoda
- Clade: Pancrustacea
- Class: Insecta
- Order: Lepidoptera
- Family: Gelechiidae
- Genus: Keiferia
- Species: K. lycopersicella

Binomial name
- Keiferia lycopersicella (Walsingham, 1897)

Synonyms
- Eucatoptus lycopersicella Walsingham, 1897; Aristotelia lycopersicella Walsingham; Gnorimoschema lycopersicella (Busck, 1928); Phthorimaea lenta Meyrick, 1917; Phthorimaea lycopersicella Busck, 1928

= Keiferia lycopersicella =

Tomato pinworm

Species of moth

Keiferia lycopersicella, the tomato pinworm, is a moth of the family Gelechiidae. It is found in warm areas in Mexico, California, Texas, Georgia, Florida, Hawaii, Cuba, Hispaniola and the Bahamas. It has also been reported from greenhouses in Delaware, Mississippi, Missouri, Pennsylvania and Virginia.

The wingspan is 9–12 mm. There are seven to eight generations per year.

The larvae feed on Solanaceae species, including Lycopersicon esculentum, Solanum melongena, Solanum tuberosum, Solanum carolinense, Solanum xanthii, Solanum umbelliferum and Solanum bahamense. Young larvae use silk to spin a tent. Under the cover of this tent they create a tunnel into a leaf of their host. They may also enter stems or fruits.
