= Andromonoecy =

Sexual system in flowering plants

Illustrates andromonoecy: when a plant species has both male (blue) and androgynous (purple) flowers on the same plant

Andromonoecy is a breeding system of plant species in which male and hermaphrodite flowers are on the same plant. It is a monomorphic sexual system comparable with monoecy, gynomonoecy and trimonoecy. Andromonoecy is frequent among genera with zygomorphic flowers, however it is overall rare and occurs in less than 2% of plant species. Nonetheless the breeding system has gained interest among biologists in the study of sex expression.

== Etymology ==
The word andromonoecious is a combination of andr- (meaning male) and monoecious and was first used in 1877.

== Prevalence ==
Andromonoecy is uncommon and has been estimated to occur in less than 2% of plant species. In angiosperms, it occurs in 1.7% of angiosperms making up around 4000 species in 33 families. It is common in the grass subfamily Panicoideae.

=== Andromonoecious species ===
- Cucumis melo subsp
- Cucumis melo
- Chaerophyllum bulbosum
- Erophaca baetica
- Silene tibetica

=== Solanum ===
- Solanum agnewiorum
- Solanum aureitomentosum
- Solanum campylacanthum
- Solanum carolinense
- Solanum cerasiferum
- Solanum incanum
- Solanum insanum
- Solanum lichtensteinii
- Solanum linnaeanum
- Solanum melongena
- Solanum rigidum
- Solanum umtuma
- Solanum usambarsense

== Evolution ==
Some authors view andromonoecy as a transitional state from hermaphroditism to monoecy. It has been suggested that andromonoecy evolved from hermaphroditism due to the loss of female structures.

Andromonoecy is also considered an evolutionary step towards dioecy. If female flowers are better at producing seeds than hermaphroditic ones, andromonoecy could evolve towards monoecy.
