= Keiferia glochinella =

Scientific classification
- Kingdom: Animalia
- Phylum: Arthropoda
- Clade: Pancrustacea
- Class: Insecta
- Order: Lepidoptera
- Family: Gelechiidae
- Genus: Keiferia
- Species: K. glochinella

Binomial name
- Keiferia glochinella (Zeller, 1873)

Synonyms
- Gelechia glochinella Zeller, 1873; Tildenia glochinella; Keiferia peniculo Heinrich, 1946

Species of moth

Keiferia glochinella, the eggplant leafminer moth, is a moth in the family Gelechiidae. It was described by Zeller in 1873. It is found in the United States, where it has been recorded from Texas, New Mexico and California. Records outside the western United States are based on misidentifications.

The length of the forewings is 4.5–5 mm. Adults are yellowish gray, light gray to gray, mottled with dark gray and yellowish-orange.

The larvae feed on Solanum carolinense. They mine the leaves of their host plant. Full-grown larvae reach a length of about 8 mm.
