= Apple of Sodom (disambiguation) =

Apple of Sodom (Calotropis procera) is a species of milkweed in the family Apocynaceae native to the Dead Sea and Sodom, Israel and other desert regions.

Apple of Sodom may also refer to:

- Solanum carolinense or Carolina horsenettle, a nightshade native to North America
- Solanum linnaeanum or devil's apple, formerly Solanum sodomeum, an invasive nightshade native to South Africa
- Solanum mammosum or nipplefruit, a nightshade native to South America
- "Apple of Sodom" (song), a song by Marilyn Manson
- Apples of Sodom, a 1913 Edison film

== See also ==
- Soda apple
