= Silene tibetica =

Scientific classification
- Kingdom: Plantae
- Clade: Tracheophytes
- Clade: Angiosperms
- Clade: Eudicots
- Order: Caryophyllales
- Family: Caryophyllaceae
- Genus: Silene
- Species: S. tibetica

Binomial name
- Silene tibetica Lidén & Oxelman

Species of plant

Silene tibetica is a species of plant which is a member of the family Caryophyllaceae. The species can be found in Tibet.

According to Bengt Oxelman, Magnus Lidén, and Nicholas J. Turland this species is not similar to any other species of Silene and is possibly related to S. indica.

Silene tibetica is the only Silene species where andromonecy has been reported.
