= Keiferia inconspicuella =

Scientific classification
- Domain: Eukaryota
- Kingdom: Animalia
- Phylum: Arthropoda
- Class: Insecta
- Order: Lepidoptera
- Family: Gelechiidae
- Genus: Keiferia
- Species: K. inconspicuella

Binomial name
- Keiferia inconspicuella (Murtfeldt, 1883)

Synonyms
- Gelechia inconspicuella Murtfeldt, 1883; Tildenia inconspicuella; Gelechia cinerella Murtfeldt, 1881 (preocc. Clerck, 1759)

Species of moth

Keiferia inconspicuella is a moth in the family Gelechiidae. It was described by Mary Murtfeldt in 1883. It is found in North America, where it has been recorded from the south-eastern and mid-western United States, north to New Jersey and Iowa and west to Nebraska and Texas.

The length of the forewings is 5-5.5 mm.

The larvae feed on Solanum carolinense and Solanum melongena. They mine the leaves of their host plant. Full-grown larvae are green and reach a length of 7–8 mm.
