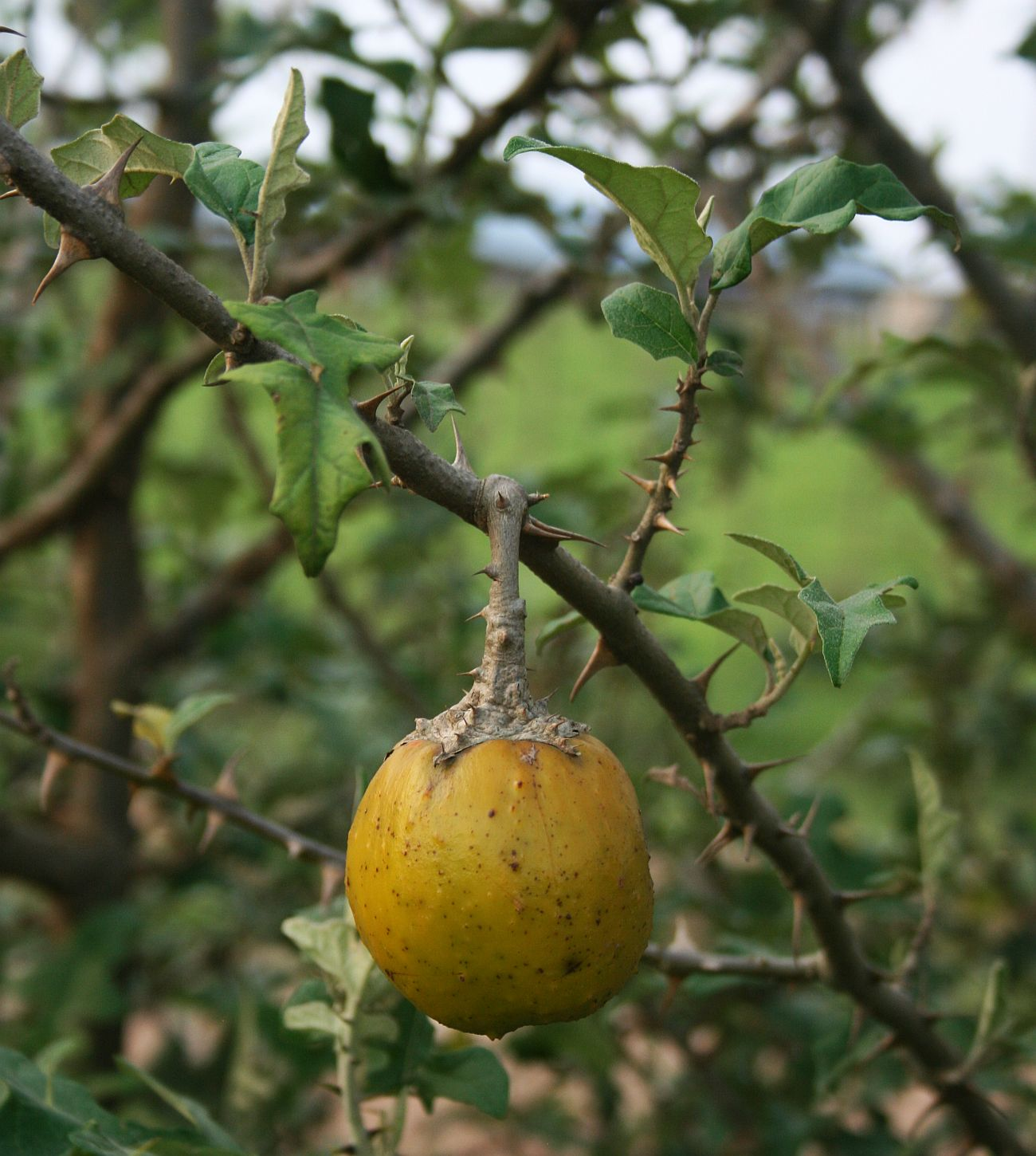

Scientific classification
- Kingdom: Plantae
- Clade: Tracheophytes
- Clade: Angiosperms
- Clade: Eudicots
- Clade: Asterids
- Order: Solanales
- Family: Solanaceae
- Genus: Solanum
- Species: S. aculeastrum

Binomial name
- Solanum aculeastrum Dunal

Synonyms
- See text

= Solanum aculeastrum =

Species of plant

Solanum aculeastrum is commonly known as soda apple, sodaapple nightshade, goat apple, poison apple, or more ambiguously as "bitter-apple". It is a poisonous nightshade species from Africa and only distantly related to true apples. The term "soda apple" probably derives from "Sodom apple", modified due to the fruit's detergent properties.

== Description ==
It is a shrub or small tree native to tropical Africa East to South Africa, in a wide range of soil, terrain, and climatic conditions. It is highly branched and reaches 1–5 m high, with numerous sharp, hooked, brown thorns. The leaves are ovate, up to 15 cm long and 13 cm broad, with lobed margins and downy undersides. It flowers (in South Africa) from September to July, peaking from November to March. The petals are white to pale violet surrounding the ovary, the flower also has a bitter, sour smell. These yield to fruit from April to January, peaking in June and November. These smooth, round berries are 6 cm in diameter and fade from green to yellow as they ripen. These berries contain high levels of the poisonous alkaloid solanine. The species name aculeastrum refers to the thorns that adorn most parts of the shrub.

== Uses ==
Because of its dense growth and prickly nature, soda apple is used as a hedge and living barrier for containing livestock. It is often used as a soap replacement, as it is high in saponin. Traditional Zulu practices use the fruit - fresh, boiled, or charred - in herbal medicine to treat a wide variety of afflictions, including cancer, toothaches, and ringworm. The Taita tribe of southern Kenya use the ripe yellow fruit to treat paronychia. The roots are chewed and, the sap ingested to alleviate stomach aches.

== Synonyms ==
The soda apple has been described under a range of junior synonyms, now invalid. Several of these are ambiguous homonyms:

- Solanum albifolium C.H.Wright
- Solanum conraui Dammer
- Solanum dregei C.Presl

The S. dregei described by Dunal in de Candolle is now S. capense.

- Solanum horridissimum Hort. Par. ex Sendtn. (nomen nudum)
- Solanum protodasypogon Bitter
- Solanum rugulosum De Wild.
- Solanum saponaceum Welw. (non Dunal: preoccupied)

The Solanum saponaceum described by W.J. Hooker is the S. elaeagnifolium of Cavanilles.
Solanum saponaceum var. uruguense, described by Grisebach, is now S. bonariense.

- Solanum sepiaceum Dammer
- Solanum subhastatum De Wild.

Solanum subhastatum as described by L.B. Smith and Downs is now S. cylindricum.
Solanum spectabile var. subhastatum as described by Otto Sendtner in von Martius is the S. affine of Sendtner.

- Solanum thomsonii C.H.Wright

The botanist Bitter distinguished a number of subspecies and varieties of the soda apple, but these are not considered valid taxa anymore:

- Solanum aculeastrum ssp. pachychlamys Bitter
- S. a. ssp. sepiaceum (Dammer) Bitter
- S. a. var. albifolium (C.H.Wright) Bitter
- S. a. var. conraui (Dammer) Bitter
- S. a. var. exarmatum Bitter
- S. a. var. parceaculeastrum Bitter
