= Keiferia georgei =

Scientific classification
- Kingdom: Animalia
- Phylum: Arthropoda
- Clade: Pancrustacea
- Class: Insecta
- Order: Lepidoptera
- Family: Gelechiidae
- Genus: Keiferia
- Species: K. georgei

Binomial name
- Keiferia georgei (Hodges, 1985)

Synonyms
- Tildenia georgei Hodges, 1985

Species of moth

Keiferia georgei is a moth in the family Gelechiidae. It was described by Ronald W. Hodges in 1985. It is found in North America, where it has been recorded from Illinois.

The larvae feed on Physalis heterophylla var. ambigua. They mine the leaves of their host plant.
