= Keiferia colombiana =

Scientific classification
- Kingdom: Animalia
- Phylum: Arthropoda
- Clade: Pancrustacea
- Class: Insecta
- Order: Lepidoptera
- Family: Gelechiidae
- Genus: Keiferia
- Species: K. colombiana

Binomial name
- Keiferia colombiana Povolný, 1975

Species of moth

Keiferia colombiana is a moth in the family Gelechiidae. It was described by Povolný in 1975. It is found in Colombia.
