= Keiferia propria =

Scientific classification
- Kingdom: Animalia
- Phylum: Arthropoda
- Clade: Pancrustacea
- Class: Insecta
- Order: Lepidoptera
- Family: Gelechiidae
- Genus: Keiferia
- Species: K. propria

Binomial name
- Keiferia propria Povolný, 1990

Species of moth

Keiferia propria is a moth in the family Gelechiidae. It was described by Povolný in 1990. It is found in Peru.
