= Península de Hualpén Nature Sanctuary =

Nature sanctuary in Chile

- IUCN category IV (habitat/species management area)
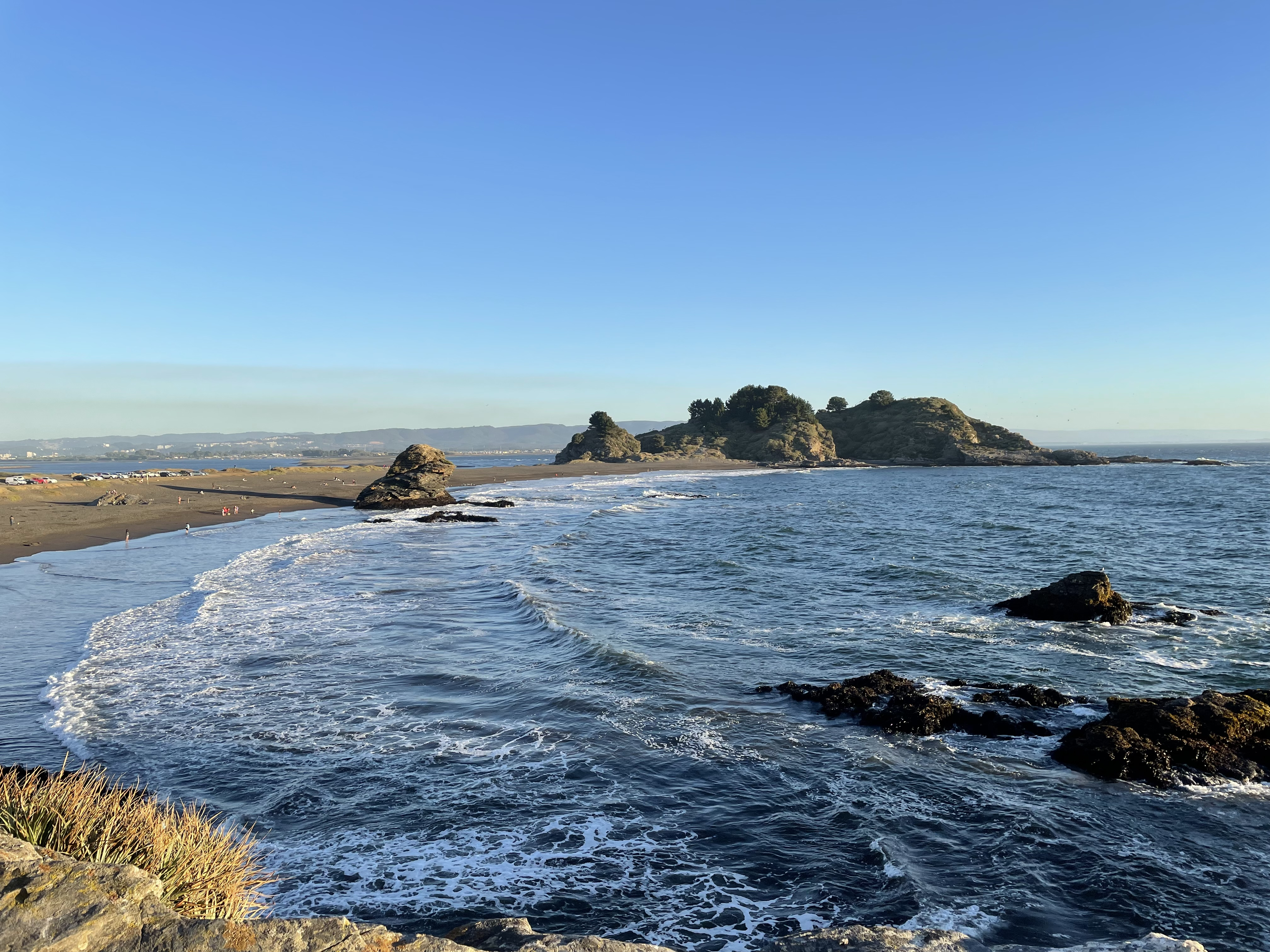
- Interactive map of Península de Hualpén Nature Sanctuary
- Location: Concepción, Biobío, Chile
- Nearest city: Hualpén
- Coordinates: 36.78°S 73.17°W
- Area: 23.38 km^{2} (9.03 sq mi)
- Designation: Nature sanctuary
- Designated: 1976

Península de Hualpén Nature Sanctuary is a protected area near Concepción in Biobío Region of central Chile. The sanctuary covers the Hualpén Peninsula, which extends into the Pacific Ocean west of the city of Hualpén and north of the mouth of the Biobío River.

In July 2018, a company called Agrícola Agrinama S.A. proposed a residential real-estate project on the peninsula that could house 5,000 people. However, the project faces opposition as it could destroy much of the natural biodiversity of the peninsula.

The peninsula is home to 70 types of birds, 14 of which are endangered. One species of moth, Keiferia dalibori, was discovered here in 2010.
