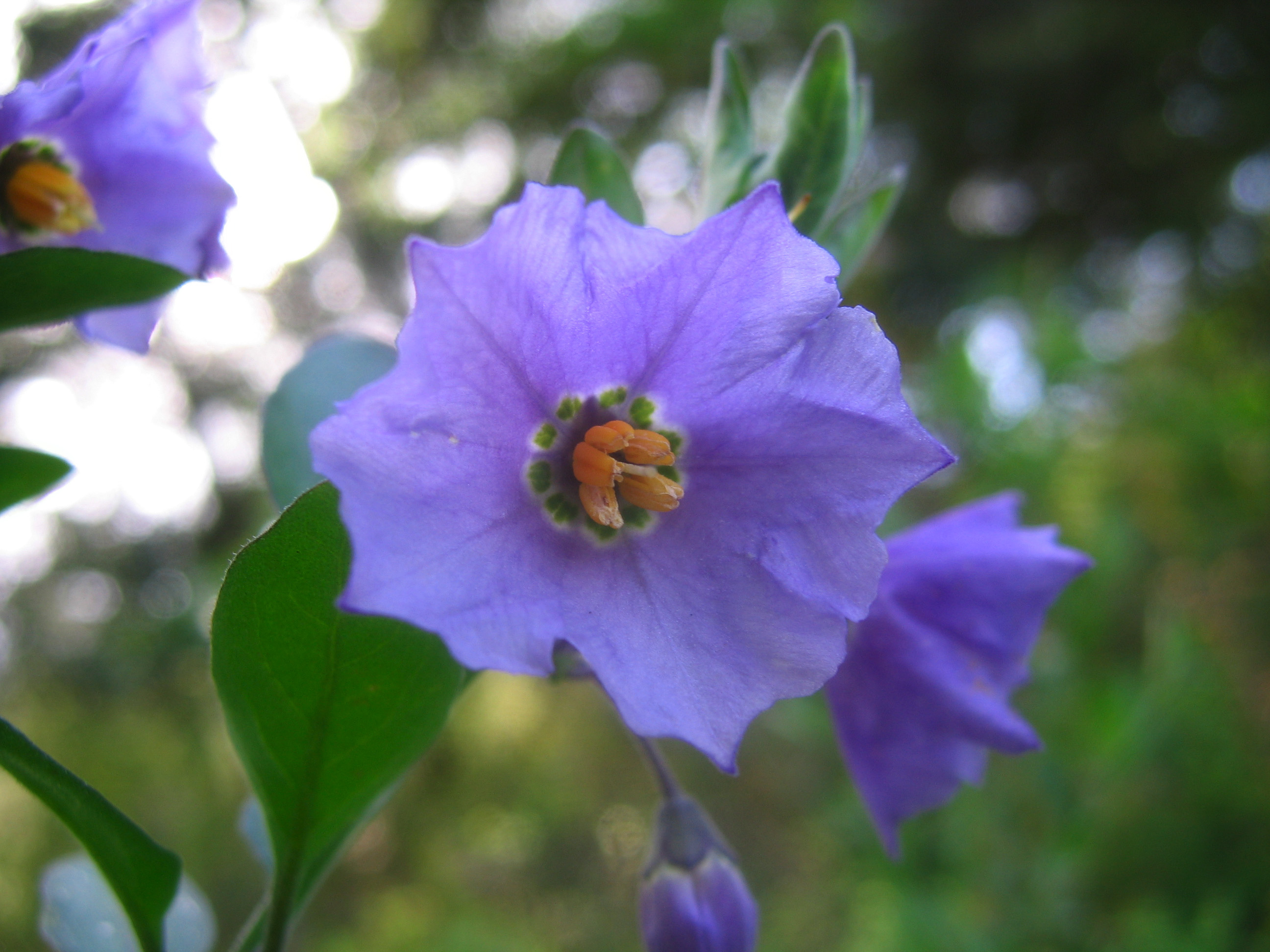

Scientific classification
- Kingdom: Plantae
- Clade: Tracheophytes
- Clade: Angiosperms
- Clade: Eudicots
- Clade: Asterids
- Order: Solanales
- Family: Solanaceae
- Genus: Solanum
- Species: S. umbelliferum
- Variety: S. u. var. xanti

Trinomial name
- Solanum umbelliferum var. xanti (A. Gray) D.J.Keil

Synonyms
- Solanum xanti A.Gray; Solanum xanti var. spencerae J.F.Macbr.

= Solanum umbelliferum var. xanti =

Species of plant

Solanum umbelliferum var. xanti, known commonly as chaparral nightshade, purple nightshade, and San Diego nightshade, is a variety of nightshade. It is native to the western United States in Arizona, California, Nevada, and Oregon, and to north-western Mexico in Baja California.

The plant grows in chaparral, oak woodlands, conifer forests, desert Madrean Sky Islands, and other habitats.

== Description ==
Solanum umbelliferum var. xanti grows as a perennial herb or subshrub producing a branching hairy stem up to about 90 centimetres (35 in) in maximum height. The leaves are up to 7 centimeters long and are lance-shaped to oval, mostly unlobed except for occasional lobes at the bases of the blades.

It flowers from February to June in the wild, bearing an umbel-shaped inflorescence with many purple-blue flowers up to 3 centimeters wide. The fruit is a green berry 1 to 1.5 centimeters wide.

== Cultivation ==
The plant is cultivated as an ornamental plant by specialty plant nurseries for planting in perennial border, drought-tolerant and native plant gardens. It grows from sunny locations to dry shade, such as under native oaks.

The plant is deer resistant, due to its toxic qualities. In common with many other members in the Solanaceace family, all parts of the plant are toxic, especially the unripe fruit. Toxicity is from Solanine and glycol-alkaloids, chaconine, and solasodine. There is no antidote for Solanum poisoning. Symptoms include:

- Cardiovascular system (tachycardia, arrhythmia, and hypotension)
- Central nervous system (delirium, psychomotor, agitation, paralysis, coma, and convulsion)
- Gastrointestinal tract (nausea, vomiting, diarrhea)

Selections

Cultivars available include:

- Solanum umbelliferum var. xanti 'Mountain Pride' — Mountain Pride purple nightshade (large dark purple flowers)

== See also ==
- List of California native plants
- California chaparral and woodlands
