= Keiferia brunnea =

Scientific classification
- Kingdom: Animalia
- Phylum: Arthropoda
- Clade: Pancrustacea
- Class: Insecta
- Order: Lepidoptera
- Family: Gelechiidae
- Genus: Keiferia
- Species: K. brunnea

Binomial name
- Keiferia brunnea Povolný, 1973

Species of moth

Keiferia brunnea is a moth in the family Gelechiidae. It was described by Povolný in 1973. It is found on the Lesser Antilles.
