= Keiferia gudmannella =

Scientific classification
- Domain: Eukaryota
- Kingdom: Animalia
- Phylum: Arthropoda
- Class: Insecta
- Order: Lepidoptera
- Family: Gelechiidae
- Genus: Keiferia
- Species: K. gudmannella

Binomial name
- Keiferia gudmannella (Walsingham, 1897)

Synonyms
- Gelechia gudmannella Walsingham, 1897; Tildenia gudmannella

Species of moth

Keiferia gudmannella is a moth in the family Gelechiidae. It was described by Thomas de Grey in 1897. It is found in the West Indies, where it has been recorded from Cuba, Hispaniola and Puerto Rico.

The wingspan is 8–10 mm. The forewings are pale brownish cinereous, sparsely speckled with black, on the cell before the middle is a minute elongate black streak, followed by a second in the same line with it at the end of the cell. A small black spot on the fold lies below the first streak, and on the costal and apical portion a few slender pale lines are traceable along the veins, but these are very inconspicuous. Around the termen and apex minute groups of blackish scales mark the base of the cilia, through the upper portion of which runs a slender dark line, the cilia being otherwise scarcely paler than the ground-colour. The hindwings are shining greyish.

The larvae feed on Solanum species.
