= Keiferia dalibori =

Scientific classification
- Kingdom: Animalia
- Phylum: Arthropoda
- Clade: Pancrustacea
- Class: Insecta
- Order: Lepidoptera
- Family: Gelechiidae
- Genus: Keiferia
- Species: K. dalibori

Binomial name
- Keiferia dalibori King & Montesinos, 2012

Species of moth

Keiferia dalibori is a moth in the family Gelechiidae. It was described by King and Montesinos in 2012. It is found in southern Chile.

The two scientists captured and discovered two moths from this species using a butterfly net at the Hualpén Peninsula in Chile in November 2010. They named the species in honor of Dalibor Povolný (1924 – 2004), who had worked on the Gnorimoschemini tribe.
