= Solanum cerasiferum =

Scientific classification
- Kingdom: Plantae
- Clade: Tracheophytes
- Clade: Angiosperms
- Clade: Eudicots
- Clade: Asterids
- Order: Solanales
- Family: Solanaceae
- Genus: Solanum
- Species: S. cerasiferum

Binomial name
- Solanum cerasiferum Dunal

Species of plant

Solanum cerasiferum is a species of plant in the nightshade family. It is native to tropical Africa.

The species is andromonoecious. However, the species overall has a weaker andromonoecy than its relatives. The is morphological of this species is similar to Solanum campylacanthum.

The plant is an erect, pale yellow-orange, prickly shrub-like herb that bears spherical berry fruit and flowers.
