= Trompillo =

Trompillo is a common name for several flowering plants in various families in order Solanales and may refer to:

- Ipomoea hederifolia, a species of herbaceous annual vine native to the Americas
- Solanum elaeagnifolium, a common weed of western North America and also found in South America
