= Keiferia chloroneura =

Scientific classification
- Domain: Eukaryota
- Kingdom: Animalia
- Phylum: Arthropoda
- Class: Insecta
- Order: Lepidoptera
- Family: Gelechiidae
- Genus: Keiferia
- Species: K. chloroneura

Binomial name
- Keiferia chloroneura (Meyrick, 1923)

Synonyms
- Aristotelia chloroneura Meyrick, 1923

Species of moth

Keiferia chloroneura is a moth in the family Gelechiidae. It was described by Edward Meyrick in 1923. It is found in Amazonas, Brazil.
