= Keiferia educata =

Scientific classification
- Kingdom: Animalia
- Phylum: Arthropoda
- Clade: Pancrustacea
- Class: Insecta
- Order: Lepidoptera
- Family: Gelechiidae
- Genus: Keiferia
- Species: K. educata

Binomial name
- Keiferia educata Povolný, 2004

Species of moth

Keiferia educata is a moth in the family Gelechiidae. It was described by Povolný in 2004. It is found in North America, where it has been recorded from California.
