= Solanum rigidum =

Conservation status
- Vulnerable (IUCN 3.1)

Scientific classification
- Kingdom: Plantae
- Clade: Tracheophytes
- Clade: Angiosperms
- Clade: Eudicots
- Clade: Asterids
- Order: Solanales
- Family: Solanaceae
- Genus: Solanum
- Species: S. rigidum

Binomial name
- Solanum rigidum Lam.

Synonyms
- Solanum latifolium Poir.

Species of plant

Solanum rigidum is a species of plant in the family Solanaceae. It goes by the common names olho de vaca or olho de boi.

Solanum rigidum is listed as vulnerable by the IUCN. It grows at sea levels at 100 meters.

== Genetics ==
The chromosome number for this species is currently not known.

== Reproduction ==
It is classified as andromonoecious. With a single or few hermaphroditic flowers located at the base of the inflorescence and distal flowers functioning as males.

== Disturbution ==
It is native to Cape Verde with it being present on 5 islands. According to the IUCN, the species seems to have disappeared from São Vicente and Boavista.

Collections of this species in found the Caribbean have most likely been introduced from the Cape Verde by slave ships.
