= Keiferia altisolani =

Scientific classification
- Domain: Eukaryota
- Kingdom: Animalia
- Phylum: Arthropoda
- Class: Insecta
- Order: Lepidoptera
- Family: Gelechiidae
- Genus: Keiferia
- Species: K. altisolani

Binomial name
- Keiferia altisolani (Kieffer, 1937)

Synonyms
- Gnorimoschema altisolani Kieffer, 1937; Tildenia altisolani

Species of moth

Keiferia altisolani is a moth in the family Gelechiidae. It was described by Kieffer in 1937. It is found in North America, where it has been recorded from California.

The length of the forewings is 5–6 mm.
