= Solanum agnewiorum =

Scientific classification
- Kingdom: Plantae
- Clade: Tracheophytes
- Clade: Angiosperms
- Clade: Eudicots
- Clade: Asterids
- Order: Solanales
- Family: Solanaceae
- Genus: Solanum
- Species: S. agnewiorum

Binomial name
- Solanum agnewiorum Voronts.

Species of plant

Solanum agnewiorum is a species of Solanum. The species is andromonoecious. It is native to Kenya and occurs in 4 locations.

Solanum agnewiorum is currently listed as endangered by the IUCN.
