= Bullnettle =

Bullnettle (also written "bull nettle", "Bull Nettle" or "bull-nettle") is a common name for several plants and may refer to:

- Cnidoscolus stimulosus (Spurge nettle), a plant of the spurge family (Euphorbiaceae)
- Cnidoscolus texanus (Texas bullnettle), another Euphorbiaceae
- Cnidoscolus urens
- Solanum carolinense (Carolina horsenettle), a plant of the nightshade family (Solanaceae)
- Solanum elaeagnifolium (Silver-leaved nightshade), another Solanaceae
