= Keiferia elmorei =

Scientific classification
- Domain: Eukaryota
- Kingdom: Animalia
- Phylum: Arthropoda
- Class: Insecta
- Order: Lepidoptera
- Family: Gelechiidae
- Genus: Keiferia
- Species: K. elmorei

Binomial name
- Keiferia elmorei (Keifer, 1936)

Synonyms
- Gnorimoshema elmorei Keifer, 1936

Species of moth

Keiferia elmorei is a moth in the family Gelechiidae. It was described by Keifer in 1936. It is found in North America, where it has been recorded from California.

The length of the forewings is 4-5.9 mm for males and 3.4-5.3 mm for females.

The larvae feed on Solanum species. They mine the leaves of their host plant.
