= Keiferia subtilis =

Scientific classification
- Kingdom: Animalia
- Phylum: Arthropoda
- Clade: Pancrustacea
- Class: Insecta
- Order: Lepidoptera
- Family: Gelechiidae
- Genus: Keiferia
- Species: K. subtilis

Binomial name
- Keiferia subtilis Povolný, 1984

Species of moth

Keiferia subtilis is a moth in the family Gelechiidae. It was described by Povolný in 1984. It is found in Venezuela.
