= Keiferia vorax =

Scientific classification
- Domain: Eukaryota
- Kingdom: Animalia
- Phylum: Arthropoda
- Class: Insecta
- Order: Lepidoptera
- Family: Gelechiidae
- Genus: Keiferia
- Species: K. vorax

Binomial name
- Keiferia vorax (Meyrick, 1939)

Synonyms
- Phthorimaea vorax Meyrick, 1939

Species of moth

Keiferia vorax is a moth in the family Gelechiidae. It was described by Edward Meyrick in 1939. It is found in Argentina.
