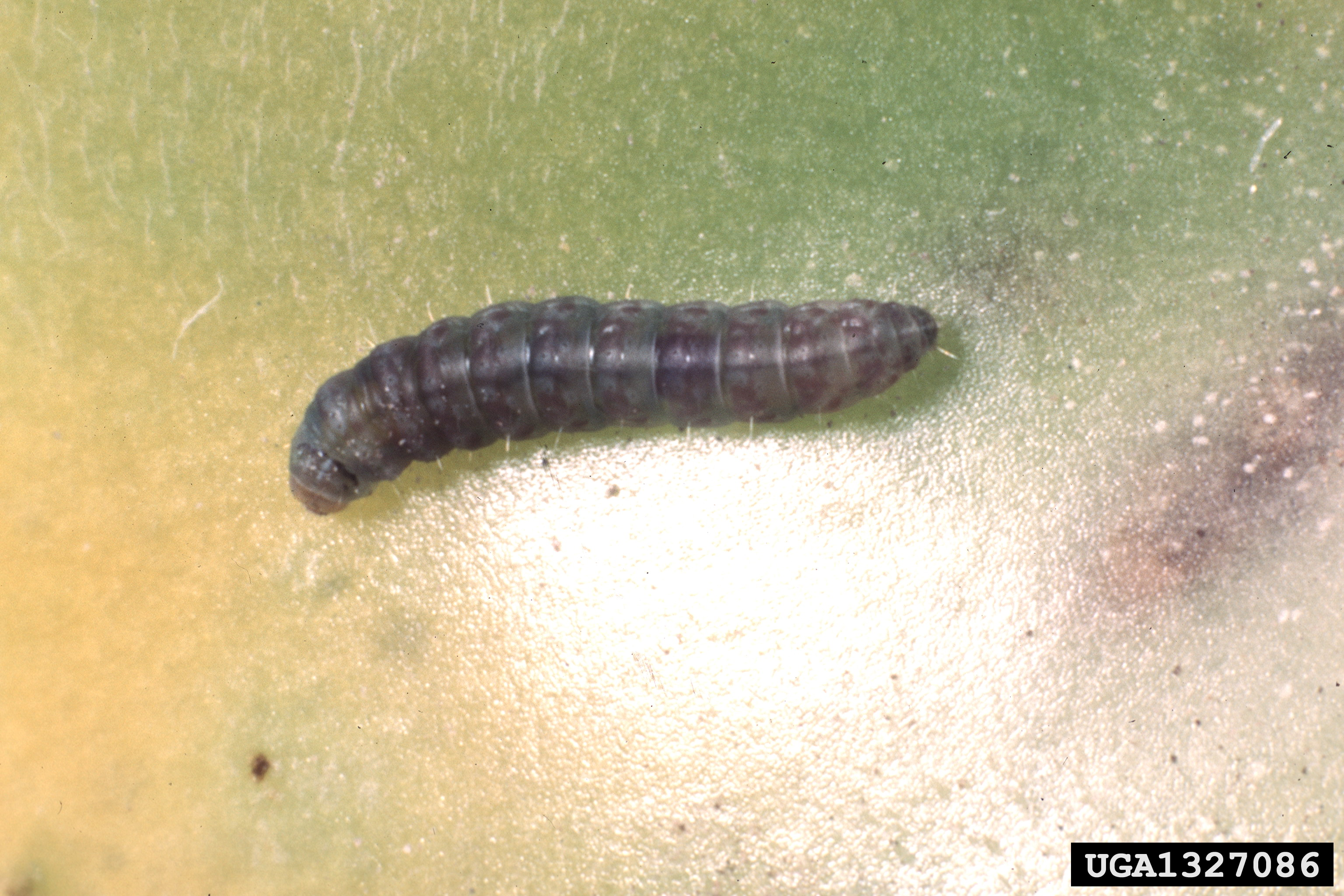
- Keiferia lycopersicella (caterpillar)

Scientific classification
- Kingdom: Animalia
- Phylum: Arthropoda
- Class: Insecta
- Order: Lepidoptera
- Family: Gelechiidae
- Subfamily: Gelechiinae
- Tribe: Gnorimoschemini
- Genus: Keiferia; Busck, 1939

Synonyms
- Tildenia Povolný, 1967

= Keiferia =

Genus of moths

Keiferia is a genus of moths in the family Gelechiidae.

== Species ==
- Keiferia altisolani (Kieffer, 1937)
- Keiferia azapaensis Vargas, 2025
- Keiferia brunnea Povolný, 1973
- Keiferia chloroneura (Meyrick, 1923)
- Keiferia colombiana Povolný, 1975
- Keiferia dalibori King & Montesinos, 2012
- Keiferia educata Povolný, 2004
- Keiferia elmorei (Keifer, 1936)
- Keiferia funebrella Povolný, 1984
- Keiferia georgei (Hodges, 1985)
- Keiferia glochinella (Zeller, 1873)
- Keiferia griseofusca Povolný, 1984
- Keiferia gudmannella (Walsingham, 1897)
- Keiferia inconspicuella (Murtfeldt, 1883)
- Keiferia lobata Povolný, 1990
- Keiferia lycopersicella (Walsingham, 1897)
- Keiferia powelli Povolný, 2004
- Keiferia propria Povolný, 1990
- Keiferia rusposoria Povolný, 1970
- Keiferia subtilis Povolný, 1984
- Keiferia vitalis Povolný, 1990
- Keiferia vorax (Meyrick, 1939)
