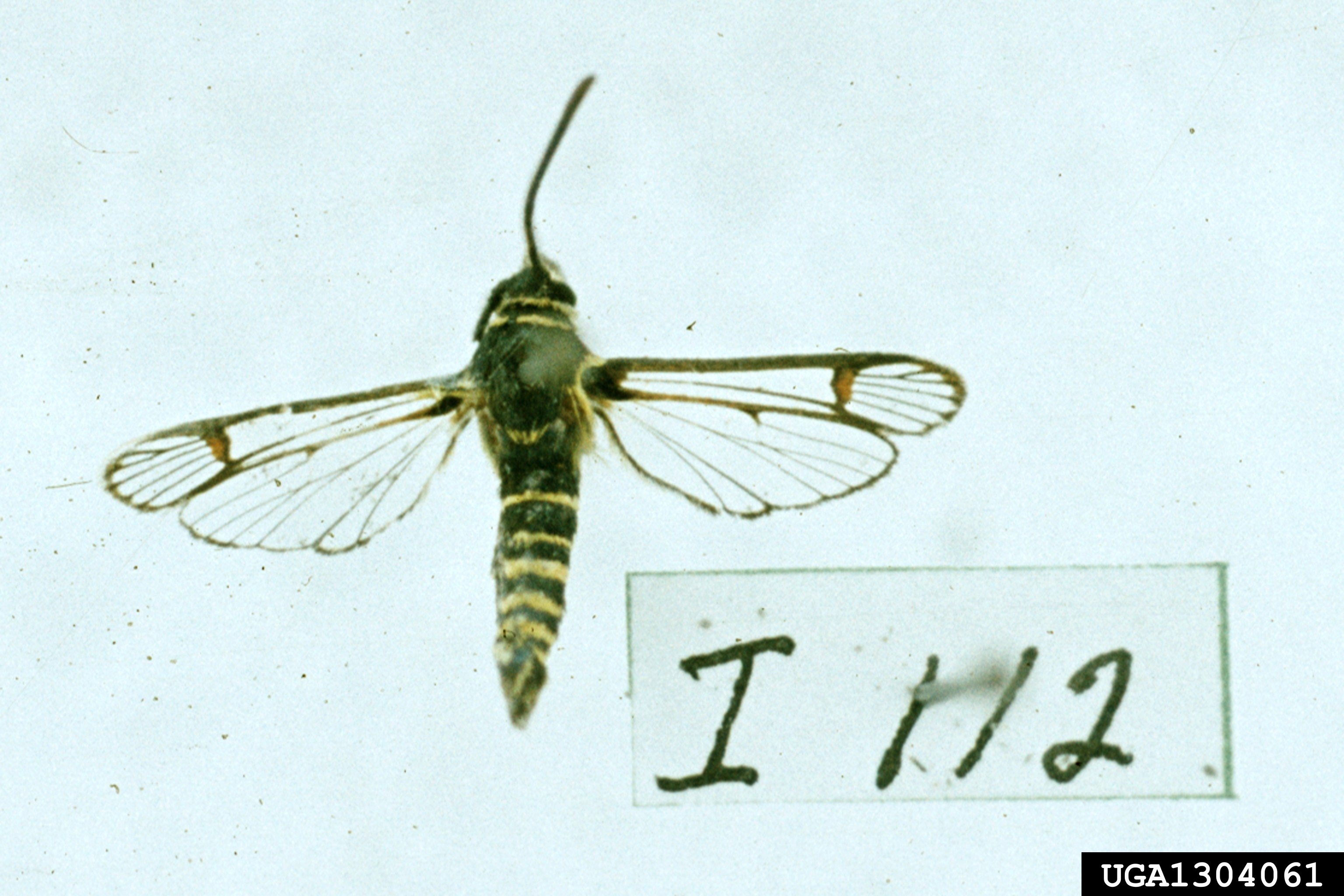

Scientific classification
- Kingdom: Animalia
- Phylum: Arthropoda
- Clade: Pancrustacea
- Class: Insecta
- Order: Lepidoptera
- Family: Sesiidae
- Genus: Synanthedon
- Species: S. rileyana

Binomial name
- Synanthedon rileyana (Edwards, 1881)

Synonyms
- Albuna rileyana Edwards, 1881; Aegeria brunneipennis Edwards, 1881; Aegeria hyperici Edwards, 1881; Carmenta austini Engelhardt, 1946

= Synanthedon rileyana =

Species of moth

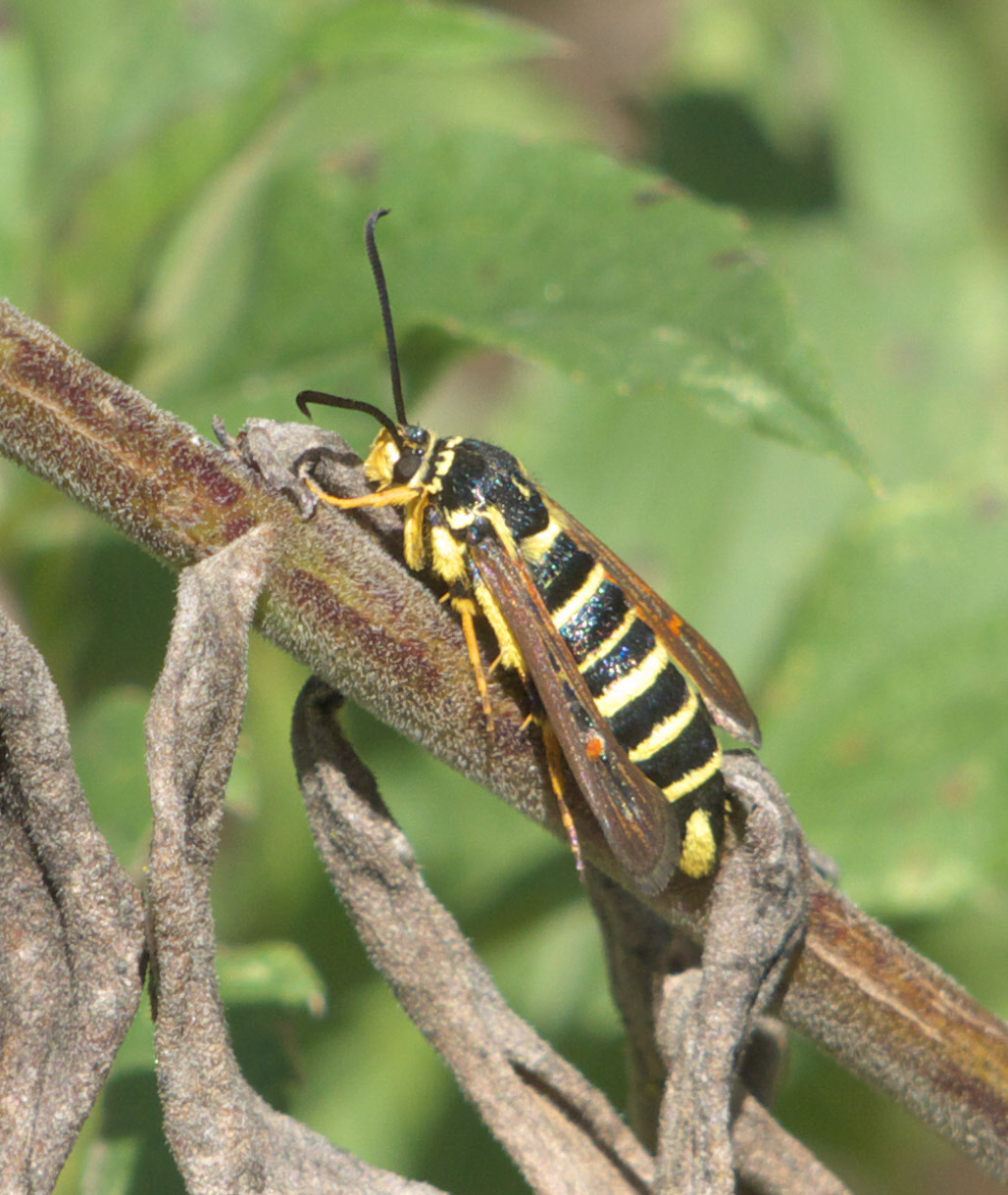
Synanthedon rileyana, Riley's clearwing

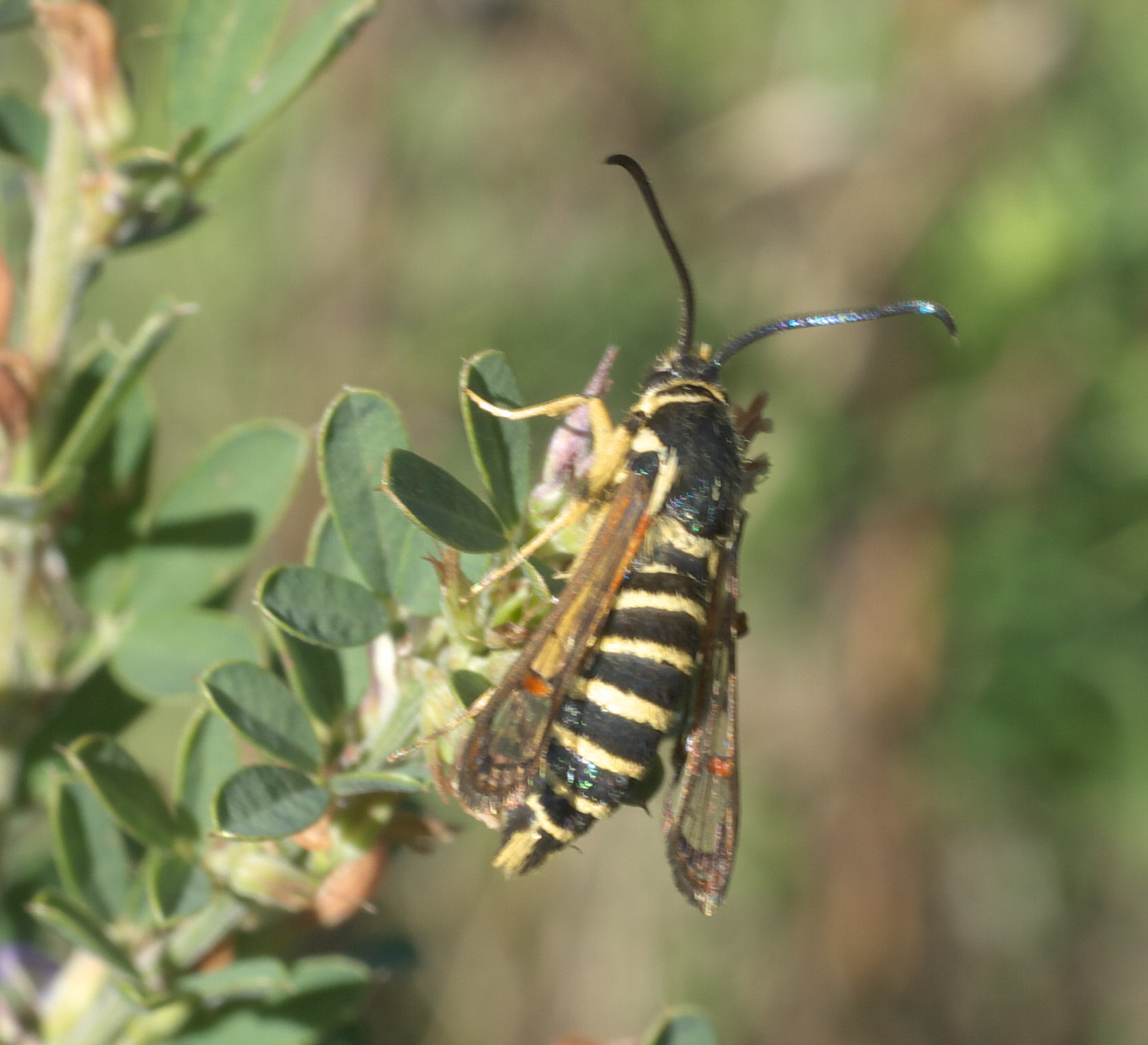
Synanthedon rileyana, Riley's clearwing

Synanthedon rileyana, the horsenettle borer or Riley's clearwing moth, is a moth of the family Sesiidae. It is found in the United States, including Arkansas, Arizona, Missouri, Oklahoma, North Carolina and Pennsylvania.

The wingspan is 20–23 mm (0.79–0.91 in). Adults are on wing from May to September. There are several generations per year.

The larvae feed on Solanum carolinense.
