= Keiferia rusposoria =

Scientific classification
- Kingdom: Animalia
- Phylum: Arthropoda
- Clade: Pancrustacea
- Class: Insecta
- Order: Lepidoptera
- Family: Gelechiidae
- Genus: Keiferia
- Species: K. rusposoria

Binomial name
- Keiferia rusposoria Povolný, 1970

Species of moth

Keiferia rusposoria is a moth in the family Gelechiidae. It was described by Povolný in 1970. It is found in the West Indies, where it has been recorded from Grenada.
