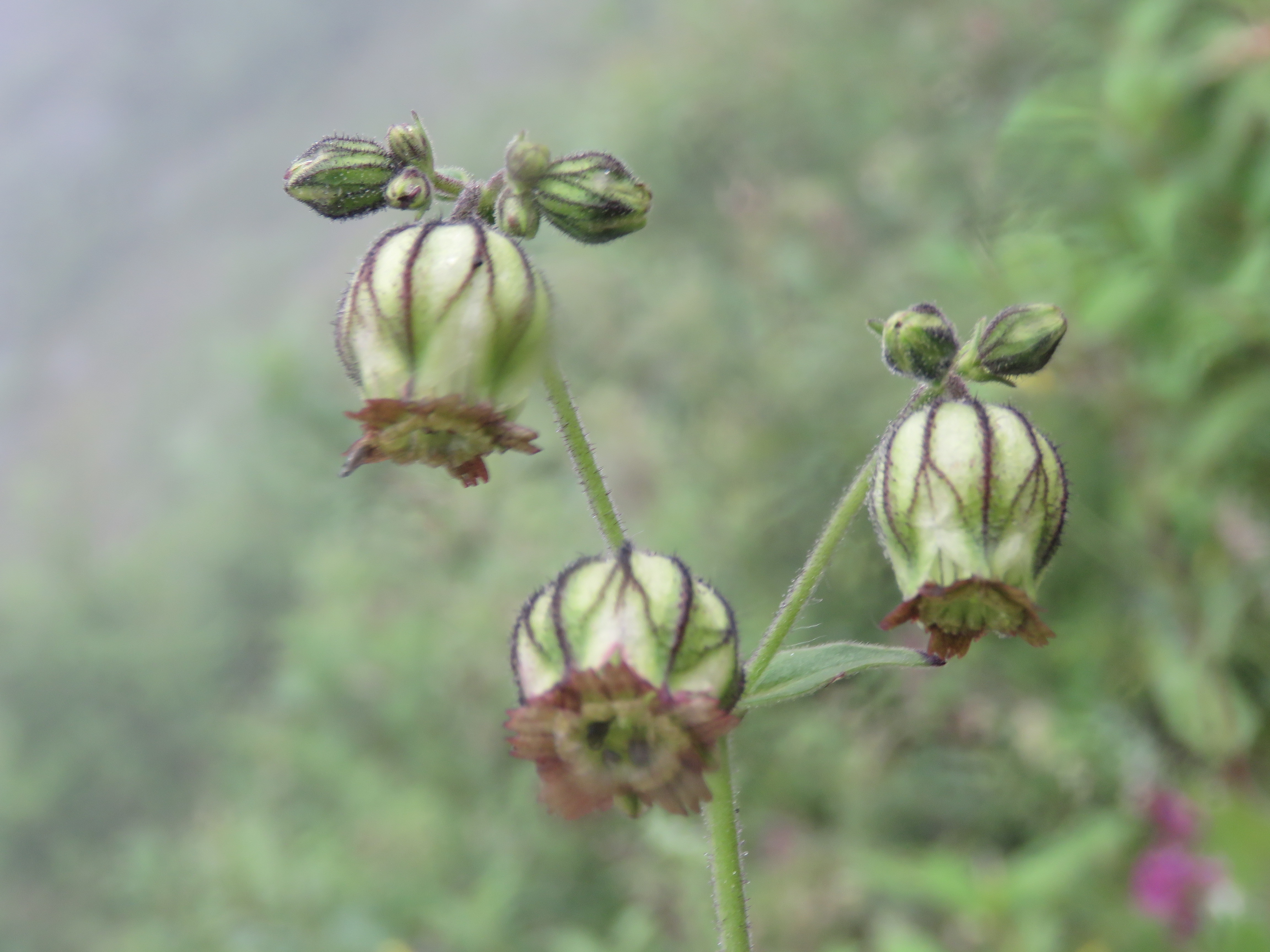
- Flowers

Scientific classification
- Kingdom: Plantae
- Clade: Tracheophytes
- Clade: Angiosperms
- Clade: Eudicots
- Order: Caryophyllales
- Family: Caryophyllaceae
- Genus: Silene
- Species: S. indica

Binomial name
- Silene indica Roxb. ex Otth

Synonyms
- List: Lychnis bhutanica W.W.Sm.; Lychnis ciliata Wall.; Lychnis eriostemon Wall.; Lychnis indica (Roxb. ex Otth) Benth.; Lychnis nutans Benth.; Melandrium fimbriatum Walp.; Melandrium indicum (Roxb. ex Otth) Walp.; Silene bhutanica (W.W.Sm.) Majumdar; Silene thomsonii Majumdar

= Silene indica =

Species of flowering plant

Silene indica, the Indian campion, is a species of flowering plant in the family Caryophyllaceae, native to northern Pakistan, the Himalayas, and southern Tibet. It typically grows at elevations of 2,300 to 3,900 m (7,500 to 12,800 ft).

== Subtaxa ==
The following varieties are accepted:

- Silene indica var. bhutanica (W.W.Sm.) Bocquet
- Silene indica var. indica
