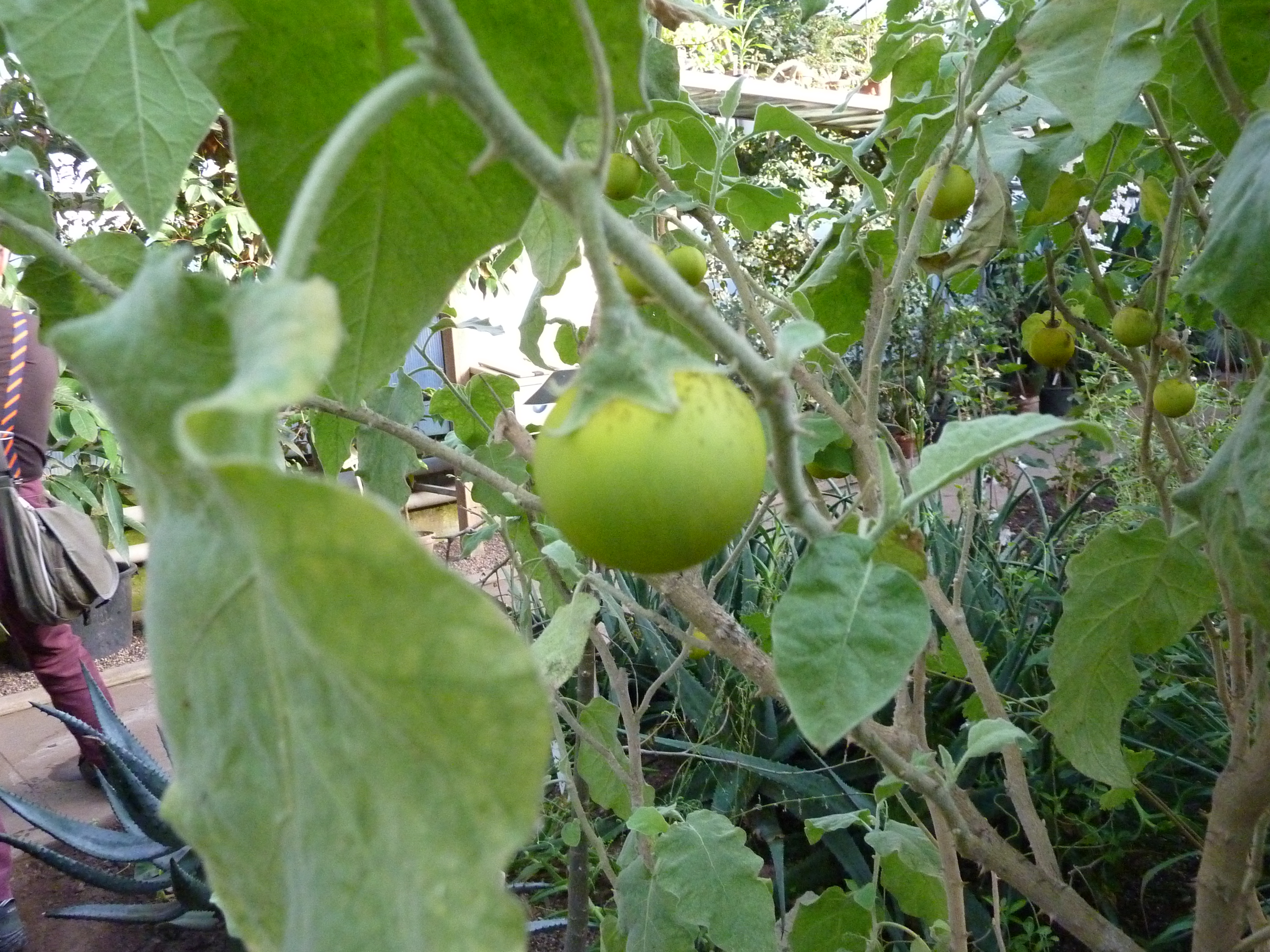

Scientific classification
- Kingdom: Plantae
- Clade: Tracheophytes
- Clade: Angiosperms
- Clade: Eudicots
- Clade: Asterids
- Order: Solanales
- Family: Solanaceae
- Genus: Solanum
- Subgenus: Solanum subg. Leptostemonum
- Section: Solanum sect. Melongena
- Species: S. incanum

Binomial name
- Solanum incanum L.

Synonyms
- Solanum coagulans var. griseum Dunal; Solanum floccosistellatum Bitter; Solanum hierochuntinum Dunal; Solanum hierochuntinum var. lanuginosum Dunal; Solanum incanum var. brevitomentosum Bitter; Solanum incanum subsp. horridescens Bitter; Solanum incanum var. integrascens Bitter; Solanum incanum var. kavirondoense Bitter; Solanum incanum var. pluribaccatum Bitter; Solanum incanum subsp. schoanum Bitter; Solanum incanum var. unguiculatum (A.Rich.) Abedin, Al-Yahya, Chaudhary & J.S.Mossa; Solanum sanctum L., nom. superfl.; Solanum undulatum Poir.; Solanum unguiculatum A.Rich.

= Solanum incanum =

Species of flowering plant

Solanum incanum is a species of nightshade, a flowering plant in the family Solanaceae. It is native to East Africa, West Africa, the Middle East, and eastwards to India. The species was introduced to Taiwan and Vietnam.

Common names include thorn apple, bitter apple, bitterball and bitter tomato It may be confused with the similar S. linnaeanum where their ranges overlap in Africa. In ancient India, Solanum incanum was domesticated into the eggplant, Solanum melongena.

== Gallery ==
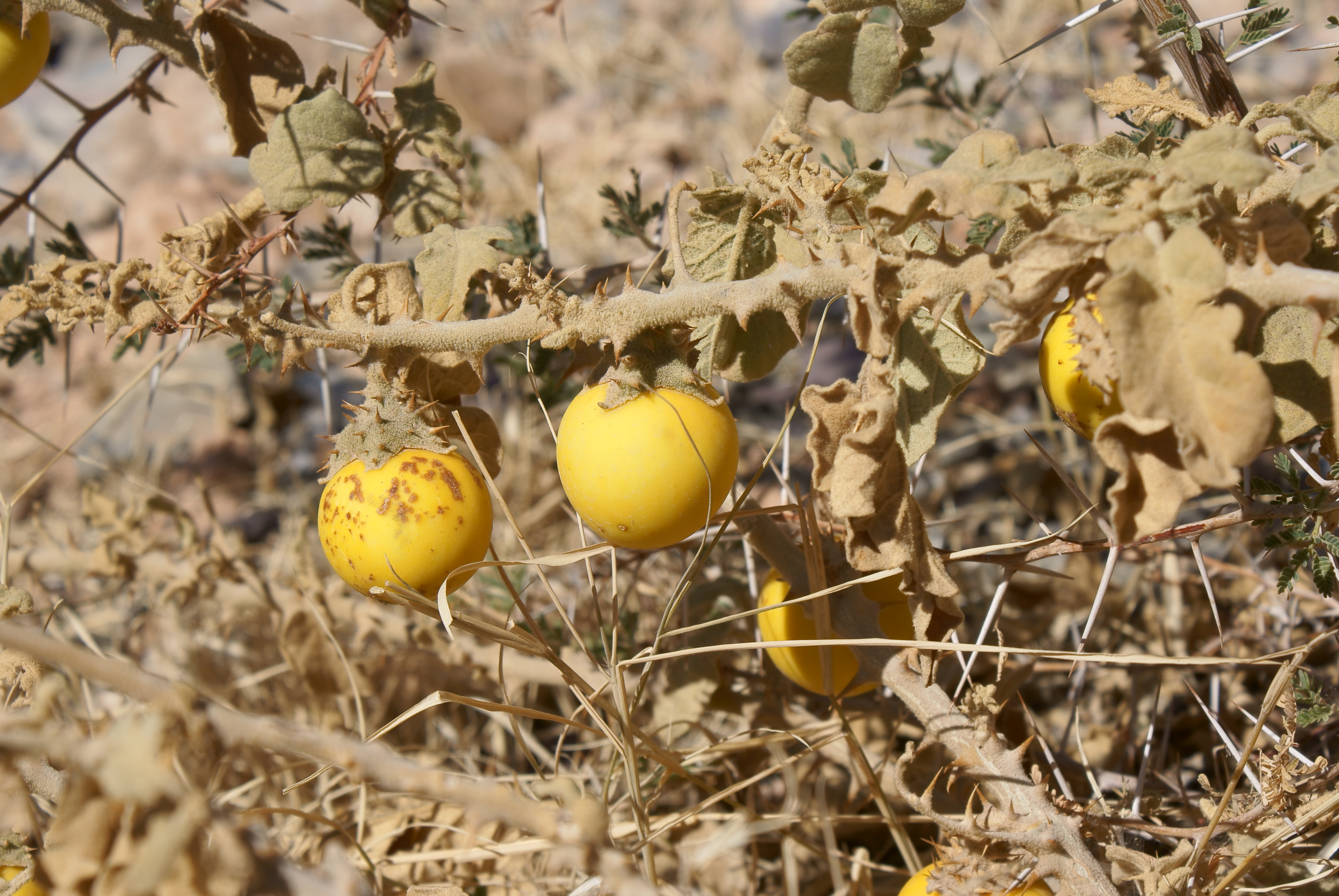

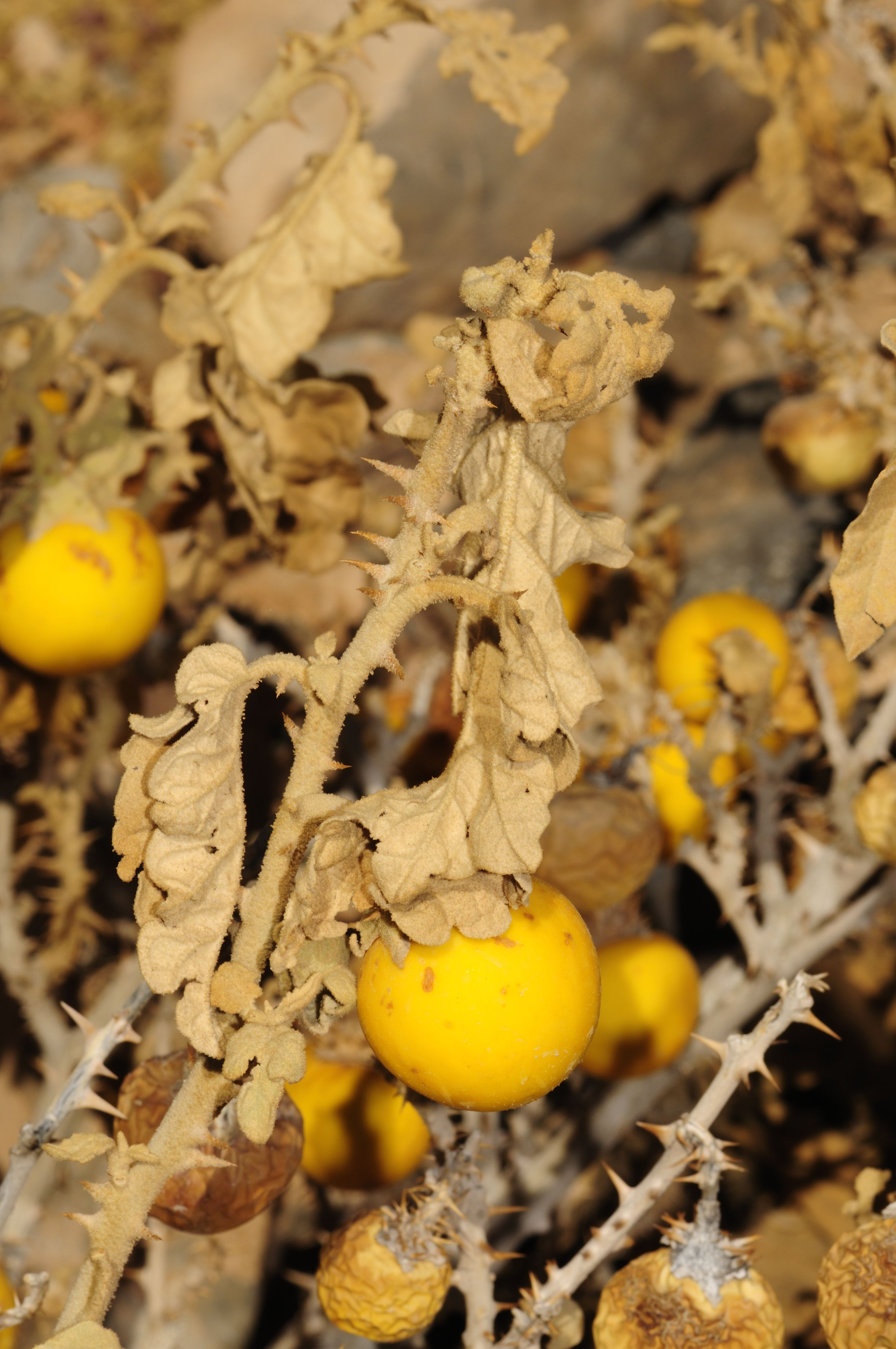

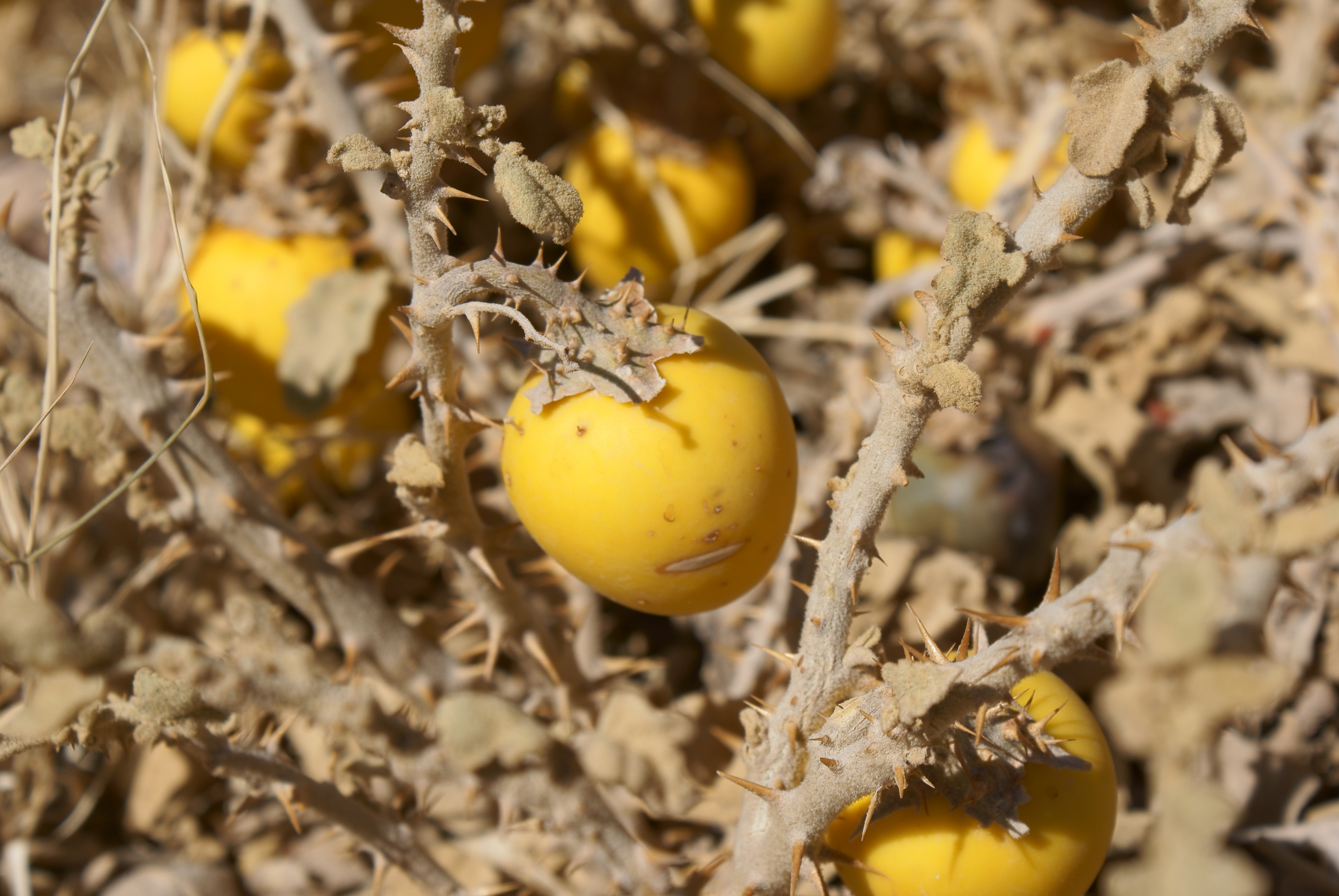

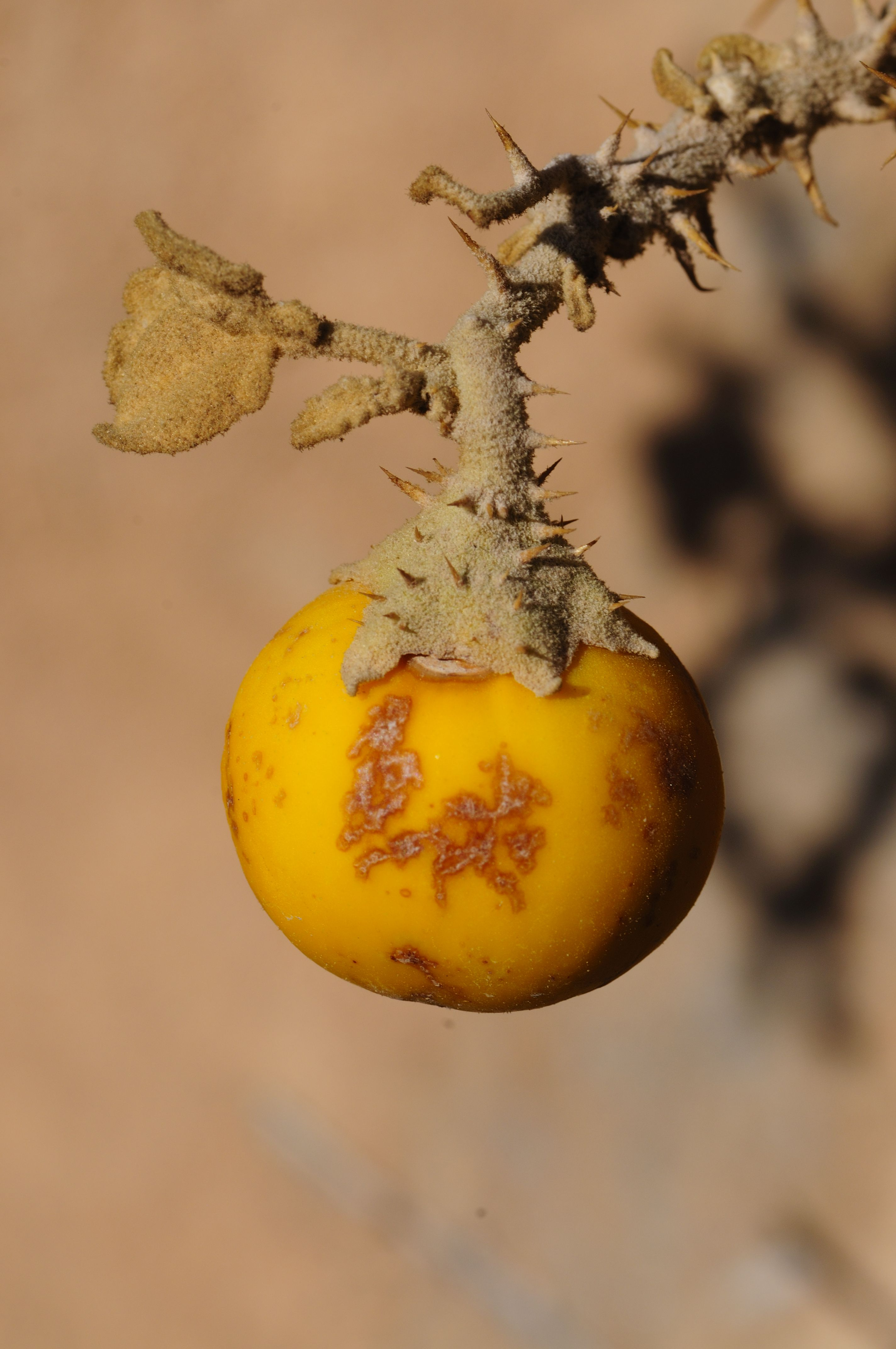

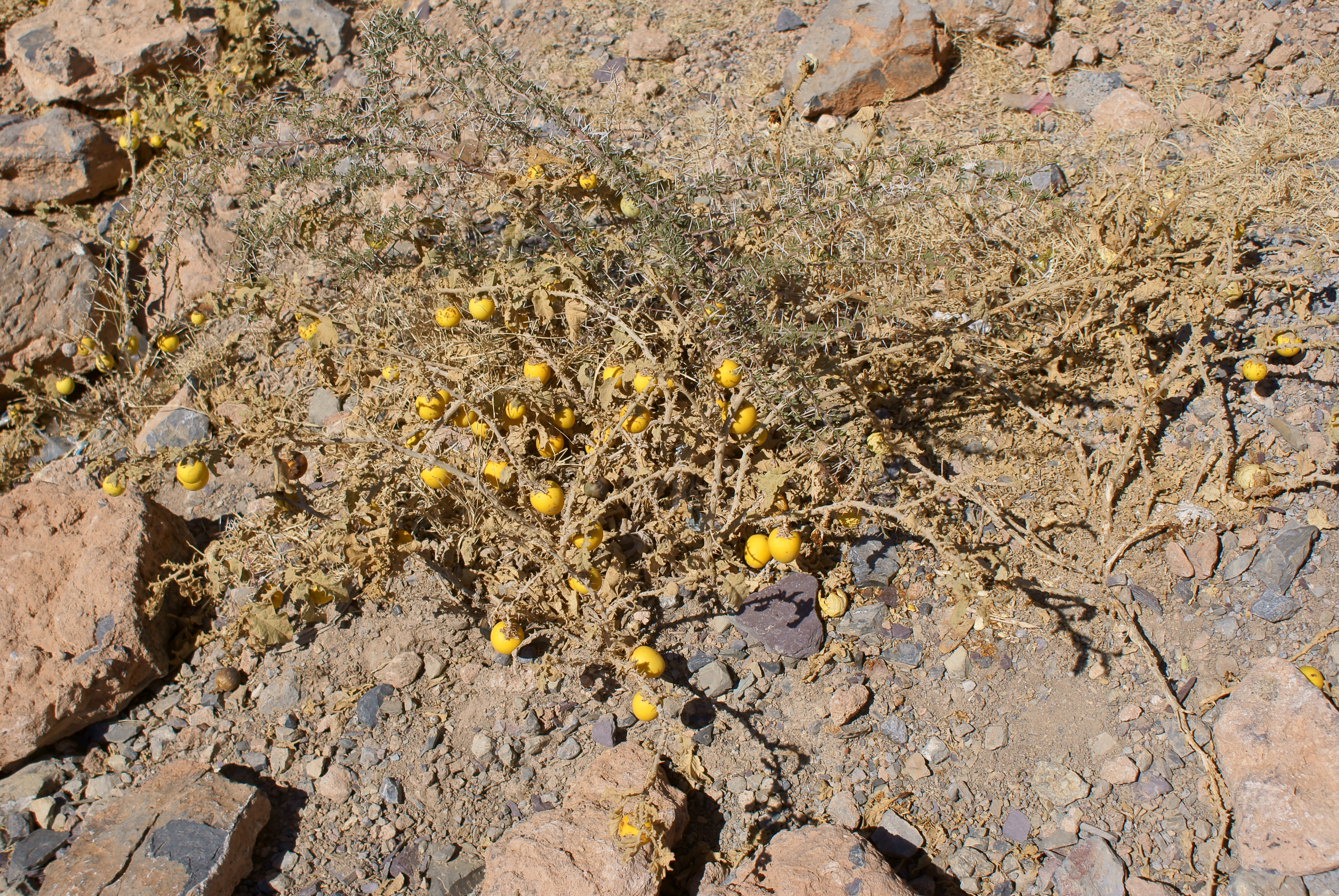

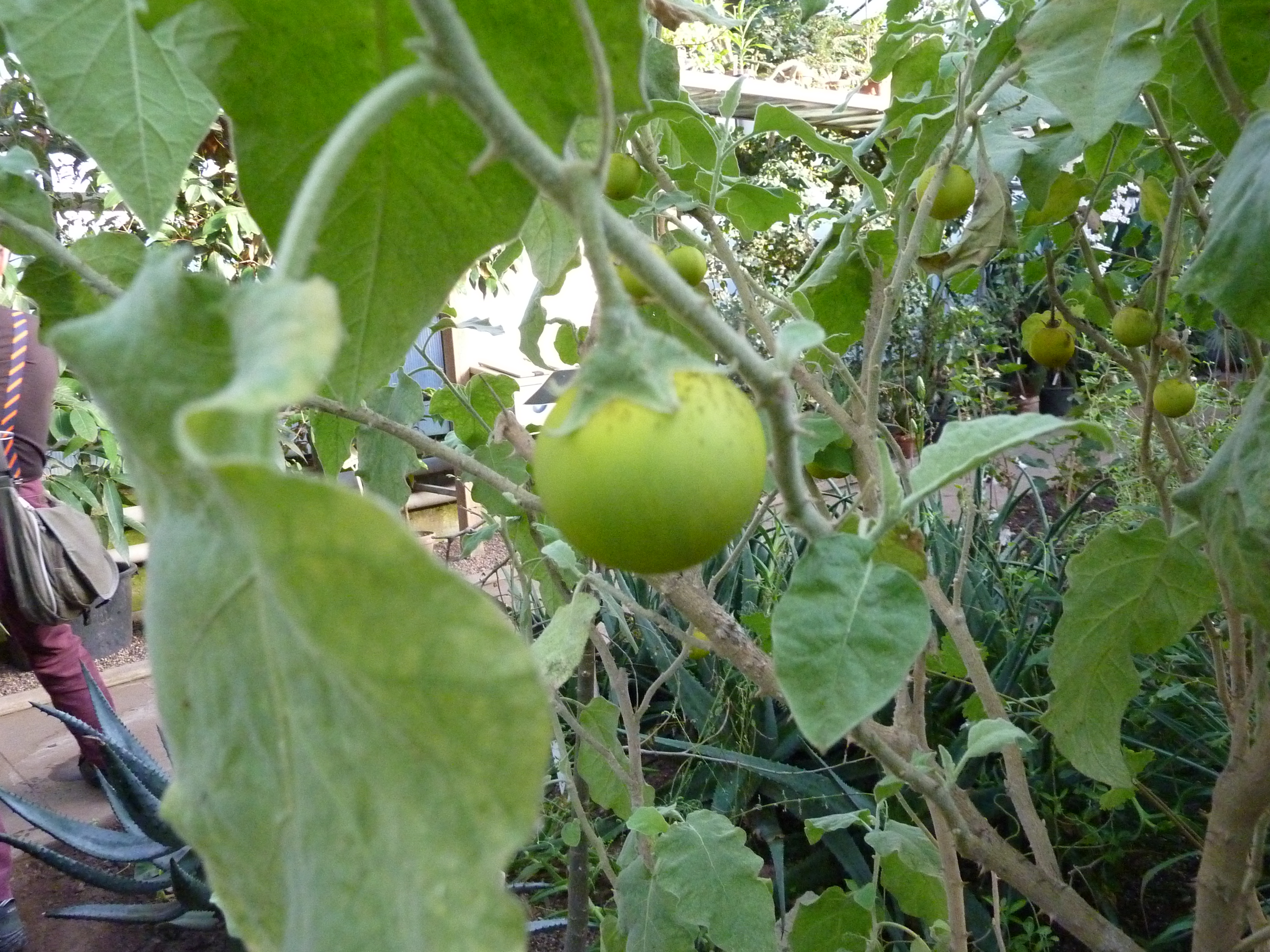
