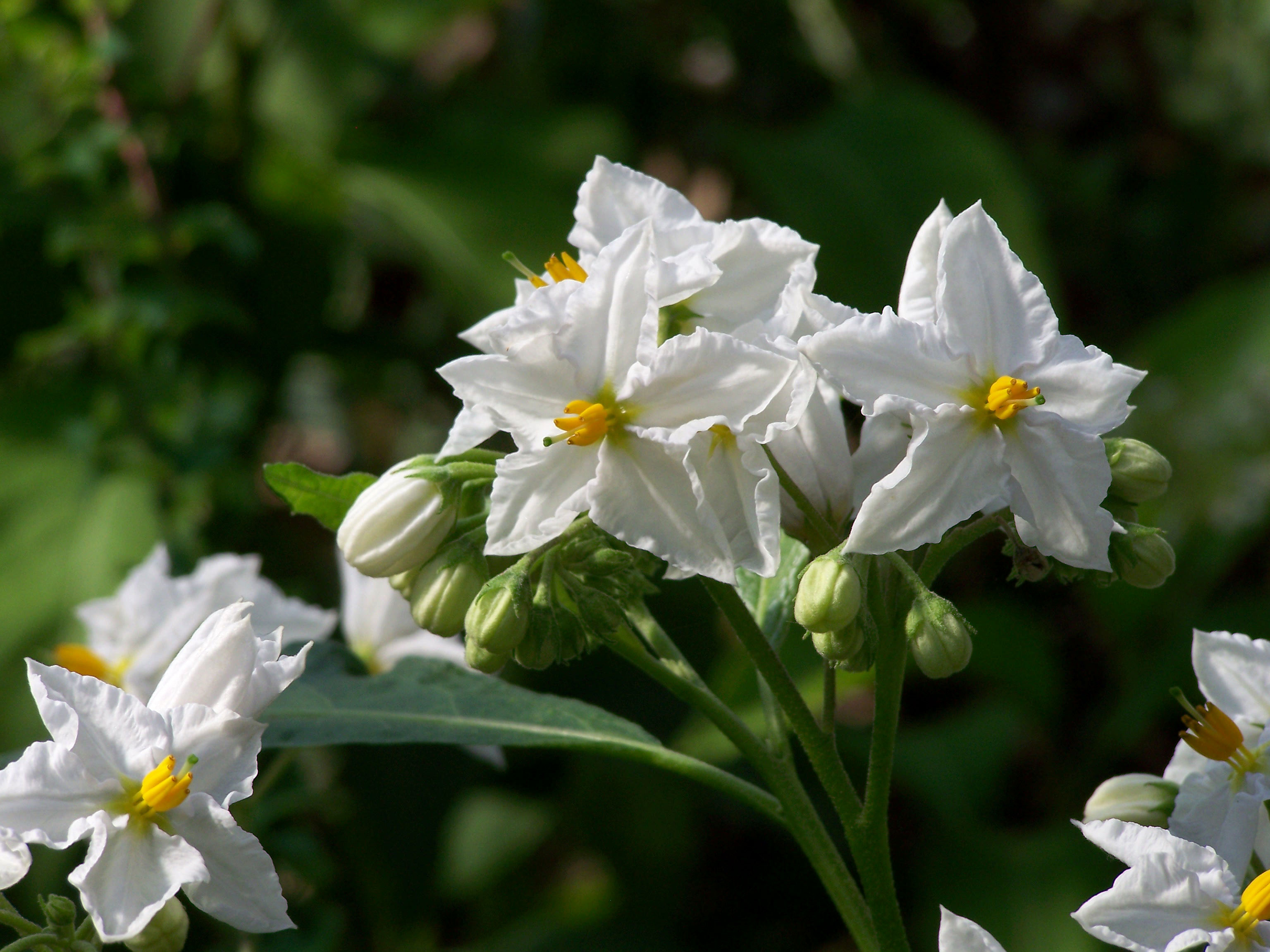

Scientific classification
- Kingdom: Plantae
- Clade: Tracheophytes
- Clade: Angiosperms
- Clade: Eudicots
- Clade: Asterids
- Order: Solanales
- Family: Solanaceae
- Genus: Solanum
- Species: S. bonariense

Binomial name
- Solanum bonariense L.

Synonyms
- List: Solanum arborescens Moench; Solanum asterigerum Bertol.; Solanum astroites J.Jacq.; Solanum baccatum Steud.; Solanum bonariense f. typicum Hassl.; Solanum excelsum Salisb.; Solanum fastigiatum Willd.; Solanum grandiflorum Steud.; Solanum regnelii Hiern; Solanum saponaceum var. uruguense Griseb.

= Solanum bonariense =

Species of flowering plant

Solanum bonariense is a species of plant in the nightshade family. It is a shrub native to northeastern Argentina, southeastern and southern Brazil, and Uruguay.

A Solanum bonariense plant

Flowers of a Solanum bonariense plant

Fruits of a Solanum bonariense plant
