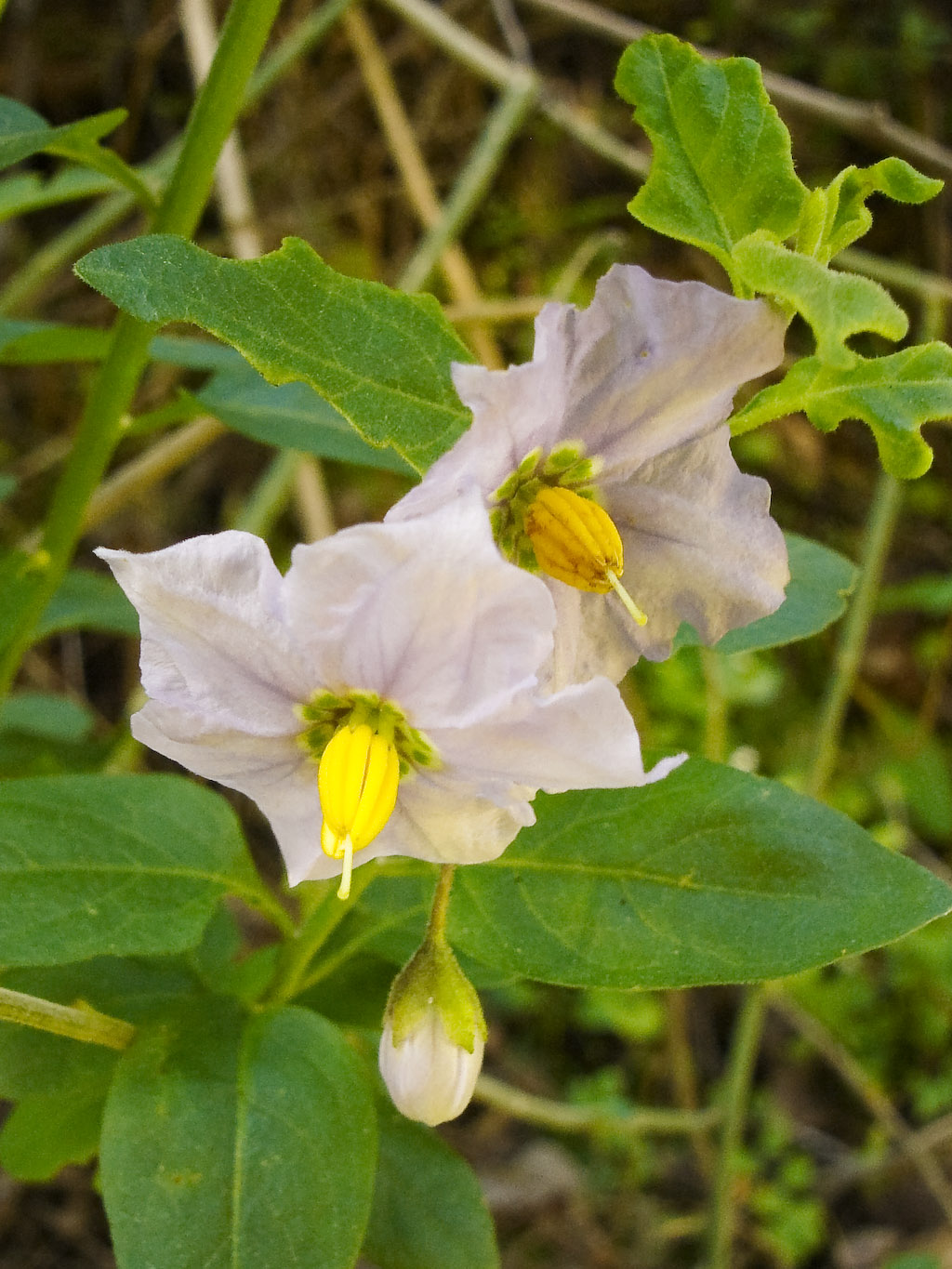

Scientific classification
- Kingdom: Plantae
- Clade: Tracheophytes
- Clade: Angiosperms
- Clade: Eudicots
- Clade: Asterids
- Order: Solanales
- Family: Solanaceae
- Genus: Solanum
- Species: S. umbelliferum

Binomial name
- Solanum umbelliferum Eschsch.

= Solanum umbelliferum =

Species of flowering plant

Solanum umbelliferum is a species of nightshade known commonly as bluewitch nightshade, or bluewitch. It can be found in chaparral habitat and low-elevation oak woodlands in California and parts of Baja California and Arizona. It is a small perennial herb or subshrub with dark gray-green oval-shaped leaves on hairy green stems that grow to a maximum height of one meter. It has bright purple or blue frilly flowers with thick yellow anthers at the center. The flowers close into spherical buds overnight. It bears small round green fruits which turn purple when ripe and resemble tiny eggplants.

It is a tough shrub which can grow in rocky and clay soils and springs up in areas recovering from wildfires or other disturbances. Like most other members of genus Solanum, S. umbelliferum contains toxic alkaloids.
