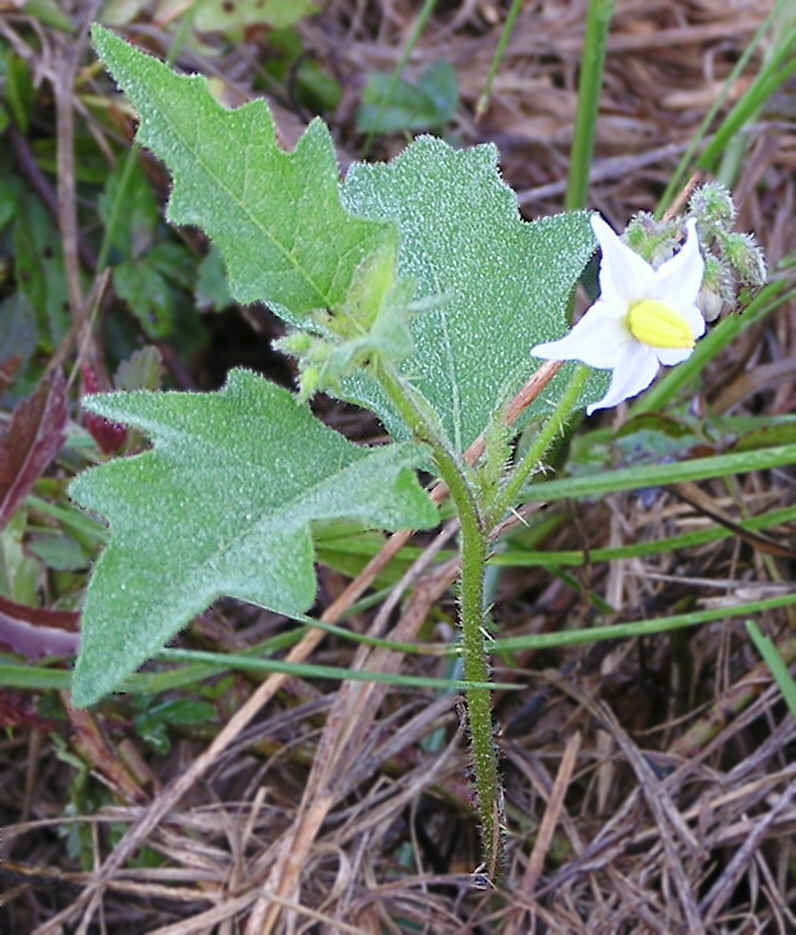
- Young plant showing leaves and flowers. Notice the prickles on the stem.

Conservation status
- Secure (NatureServe)

Scientific classification
- Kingdom: Plantae
- Clade: Embryophytes
- Clade: Tracheophytes
- Clade: Spermatophytes
- Clade: Angiosperms
- Clade: Eudicots
- Clade: Asterids
- Order: Solanales
- Family: Solanaceae
- Genus: Solanum
- Species: S. carolinense

Binomial name
- Solanum carolinense L.

Synonyms
- Synonymy: Solanum carolinense f. albiflorum (Kuntze) Benke; Solanum carolinense var. albiflorum Kuntze; Solanum carolinense var. floridanum (Dunal) Chapm.; Solanum carolinense var. pohlianum Dunal; Solanum floridanum Raf. 1840; Solanum floridanum Shuttlew. ex Dunal 1852; Solanum godfreyi Shinners; Solanum pleei Dunal

= Solanum carolinense =

Carolina horsenettle

Species of plant

Solanum carolinense, the Carolina horsenettle, is not a true nettle, but a member of the Solanaceae, or nightshade family. It is a perennial herbaceous plant, native to the southeastern United States, though its range has expanded throughout much of temperate North America. The plant is considered to be invasive in parts of Europe, Asia, Africa and Australia. The stem and undersides of larger leaf veins are covered with prickles.

"Horsenettle" is also written "horse nettle" or "horse-nettle", though USDA publications usually use the one-word form. Though there are other horsenettle nightshades, S. carolinense is the species most commonly called "the horsenettle". Other common names include radical weed, sand brier or briar, bull nettle, tread-softly, Solanum mammosum ("apple of Sodom"), devil's tomato and wild tomato.

== Description ==
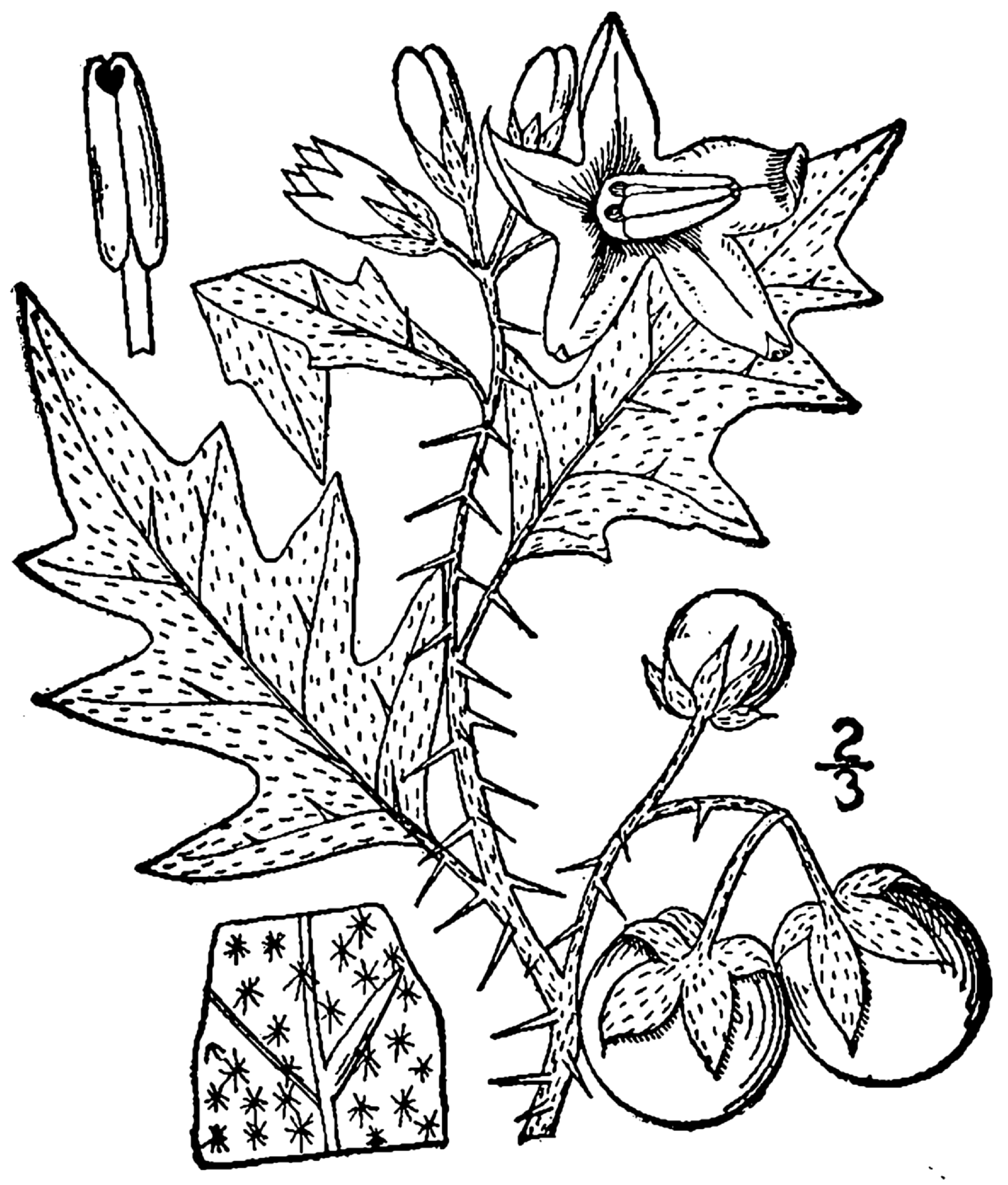
Illustration of Carolina Horsenettle from a 1913 field guide

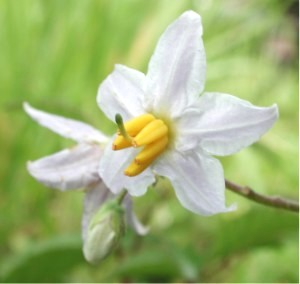
Flowers

The leaves are alternate, elliptic-oblong to oval, 6 to 11 centimetres (2 1/2 to 4 1/2 inches) long, and each is irregularly lobed or coarsely toothed. Both surfaces are covered with fine hairs. The leaves smell like potatoes when crushed. The flowers have five petals and are usually white or purple with yellow centers, though there is a blue variant that resembles the tomato flower. The fruits are berries that resemble tomatoes. The immature fruit is dark green with light green stripes, turning yellow and wrinkled as it matures. Each fruit contains around 60 seeds. It flowers throughout the summer, from April to October (in the northern hemisphere). The plant grows to 90 cm (3 ft) tall, is perennial, and spreads by both seeds and underground rhizome. Stems of older plants are woody.

== Toxicity ==
Many parts of the plant have historically been used to create medicines to treat various conditions. It was listed in the United States National Formulary from 1916 to 1936 for use by pharmacists. However all parts of the plant, including its tomato-like fruit, contain toxins in varying degrees due to the presence of solanine glycoalkaloids which is a toxic alkaloid and one of the plant's natural defenses. While ingesting any part of the plant can cause fever, headache, scratchy throat, nausea, vomiting, and diarrhea, ingesting the fruit can cause abdominal pain, circulatory and respiratory depression, or even death.

== Ecology ==
=== Habitat ===
Solanum carolinense can be found growing in pastures, roadsides, railroad margins, and in disturbed areas and waste ground. They can grow to about 1 m (3 ft 3 in) tall, but are typically shorter, existing as subshrubs. They prefer full sun, and can tolerate both wet or dry conditions. They grow readily in sandy or loamy soils, and may also tolerate a wide range of soil types. They are most vigorous and most likely to become weedy or aggressive on disturbed sites, but can also be found in less disturbed habitats.

=== Faunal associations and diseases ===
Bumble bees pollinate the flowers of Solanum carolinense.

At least thirty-two insects, as well as the meadow vole Microtus pennsylvanicus, have been recorded feeding on this species in Virginia alone. The caterpillars of the Synanthedon rileyana moth and the Manduca sexta (tobacco hornworm) moth feed on the plant. Manduca sexta moths prefer inbred plants to outbred plants. Leptinotarsa juncta (the false potato beetle) specializes on this plant, and Epitrix fuscula (the eggplant flea beetle) eats it as well. These two beetles are its two primary herbivores, and can reduce fruit production by as much as 75% relative to plants protected from all insects. Anthonomus nigrinus (the potato bud weevil) feeds on the flowers, and Trichobaris trinotata (the potato stalk borer) bores into the stems. This plant is also eaten by Leptinotarsa decemlineata (the Colorado potato beetle) and has been recorded as being eaten at very low rates by pupae of an unidentified species of the family Gelechiidae.

False potato beetle larvae consuming horsenettle. The leaves contain embedded leaf prickles that extend through the leaf protecting it from many herbivores.

Parasitic nematodes of the genus Pratylenchus have been found on lesions on its roots, however causing little damage. The fungus Rhizoctonia solani was found causing root rot, particularly under wet conditions in plants damaged by trampling. The plant is also affected by powdery mildew species such as Podosphaera solanacearum.

Fruits are eaten by a variety of native animals, including ring-necked pheasant, bobwhite, wild turkey, and striped skunk. Most mammals avoid eating the stems and leaves due to both the spines and toxicity of the plant.

== Weed ==
Carolina horsenettle is considered a noxious weed in one US state (Alaska). It can spread vegetatively by underground rhizomes as well as by seed. It is resistant to many postemergent herbicides and somewhat resistant to broad-spectrum herbicides such as glyphosate and 2,4-D. In fact, herbicide use often selects for horsenettle by removing competing weeds. It is an especially despised weed by gardeners who hand-weed, as the prickles tend to penetrate the skin and then break off when the plant is grasped. The deep root also makes it difficult to remove.

== Gallery ==
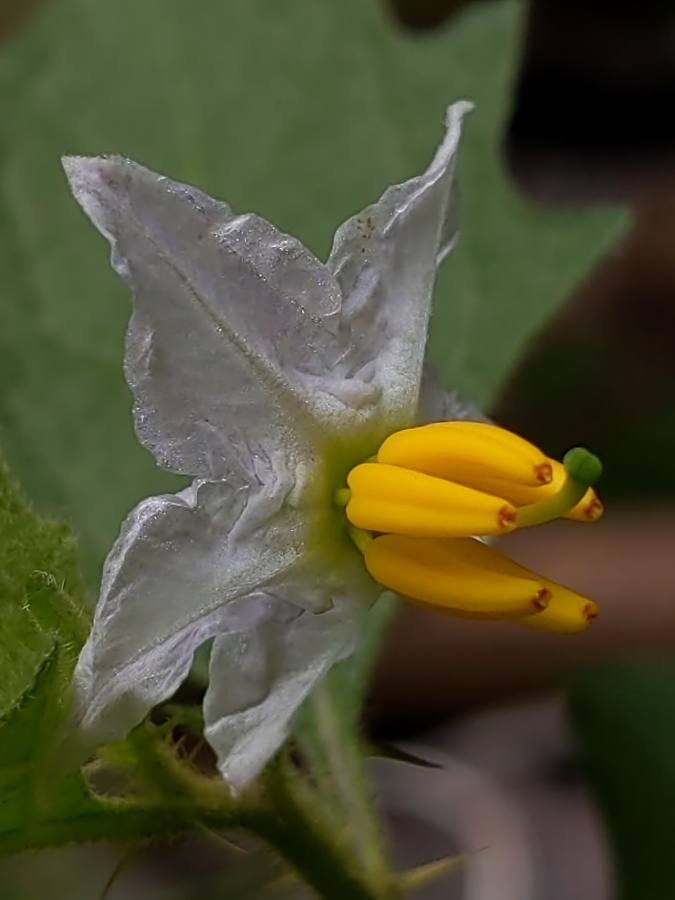
Flower

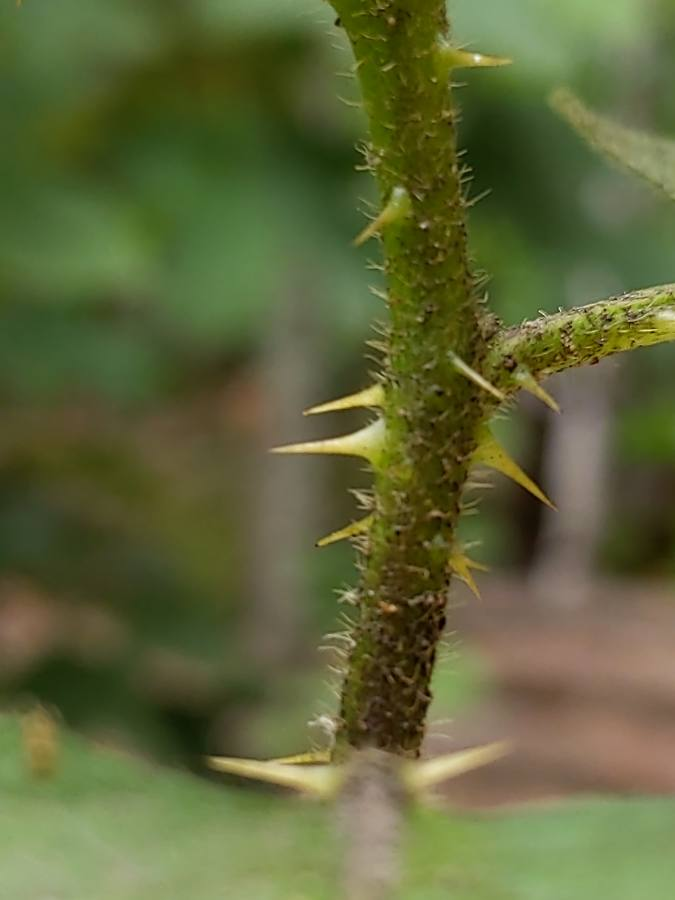
Stem with prickles

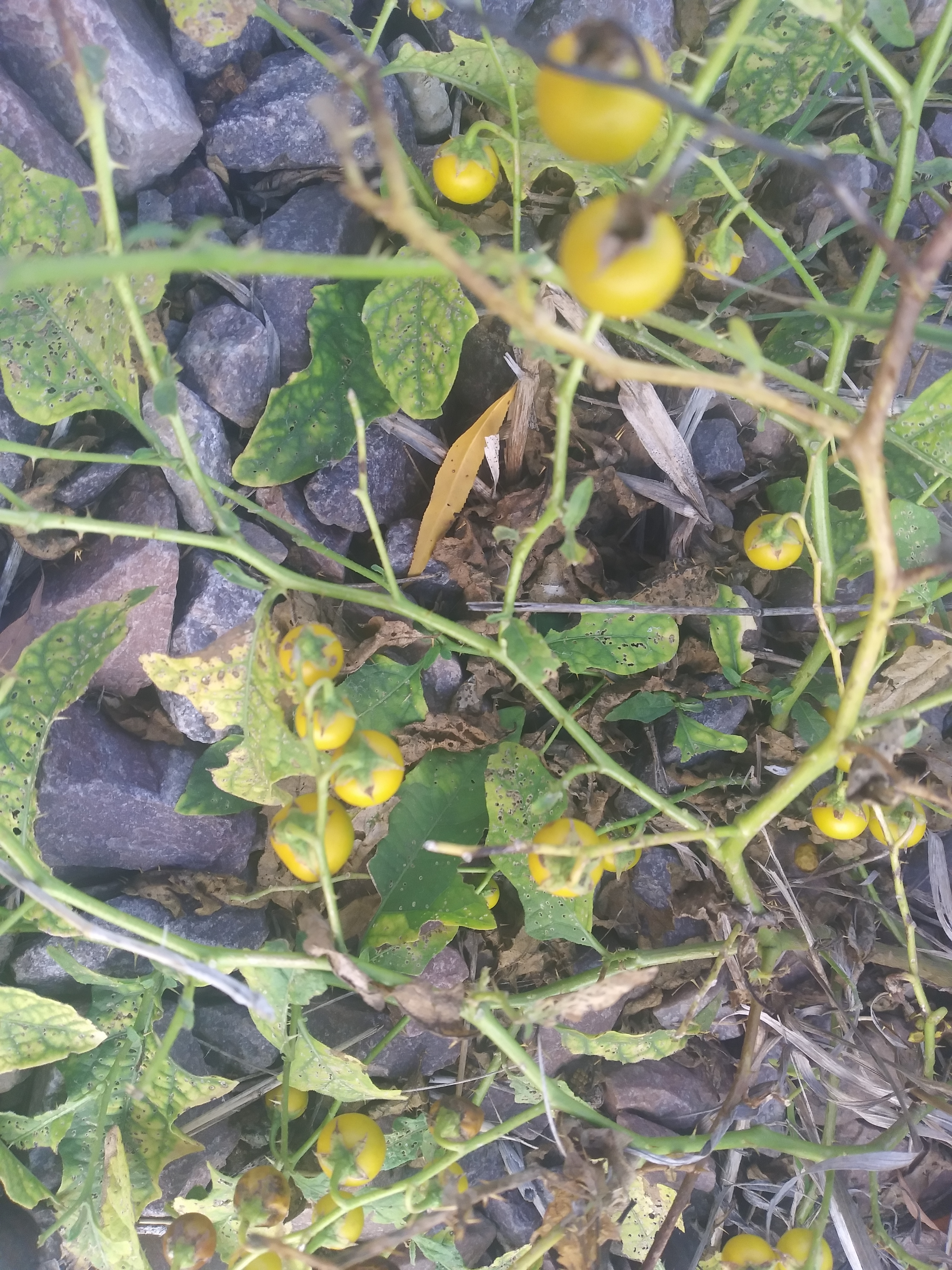
Large cluster of ripe berries growing on a Midwest bike trail

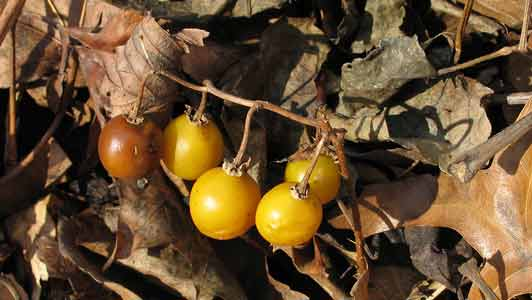
Ripe fruit
