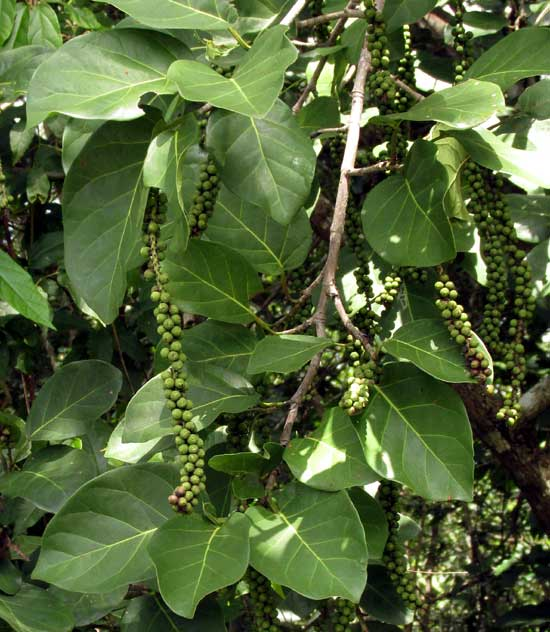
- Coccoloba spicata leafy stem with immature infructescences

Conservation status
- Least Concern (IUCN 3.1)

Scientific classification
- Kingdom: Plantae
- Clade: Tracheophytes
- Clade: Angiosperms
- Clade: Eudicots
- Order: Caryophyllales
- Family: Polygonaceae
- Genus: Coccoloba
- Species: C. spicata

Binomial name
- Coccoloba spicata Lundell

= Coccoloba spicata =

Species of plant

Coccoloba spicata, with no English name, is a small tree native to the Neotropics. It belongs to the family Polygonaceae.

== Description ==
Coccoloba spicata can be distinguished from many similar species of the genus Coccoloba by these key features:

- It grows up to 16 m (52 ft) tall with hairless stems up to 20 cm (8 in) in diameter. Ochrea surrounding stems where petioles attach loosely are up to 9 mm (3/8 in) high, sometimes larger, and bear stiff, reddish hairs when they emerge but soon become hairless.
- Leathery, somewhat stiff leaves with petioles up to 2.3 cm (7/8 in) long bear blades up to 15 cm (6 in) and 10 cm (3 7/8 in) wide; they are hairless except for along veins on the undersurface. Blade margins bear no indentations, teeth or projections, and their tips vary from rounded to a somewhat pointed, while their broad bases bear two backward-projecting lobes of various sizes. Normally 5 to 7 secondary veins branch off the midvein.
- Inflorescences are up to 25 cm (10 in) long and in flower are so slender that they appear stringy. The inflorescence's rachis bears low bumps, or "nodules," crowded along its length, with 1 or 2 flowers arising from each one. Flowers and the later fruits bear no pedicels.
- Flowers functionally are unisexual. Flower clusters are loosely surrounded below by papery, collar-like, variously hairy modified leaves known as bracteoles, or "ocreolae," which are to about 1.2 mm (1/16 in) high. The perianth tube, or hypanthium, is about 2 mm (1/16 in) long. Pictures on this page show male flowers. Female flowers have a 3-cornered ovary with 3 styles.
- Achene-type fruits are surrounded by the fleshy perianth tube, are nearly spherical, about 7 mm (1/4 in) long and a little less across, and with a rounded top not bulging or nipple-like as in similar species.

== Distribution ==
In Mexico, Coccoloba spicata occurs in the states of Campeche, Chiapas, Puebla, Quintana Roo, Tabasco, Veracruz and Yucatán. Also it occurs in adjacent Guatemala and Belize.

== Habitat ==
In Mexico's Yucatan Peninsula, Coccoloba spicata occurs in dry and moist forests of various kinds.

== Uses by humans ==
=== In Mayan ceremonies ===
In Mexico's Yucatan Peninsula, the Mayan people wrap the sturdy leaves of Coccoloba spicata around special breads offered during the Cha chaak ritual, asking for rain.

=== As rafters in roofs ===
In Mexico's Yucatan Peninsula, the traditional thatched roofs of the Mayan people employ the trunks of larger Coccoloba spicata trees, which they call "Boob," as rafters to which the palm-leaf thatch is secured.

== Taxonomy ==
In 1939 when Cyrus Longworth Lundell formally described and named Coccoloba spicata, he chose as his type specimen one of his own collections, #7325 from 1938 "... collected in young legume thicket around Sacred Cenote, Chichen Itza, Yucatan, Mexico."

=== Phylogeny ===
Molecular phylogenetic analysis has determined that Coccoloba spicata belongs to the authors' "Meso-Caribbean Clade 1," where it is sister to a clade containing C. barbadense, C. liebmannii, C. cozumelensis, C. tuerckheimii, C. nodosa and C. longifolia.

=== Etymology ===
The genus name Coccoloba derives from the Greek coccos, meaning "seed or berry," and lobos, meaning "capsule or pod," alluding to the fleshy hypanthium surrounding the fruit.

The species name spicata is from the Latin spicatus, meaning "bearing or resembling a spike," referring to this species' long, slender inflorescences, which botanically are known as spikes.

== Gallery ==
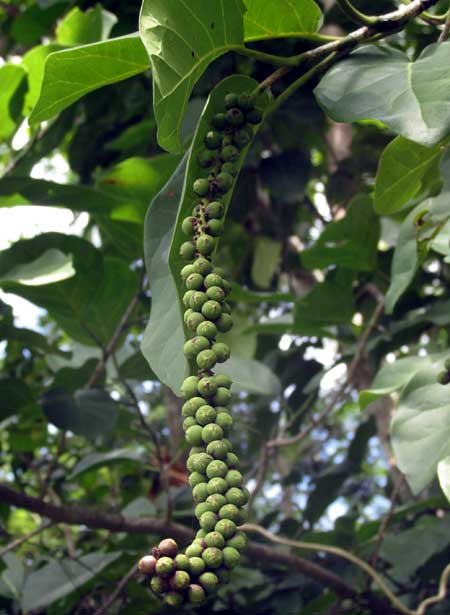
Dangling infructescence

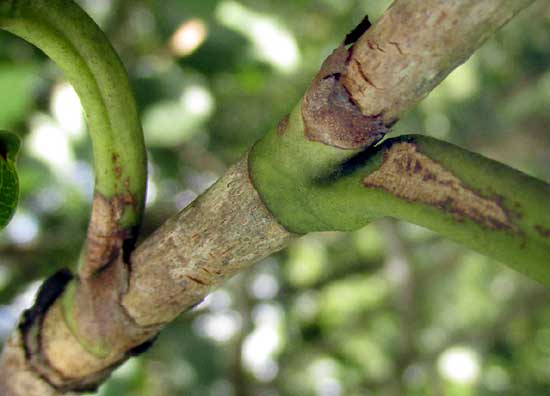
Petioles and ochrea

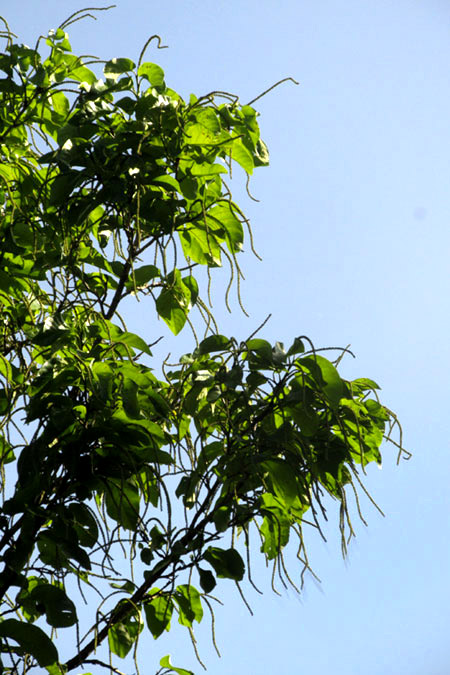
Branches with dangling inflorescences

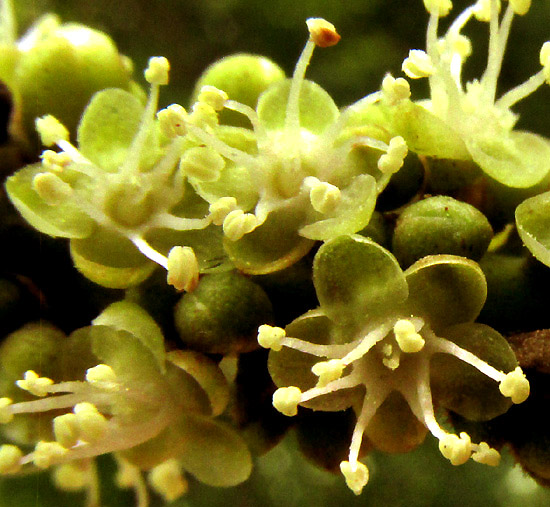
Male flowers

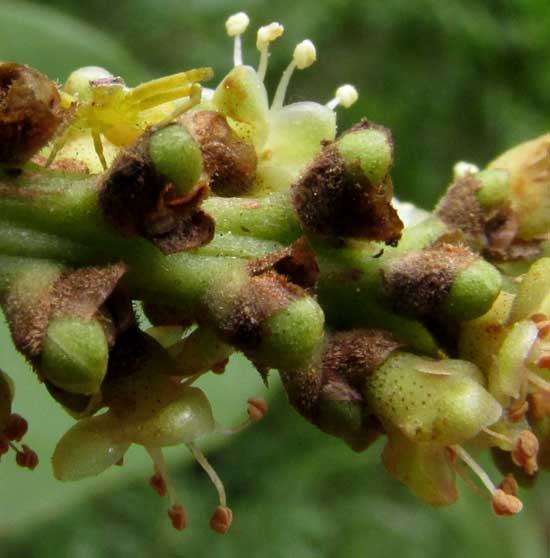
Flowers with no pedicels
