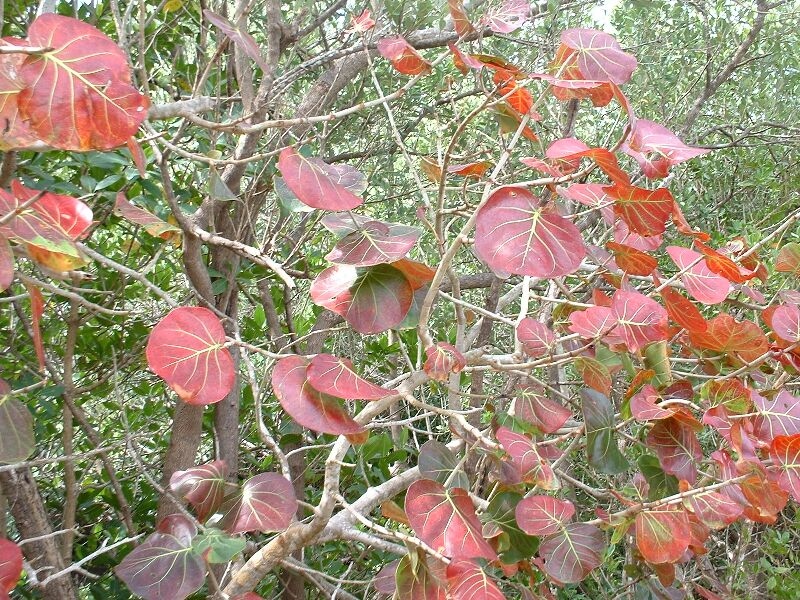
- Coccoloba uvifera (seagrape) bush

Scientific classification
- Kingdom: Plantae
- Clade: Tracheophytes
- Clade: Angiosperms
- Clade: Eudicots
- Order: Caryophyllales
- Family: Polygonaceae
- Subfamily: Eriogonoideae
- Genus: Coccoloba; P.Browne

Species
- See text

Synonyms
- Campderia Benth.; Coccolobis P.Browne, orth. var.; Guaiabara Mill.; Guiabara Adans.; Lyperodendron Willd. ex Meisn.; Naucorephes Raf.; Uvifera L. ex Kuntze

= Coccoloba =

Genus of flowering plants

Coccoloba is a genus of 177 species of flowering plants in the family Polygonaceae, which is native to the Neotropics. There is no overall English name for the genus, although many of the individual species have widely used common names.

== Range ==
The genus is native to tropical and subtropical regions of the Americas, in South America, the Caribbean, Central America, and Mexico, with two species extending into Florida.

== Description ==
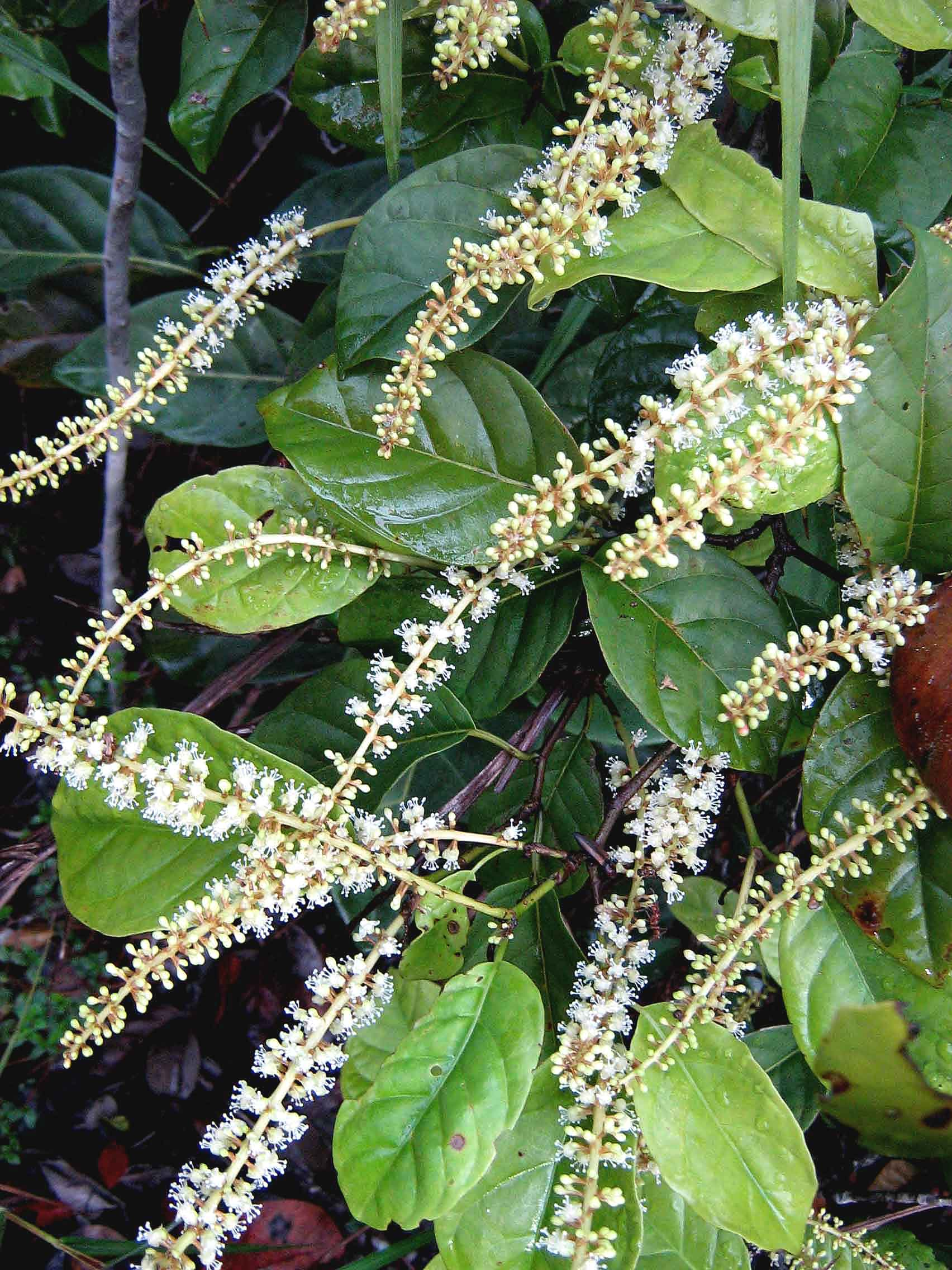
Coccoloba arborescens

Species in the genus are shrubs, trees, and lianas, and are mostly evergreen. The leaves are alternate, often large (to very large in some species; up to 2.5m (8 feet) long in C. gigantifolia), with the leaves on juvenile plants often larger and of different shape to those of mature plants. The flowers are produced in spikes. The fruit is a three-angled achene, surrounded by an often brightly coloured fleshy perianth, edible in some species, though often astringent. Species in the genus have been characterized as dioecious, but this is unclear. Trioecy has been documented in C. cereifera.

== Species ==
177 species are accepted.

- Coccoloba acapulcensis Standl.
- Coccoloba acrostichoides Cham.
- Coccoloba acuminata Kunth
- Coccoloba acuna R.A.Howard
- Coccoloba alainii Acev.-Rodr.
- Coccoloba albicans Ekman
- Coccoloba alnifolia Casar.
- Coccoloba arborescens (Vell.) R.A.Howard
- Coccoloba argentinensis Speg.
- Coccoloba armata C.Wright ex Griseb.
- Coccoloba ascendens Duss ex Lindau
- Coccoloba baracoensis O.C.Schmidt
- Coccoloba barbadensis Jacq. – uvero
- Coccoloba barkeri Ekman & O.C.Schmidt
- Coccoloba belizensis Standl.
- Coccoloba benitensis Britton
- Coccoloba berazainiae I.Castañeda
- Coccoloba × boxii Sandwith
- Coccoloba brasiliensis Nees & Mart.
- Coccoloba buchii O.C.Schmidt
- Coccoloba bullata R.A.Howard
- Coccoloba burkeae J.J.Ancona, J.J.Ortiz-Diaz & J.Tun
- Coccoloba caesia Ekman ex O.C.Schmidt
- Coccoloba caracasana Meisn. – papaturro
- Coccoloba caravellae Sastre & Fiard
- Coccoloba ceibensis O.C.Schmidt
- Coccoloba cereifera Schwacke
- Coccoloba charitostachya Standl.
- Coccoloba chiapensis Standl.
- Coccoloba cholutecensis R.A.Howard
- Coccoloba clementis R.A.Howard
- Coccoloba colombiana R.A.Howard
- Coccoloba conduplicata Maguire
- Coccoloba cordata Cham.
- Coccoloba coriacea A.Rich.
- Coccoloba coronata Jacq.
- Coccoloba costata C.Wright – uvilla
- Coccoloba cowellii Britton
- Coccoloba cozumelensis Hemsl.
- Coccoloba cristalensis (Alain) I.Castañeda
- Coccoloba cruegeri Lindau
- Coccoloba cujabensis Wedd.
- Coccoloba darienensis R.A.Howard
- Coccoloba declinata (Vell.) Mart.
- Coccoloba densifrons Mart. ex Meisn.
- Coccoloba diversifolia Jacq. – pigeonplum
- Coccoloba dussii Lindau
- Coccoloba efigeniana J.J.Ortiz-Diaz & J.J.Ancona
- Coccoloba escuintlensis Lundell
- Coccoloba excelsa Benth.
- Coccoloba fallax Lindau
- Coccoloba fastigiata Meisn.
- Coccoloba fawcettii O.C.Schmidt
- Coccoloba filipes Standl.
- Coccoloba flavescens Jacq.
- Coccoloba floresii Ortiz-Díaz & Arnelas
- Coccoloba floribunda (Benth.) Lindau
- Coccoloba fuertesii Urb.
- Coccoloba gardneri Meisn.
- Coccoloba geniculata Lindau
- Coccoloba gentryi R.A.Howard
- Coccoloba gigantifolia E.Melo, C.A.Cid Ferreira & Gribel (with human-sized leaves)
- Coccoloba glaziovii Lindau
- Coccoloba goldmanii Standl.
- Coccoloba gracilis Kunth
- Coccoloba grandiflora Lindau
- Coccoloba guanacastensis W.C.Burger
- Coccoloba guaranitica Hassl.
- Coccoloba gymnorrhachis Sandwith
- Coccoloba hirtella Lundell
- Coccoloba hondurensis Lundell
- Coccoloba hotteana O.C.Schmidt
- Coccoloba howardii Castañeda
- Coccoloba humboldtii Meisn.
- Coccoloba × hybrida I.Castañeda
- Coccoloba ibarrae J.J.Ancona & J.J.Ortiz-Diaz
- Coccoloba incrassata Urb.
- Coccoloba × jamaicensis Lindau
- Coccoloba jimenezii Alain
- Coccoloba johnstonii R.A.Howard
- Coccoloba jurgensenii Lindau
- Coccoloba krugii Lindau – whitewood seagrape
- Coccoloba laevis Casar.
- Coccoloba lanceolata Lindau
- Coccoloba lapathifolia Standl.
- Coccoloba lasseri Lundell
- Coccoloba latifolia Poir.
- Coccoloba lehmannii Lindau ex Hieron.
- Coccoloba leoganensis Jacq.
- Coccoloba leonardii R.A.Howard
- Coccoloba liebmannii Lindau
- Coccoloba lindaviana R.A.Howard
- Coccoloba lindeniana (Benth.) Lindau
- Coccoloba liportizii Gómez-Laur. & N.Zamora
- Coccoloba llewelynii R.A.Howard
- Coccoloba longifolia Fisch. ex Lindau
- Coccoloba longipes S.Moore
- Coccoloba lucidula Benth.
- Coccoloba × lundellii Standl.
- Coccoloba manzinellensis Beurl.
- Coccoloba meissneriana (Britton) K.Schum.
- Coccoloba microphylla Griseb.
- Coccoloba microstachya Willd. – puckhout
- Coccoloba mollis Casar.
- Coccoloba montana Standl.
- Coccoloba mosenii Lindau
- Coccoloba munizii Borhidi
- Coccoloba najarroi J.J.Ortiz-Diaz & J.J.Ancona
- Coccoloba nervosa Alain
- Coccoloba nicaraguensis Standl. & L.O.Williams
- Coccoloba nigrescens Lindau
- Coccoloba nipensis Urb.
- Coccoloba nitida Kunth
- Coccoloba nodosa Lindau
- Coccoloba northropiae Britton
- Coccoloba nutans Kunth
- Coccoloba obovata Kunth
- Coccoloba obtusifolia Jacq.
- Coccoloba ochreolata Wedd.
- Coccoloba oligantha Alain
- Coccoloba orinocana R.A.Howard
- Coccoloba ortizii R.A.Howard
- Coccoloba ovata Benth.
- Coccoloba padiformis Meisn.
- Coccoloba pallida C.Wright ex Griseb. – pale seagrape
- Coccoloba paraensis Meisn.
- Coccoloba paraguariensis Lindau
- Coccoloba pauciflora Urb. – uvilla cimarrona
- Coccoloba peltata Schott
- Coccoloba persicaria Wedd.
- Coccoloba peruviana Lindau
- Coccoloba picardae Urb.
- Coccoloba plantaginea Wedd.
- Coccoloba plumieri Griseb.
- Coccoloba porphyrostachys Gómez-Laur.
- Coccoloba portuguesana R.A.Howard
- Coccoloba praecox C.Wright ex Lindau
- Coccoloba proctorii R.A.Howard
- Coccoloba pubescens L. – grandleaf seagrape
- Coccoloba pyrifolia Desf. – uvera
- Coccoloba ramosissima Wedd.
- Coccoloba reflexa Lindau
- Coccoloba reflexiflora Standl.
- Coccoloba retirensis R.A.Howard
- Coccoloba retusa Griseb.
- Coccoloba rigida Meisn.
- Coccoloba rosea Meisn.
- Coccoloba rufescens C.Wright
- Coccoloba rugosa Desf. – ortegon
- Coccoloba ruiziana Lindau
- Coccoloba salicifolia Wedd.
- Coccoloba samanensis O.C.Schmidt
- Coccoloba savannarum Standl.
- Coccoloba scandens Casar.
- Coccoloba shaferi Britton
- Coccoloba sintenisii Urb. – uvero de monte
- Coccoloba spicata Lundell
- Coccoloba spinescens Morong
- Coccoloba steinbachii R.A.Howard
- Coccoloba sticticaulis Wedd.
- Coccoloba striata Benth.
- Coccoloba subcordata (Bertero ex DC.) Lindau
- Coccoloba swartzii Meisn. – Swartz's pigeonplum
- Coccoloba taylorii Urb.
- Coccoloba tenuiflora Lindau
- Coccoloba tenuifolia L. – Bahama pigeonplum
- Coccoloba tiliacea Lindau
- Coccoloba toaensis Alain
- Coccoloba troyana Urb.
- Coccoloba tuerckheimii Donn.Sm.
- Coccoloba tunii Ortiz-Díaz & Arnelas
- Coccoloba uvifera (L.) L. – seagrape
- Coccoloba venosa L. – false chiggergrape
- Coccoloba warmingii Meisn.
- Coccoloba williamsii Standl.
- Coccoloba wrightii Lindau
- Coccoloba wurdackii R.A.Howard
- Coccoloba yaracuyensis R.A.Howard
- Coccoloba yaterensis I.Castañeda
- Coccoloba zebra Griseb.
- Coccoloba zuliana R.A.Howard

Other sources:

== Ecology ==
The species Coccoloba cereifera is notable for being restricted to an area of only some 26 square km on a single low peak near Serra do Cipó National Park, in the Brazilian state of Minas Gerais.

== Cultivation and uses ==
One species, Coccoloba uvifera (Seagrape) is commonly cultivated for its edible fruit, and the genus name is sometimes used to denote this species.
