= Auanema =

Scientific classification
- Kingdom: Animalia
- Phylum: Nematoda
- Class: Chromadorea
- Order: Rhabditida
- Family: Rhabditidae
- Genus: Auanema; Kanzaki et al, 2017

Genus of roundworms

Auanema is a genus of halophilic roundworms from the family Rhabditidae, first described by a group of biologists in 2017. It is found in Mono Lake in the US state of California, a lake of high salinity and can survive a level of arsenic dosage that is lethal to humans.

== Description ==
Auanema can survive in environments with an arsenic dosage of 500 times the lethal dosage for humans. Certain species of this genus were observed to have three sexes: male, female and hermaphrodite.

== Species ==
The genus has the following six species:

- Auanema freiburgensis Kanzaki et al., 2017
- Auanema melissensis Sudhaus, 2023
- Auanema reciproca Sudhaus, 1974
- Auanema rhodensis Kanzaki et al., 2017
- Auanema seurati Maupas, 1916
- Auanema viguieri Maupas, 1916
