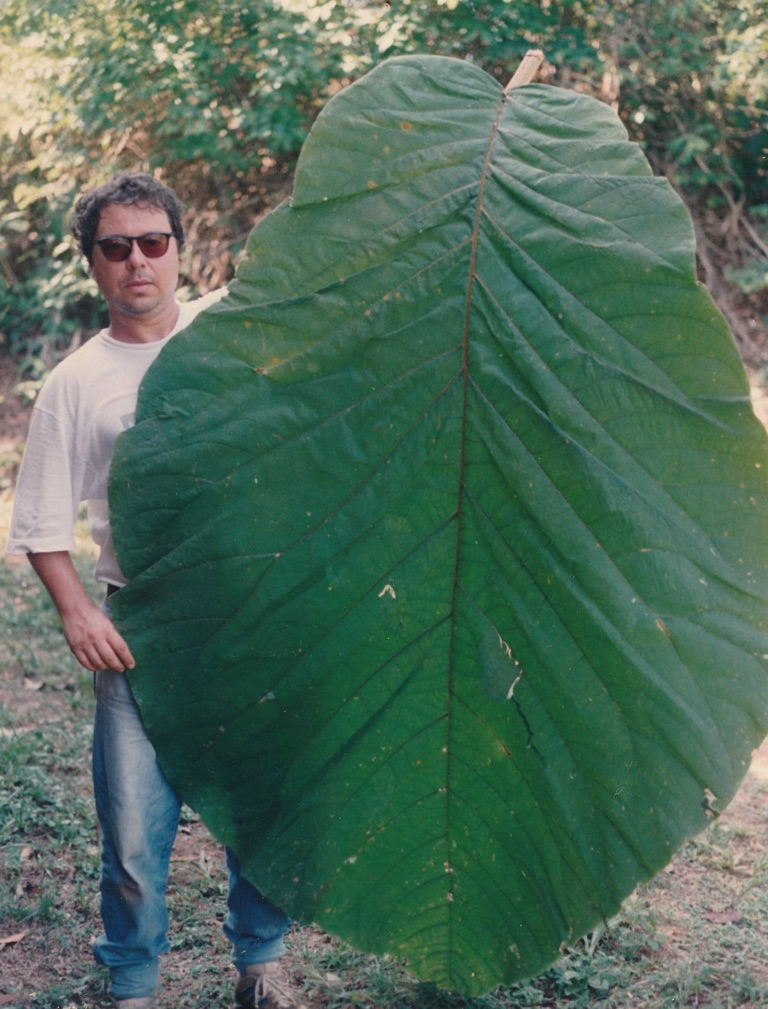
- Single leaf overtowering an adult man and illustrating its enormous size

Scientific classification
- Kingdom: Plantae
- Clade: Tracheophytes
- Clade: Angiosperms
- Clade: Eudicots
- Order: Caryophyllales
- Family: Polygonaceae
- Genus: Coccoloba
- Species: C. gigantifolia

Binomial name
- Coccoloba gigantifolia E. Melo, C.A. Cid Ferreira & R. Gribel
- Distribution of Coccoloba gigantifolia (North Brazil)

= Coccoloba gigantifolia =

Species of flowering plant

Coccoloba gigantifolia is a species of flowering plant in the knotweed family Polygonaceae. It is endemic to the Madeira River Basin in the states of Amazonas and Rondônia in the central and southwestern Brazilian Amazon. This species resembles that of Coccoloba mollis but differs in that it has much larger leaves in its fertile branches.

== Description ==
Coccoloba gigantifolia is a tree which grows to about 10–15 m (33–49 ft) in height and has leaves 0.6–2.5 m (2 ft 0 in – 8 ft 2 in) long, and 0.5–1.4 m (1 ft 8 in – 4 ft 7 in) wide, among the largest known leaves among dicotyledonous plants after some Gunnera and Victoria species. The petiole is 5–10 cm (2.0–3.9 in) long. The flowers are 1-2 mm long, greenish-white, produced in an inflorescence comprising a paniculate branched thyrse 40–80 cm (16–31 in) long. In addition to the large leaves, it can be distinguished from its congeners by its straight trunk, with transverse rings, the articulated petiole inserted in the ochrea at the base of its leaves, its general pubescence, and the presence of hollow pith in the branches. The huge leaves form a rosette at the top of the main trunk and each of the few branches. This tree does not have a known indigenous name.

Close up view of C. gigantifolia from below

== Botanical history ==
The plant was first observed by botanists in the Canumã River, a tributary of Madeira River, during an expedition in 1982, but no specimen was collected due to lack of fertile parts. Again in 1986, an expedition led by the botanist Juan Revilla found and made a photographic record of a very large-leaved but sterile Coccoloba individual near Porto Velho city, in the state of Rondônia; again no herbarium specimen was collected. Between 1989 and 1993, some 14 individuals were found in several expeditions in Jamari National Forest Reserve; some large leaves were collected even though the specimens were sterile. Individuals of large-leaved Coccoloba were again photographed by Silvestre Silva in 1995 at a vicinal road connecting the city of Autazes to the left bank of the Madeira River, about 110 km southeast of Manaus. Finally, an August 2005 expedition in another area in the vicinity of Jamari Forest Reserve led to the collection of fertile samples of inflorescences along with fallen mature fruits and seeds beneath one individual tree.

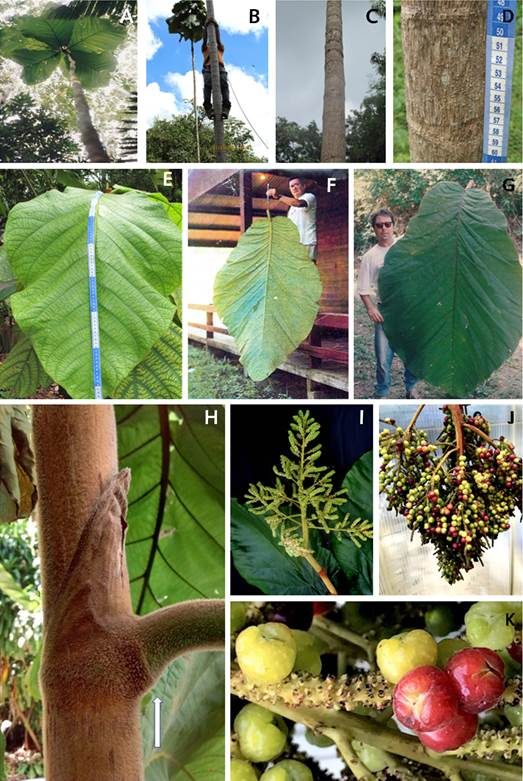
Multi-panel figure of the species published in a 2019 study, showing morphology and reproductive structures

== Etymology ==
The specific epithet gigantifolia is in reference to the species unusual leaf proportion.
