= Auanema melissensis =

Scientific classification
- Kingdom: Animalia
- Phylum: Nematoda
- Class: Chromadorea
- Order: Rhabditida
- Family: Rhabditidae
- Genus: Auanema
- Species: A. melissensis

Binomial name
- Auanema melissensis Tandonnet, Haq, Turner, Grana, Paganopoulou, Adams, Dhawan, Kanzaki, Nuez, Félix & Pires-daSilva, 2022

Species of nematode

Auanema melissensis is a free-living, three-sexed, non-parasitic, nematode. They were fed with an E. coli strain when in culture conditions.
