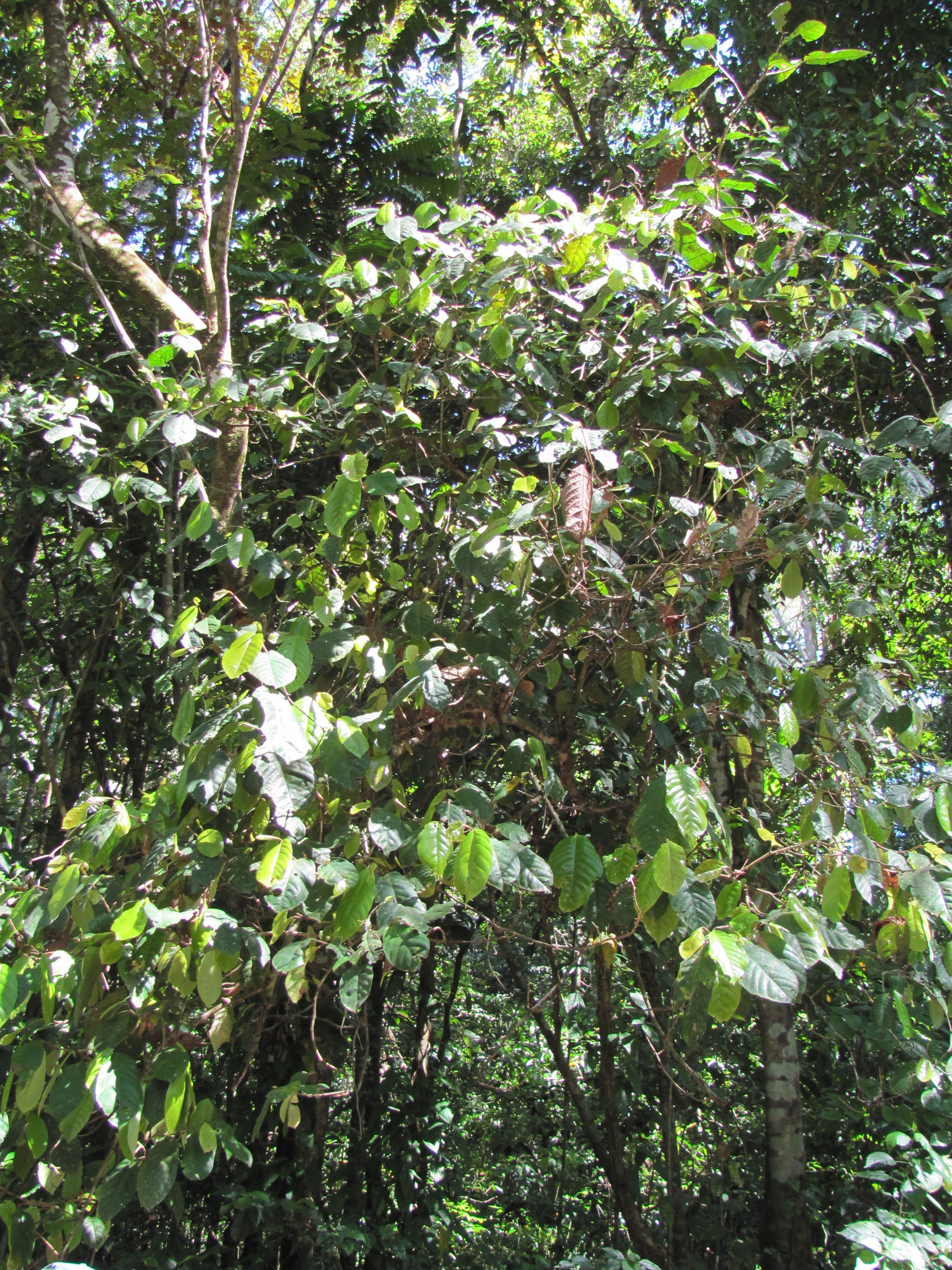
- A Coccoloba padiformis tree in a low elevation wet forest on the Osa Peninsula of Costa Rica

Conservation status
- Least Concern (IUCN 3.1)

Scientific classification
- Kingdom: Plantae
- Clade: Tracheophytes
- Clade: Angiosperms
- Clade: Eudicots
- Order: Caryophyllales
- Family: Polygonaceae
- Genus: Coccoloba
- Species: C. padiformis

Binomial name
- Coccoloba padiformis Meisn.

= Coccoloba padiformis =

Species of flowering plant

Coccoloba padiformis is a plant species in the genus Coccoloba. It is distributed in Mesoamerica and northern South America.
