= Coccoloba pyrifolia =

Scientific classification
- Kingdom: Plantae
- Clade: Tracheophytes
- Clade: Angiosperms
- Clade: Eudicots
- Order: Caryophyllales
- Family: Polygonaceae
- Genus: Coccoloba
- Species: C. pyrifolia

Binomial name
- Coccoloba pyrifolia Desf.

Synonyms
- Coccoloba kunthiana Meissn.

Species of plant

Coccoloba pyrifolia, the pearleaf seagrape (Spanish: uvera), is a species of flowering plant endemic to Puerto Rico. It is a member of the buckwheat family. It was described by René Louiche Desfontaines in 1815.
