= Auanema rhodensis =

Scientific classification
- Kingdom: Animalia
- Phylum: Nematoda
- Class: Chromadorea
- Order: Rhabditida
- Family: Rhabditidae
- Genus: Auanema
- Species: A. rhodensis

Binomial name
- Auanema rhodensis Kanzaki, Kiontke, Tanaka, Hirooka, Schwarz, Müller-Reichert, Chaudhuri & Pires da Silva, 2017

Species of nematode

Auanema rhodensis is a species of free-living, non-parasitic nematode in the family Rhabditidae. It belongs to the genus Auanema, whose members are notable for having three biological sexes: males, females, and hermaphrodites.

The species was formally described in 2017 after being isolated from partially blood-fed deer ticks collected in the United States.

== Description ==
Auanema rhodensis is sexually dimorphic, with females measuring approximately 980 to 1,214 μm in length, while males measure between 595 and 737 μm. Like other members of its genus, the species exhibits a trioecious reproductive system consisting of males, females, and self-fertile hermaphrodites.

== Biology ==
The species is free-living and feeds on microorganisms rather than parasitizing animal hosts. Although initially isolated from deer ticks, it is not considered a parasite of ticks. Laboratory observations have shown that A. rhodensis is capable of consuming bacterial biofilm, a characteristic that may influence microbial communities in its natural habitat.

== Research ==
Auanema rhodensis has become an important model organism for studies of sex determination, chromosome evolution, and reproductive strategies. Its unusual three-sex reproductive system has made it valuable for investigating the evolution of mating systems and the genetics of sex chromosomes in nematodes.

== See also ==
- Auanema
- Trioecy
- Caenorhabditis elegans
