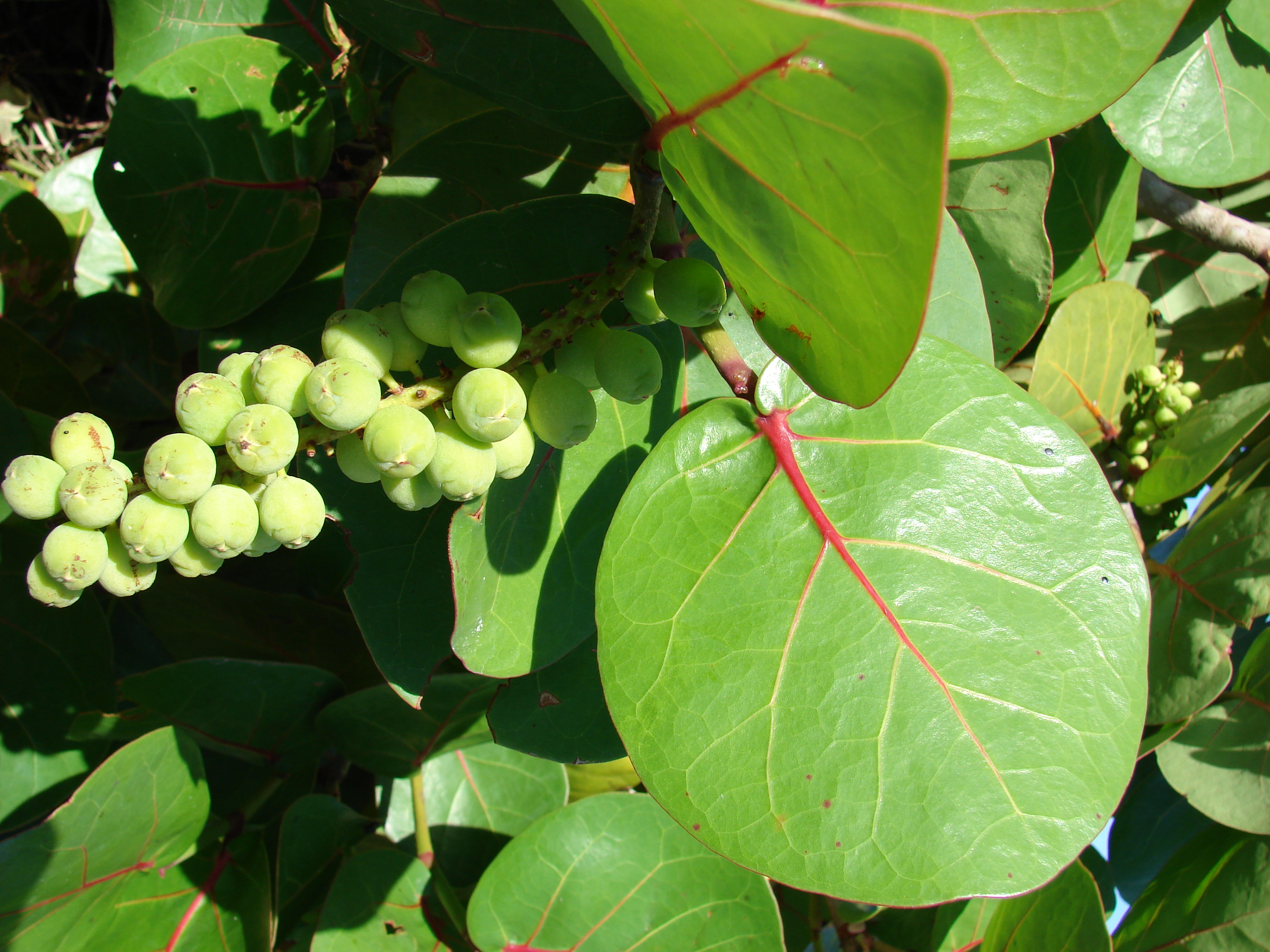

Conservation status
- Least Concern (IUCN 3.1)

- Secure (NatureServe)

Scientific classification
- Kingdom: Plantae
- Clade: Tracheophytes
- Clade: Angiosperms
- Clade: Eudicots
- Order: Caryophyllales
- Family: Polygonaceae
- Genus: Coccoloba
- Species: C. uvifera

Binomial name
- Coccoloba uvifera (L.) L.

= Coccoloba uvifera =

Species of tree

Coccoloba uvifera is a species of tree and flowering plant in the buckwheat family, Polygonaceae. Its common names include seagrape and baygrape. It is native to coastal beaches throughout tropical America and the Caribbean. It has edible fruit, among other uses.

== Description ==
The bark is grayish with light patches. The leaves are fairly round, sometimes initially brownish, maturing to green and often with red veins. The leaves decompose slowly, turning red before withering. Whitish to greenish flowers are produced on long spikes.

In late summer, the plant bears green fruit, about 2 cm (3/4 in) diameter, in large, grape-like clusters. The fruit ripens to purplish-red and contains a hard pit constituting most of its volume.

The species is dioecious, with male and female flowers borne on separate plants. Cross-pollination is necessary for fruit to develop, aided by insects including honey bees. Male and female plants can be distinguished by the appearance of their flowers, as males usually show dead flower stalks.

C. uvifera can be propagated by seeds and cuttings, but the seeds do not survive being stored.

== Taxonomy ==
The first botanical names of the plant were assigned in 1696 by Hans Sloane, who called it Prunus maritima racemosa, "maritime grape-cluster Prunus", and Leonard Plukenet, who named it Uvifera littorea, "grape-bearer of the shore", both of which names reflect the European concept of "sea-grape", expressed in a number of languages by the explorers of the times. The natives viewed it as a large mulberry.

The first edition of Carl Linnaeus's Species Plantarum (1753), based on Plukenet, assigned the plant to Polygonum uvifera and noted flores non vidi, "I have not seen the flowers." Subsequently, Patrick Browne, The Civil and Natural History of Jamaica (1756) devised Coccoloba for it. Relying on Browne, Linnaeus' second edition (1762), changed the classification to Coccolobus uvifera, citing all the other names. Coccoloba comes from the Greek kokkolobis, a kind of grape, literally, "berry pod".

== Distribution and habitat ==
The species is native to Florida, Mexico, Central America, western South America, and the Caribbean (including the Greater and Lesser Antilles), the Bahamas, and Bermuda, where it is found on coastal beaches.

== Ecology ==
Although it is capable of surviving down to about 2 °C (35.6 °F), the tree cannot survive frost. The plant is wind-resistant, highly tolerant of salt, and moderately tolerant of sun, shade, and drought. It is hardy to USDA zones 9B–11.

The plant is largely disease and pest free. The sea grape borer, a moth native to Florida, bores into small twigs and branches and kills them along with their leaves, but usually poses little risk to the plant overall.

== Uses ==
Coccoloba uvifera is a popular ornamental plant in south Florida yards. It serves as a dune stabilizer and protective habitat for small animals. Tall sea grape plants behind beaches help prevent sea turtles from being distracted by lights from nearby buildings. The sap has been used for dyeing and tanning leather. The wood has occasionally been used in furniture, as firewood, or for making charcoal. The fruits of the sea grape may be eaten raw, cooked into jellies and jams, or fermented into sea grape wine. The leaves of the sea grape can be made into a tea and honey bees can make a certain type of honey with the nectar of the sea grape flowers.

In other places native to sea grapes, various parts of the plant are used for medicinal purposes. For example, in Puerto Rico and the Caribbean the roots and bark of the plants are used in traditional medicine, while in the Yucatán peninsula tea made from the bark of sea grape mixed with alcohol is used for ulcers. In French Guiana, a juice made from the whole plant, called Jamaica kino, is used to treat diarrhea and dysentery.

== Gallery ==
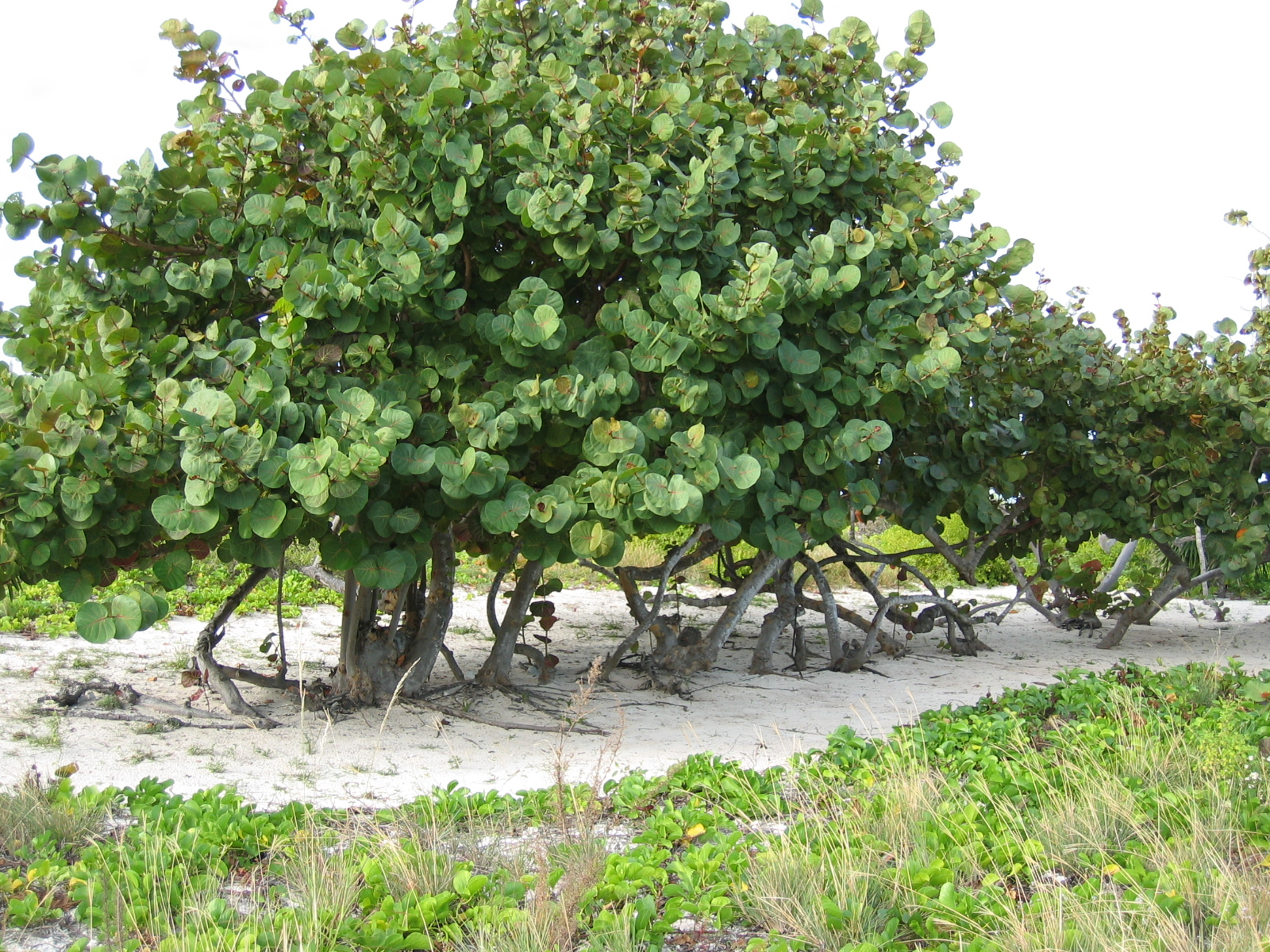
Seagrape tree in Cuba

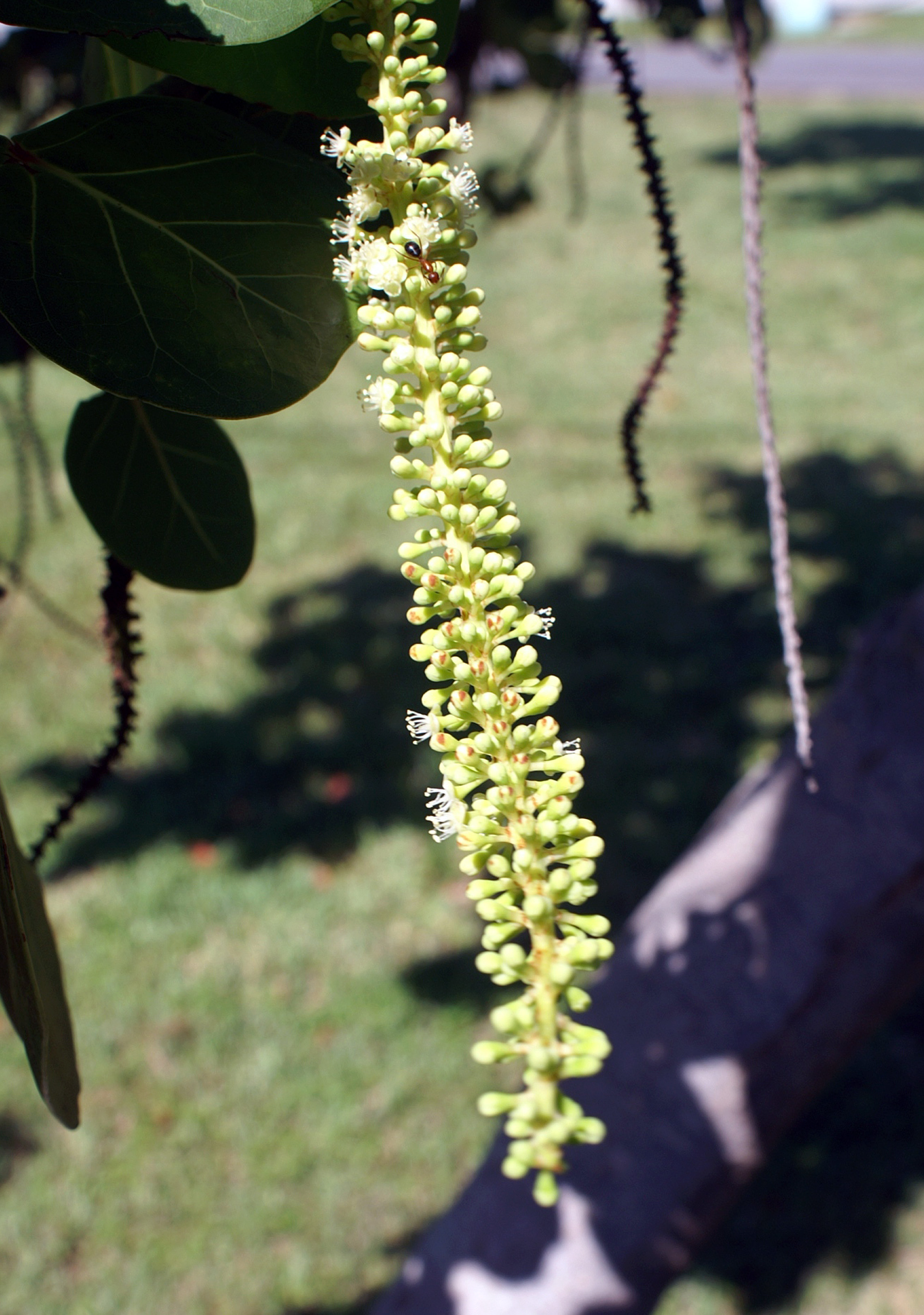

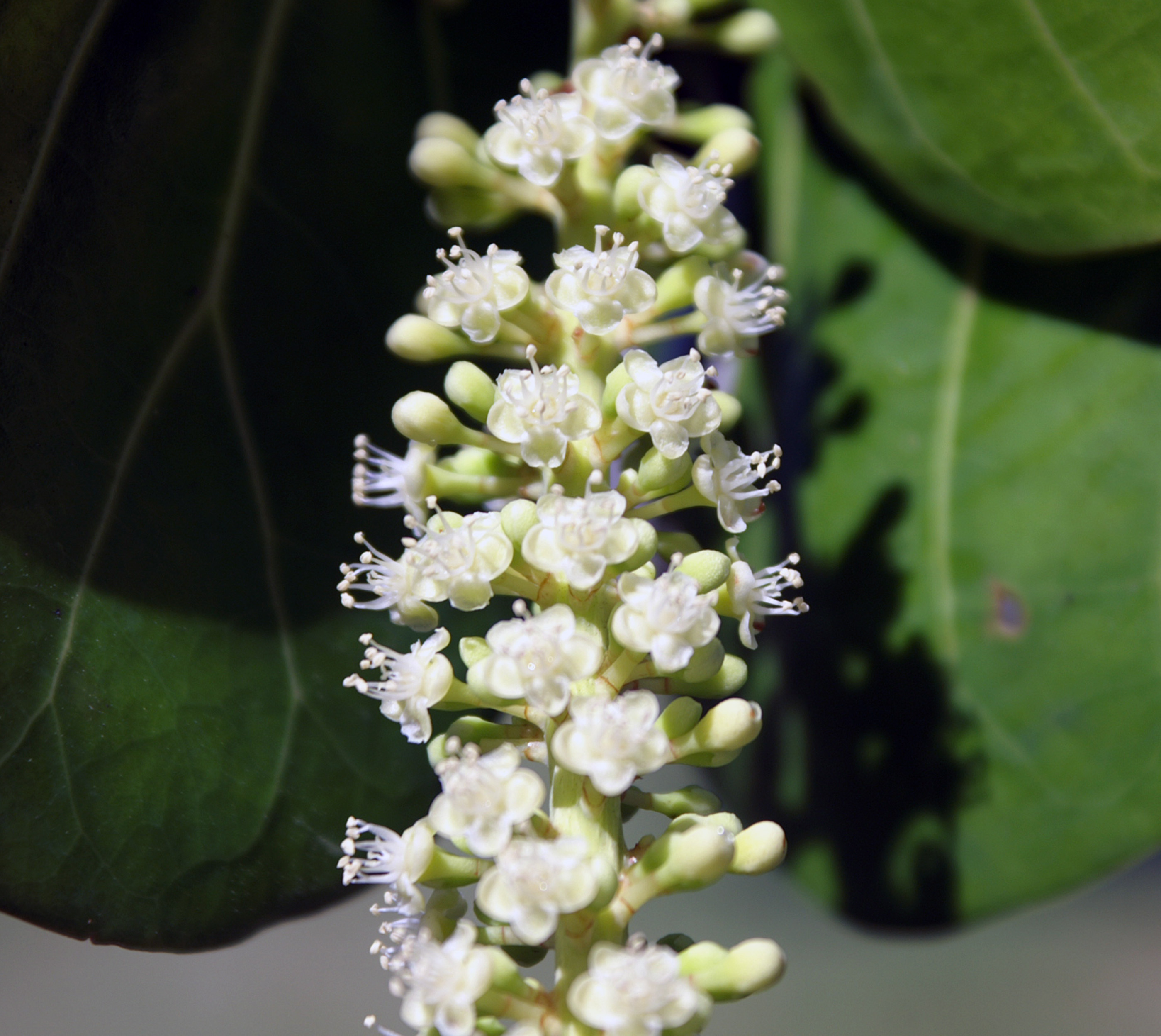

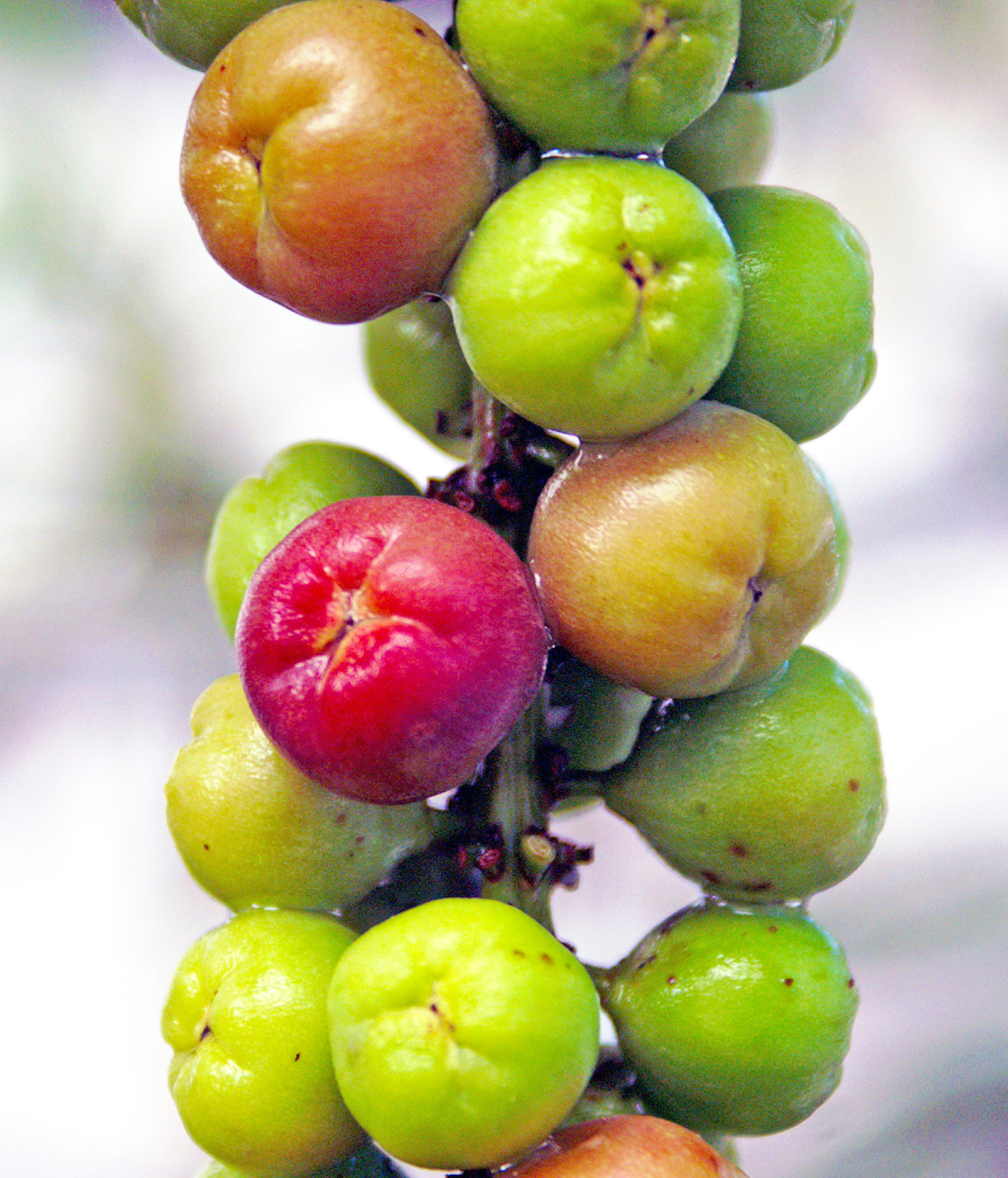

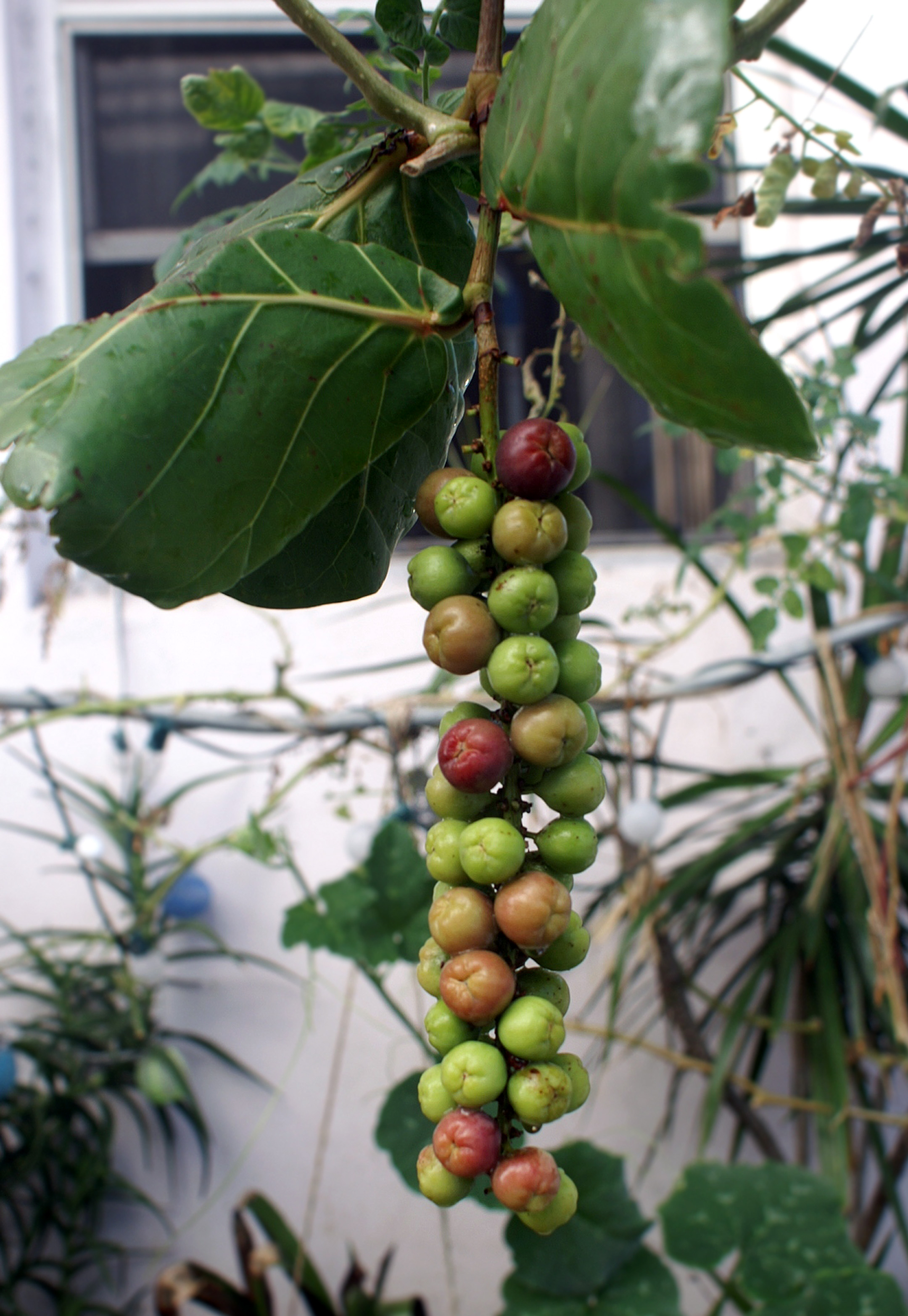

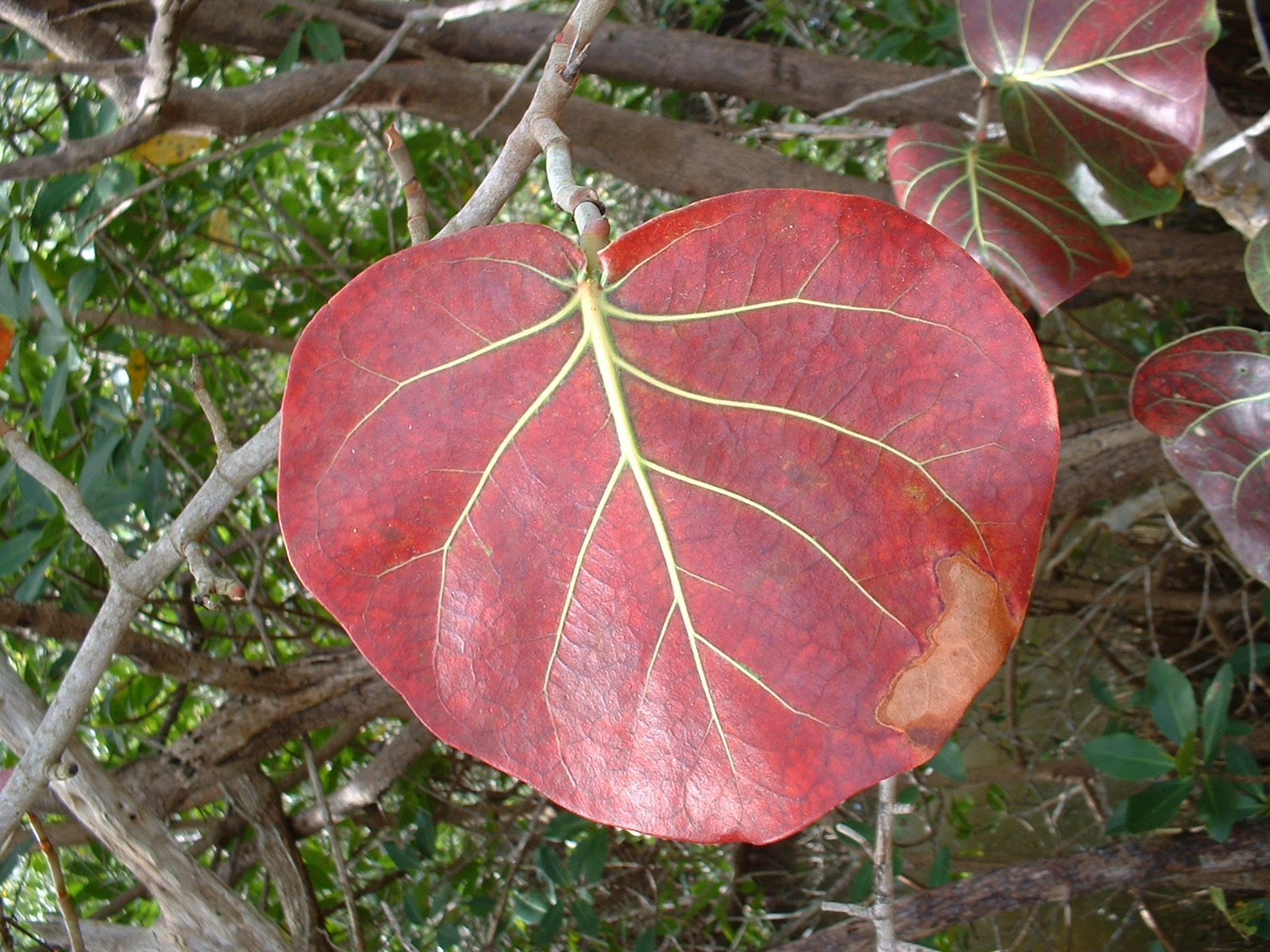
Aged seagrape leaf (actual diameter about 25 cm or 9.8 in)

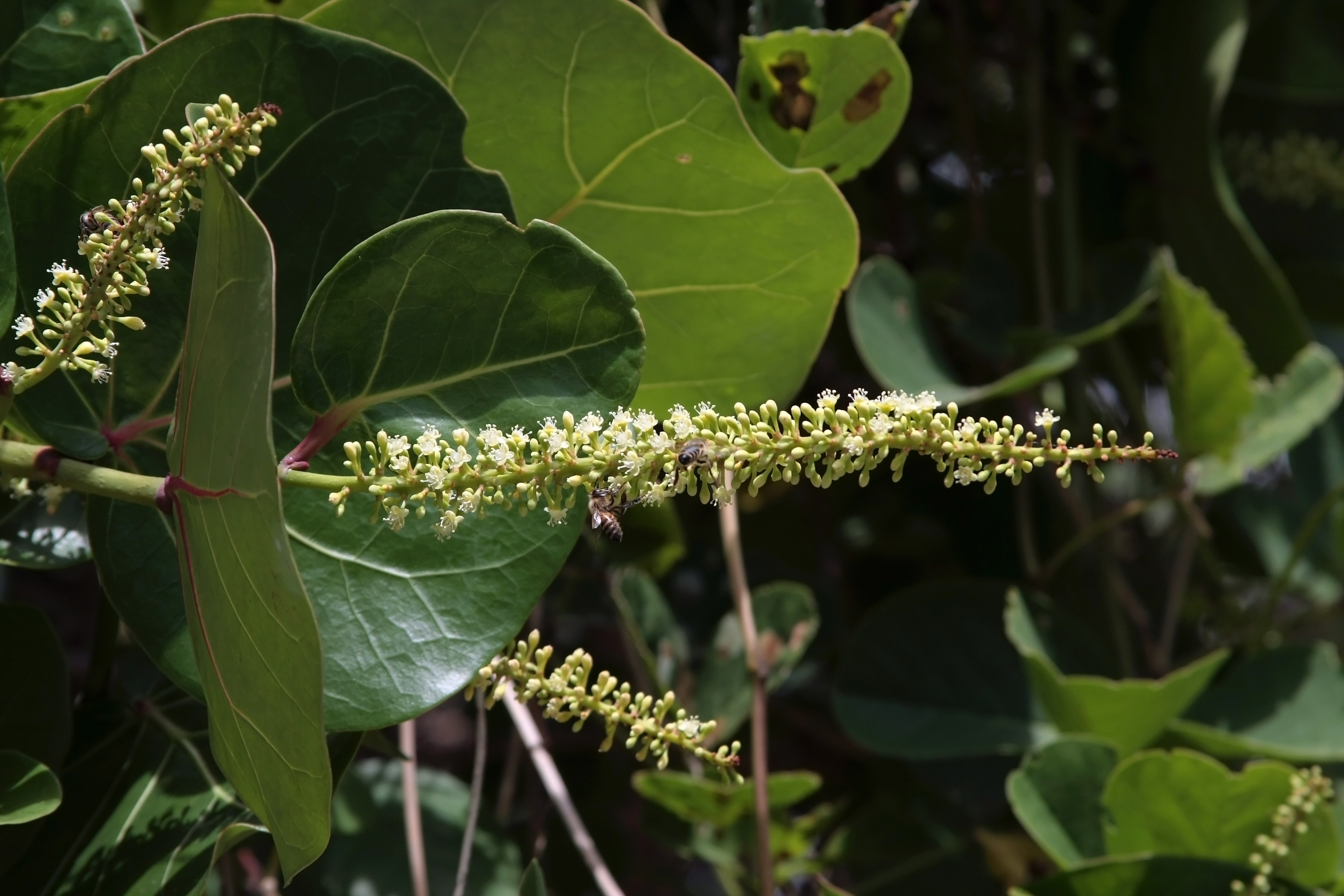
Flowers

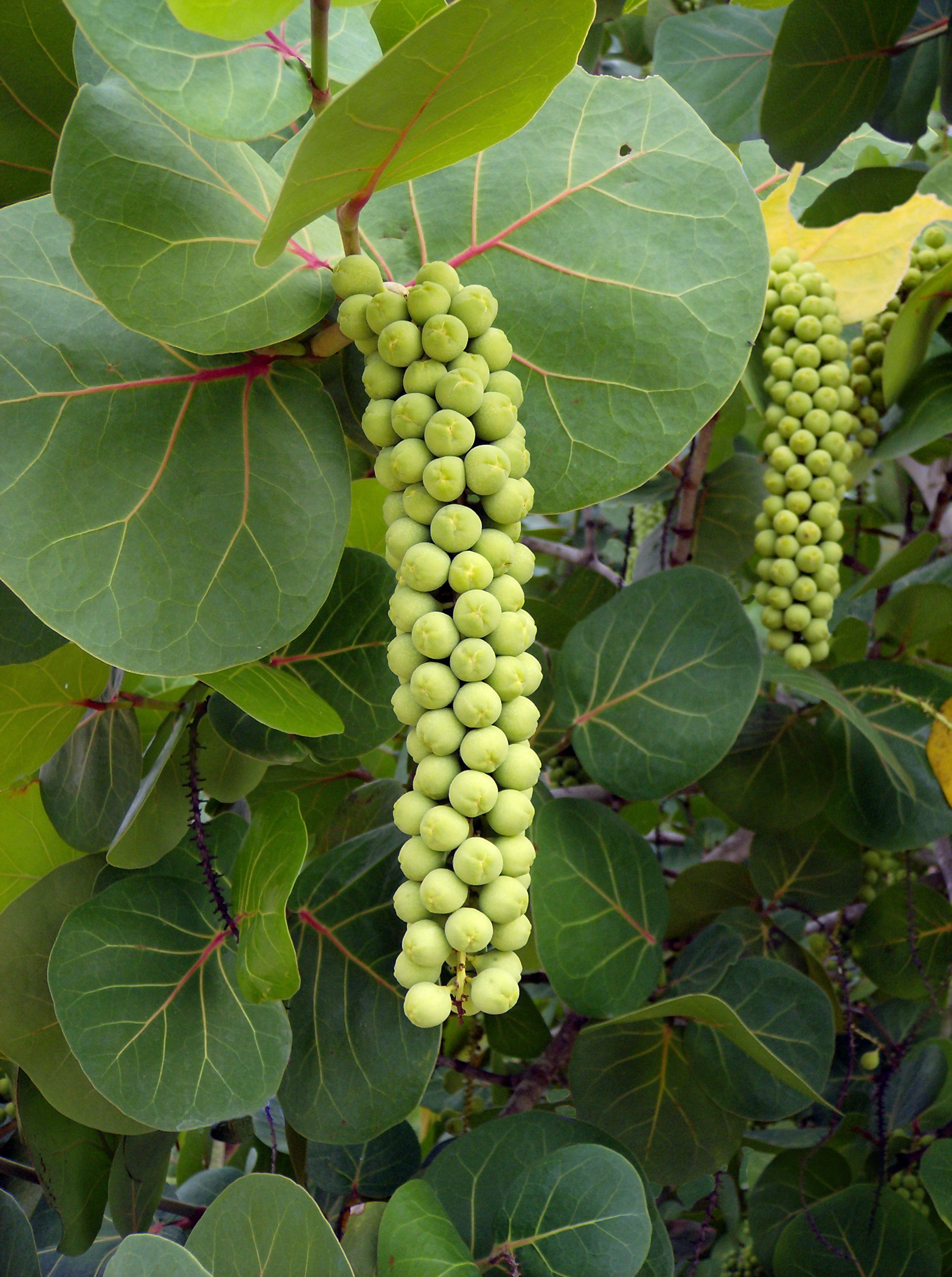

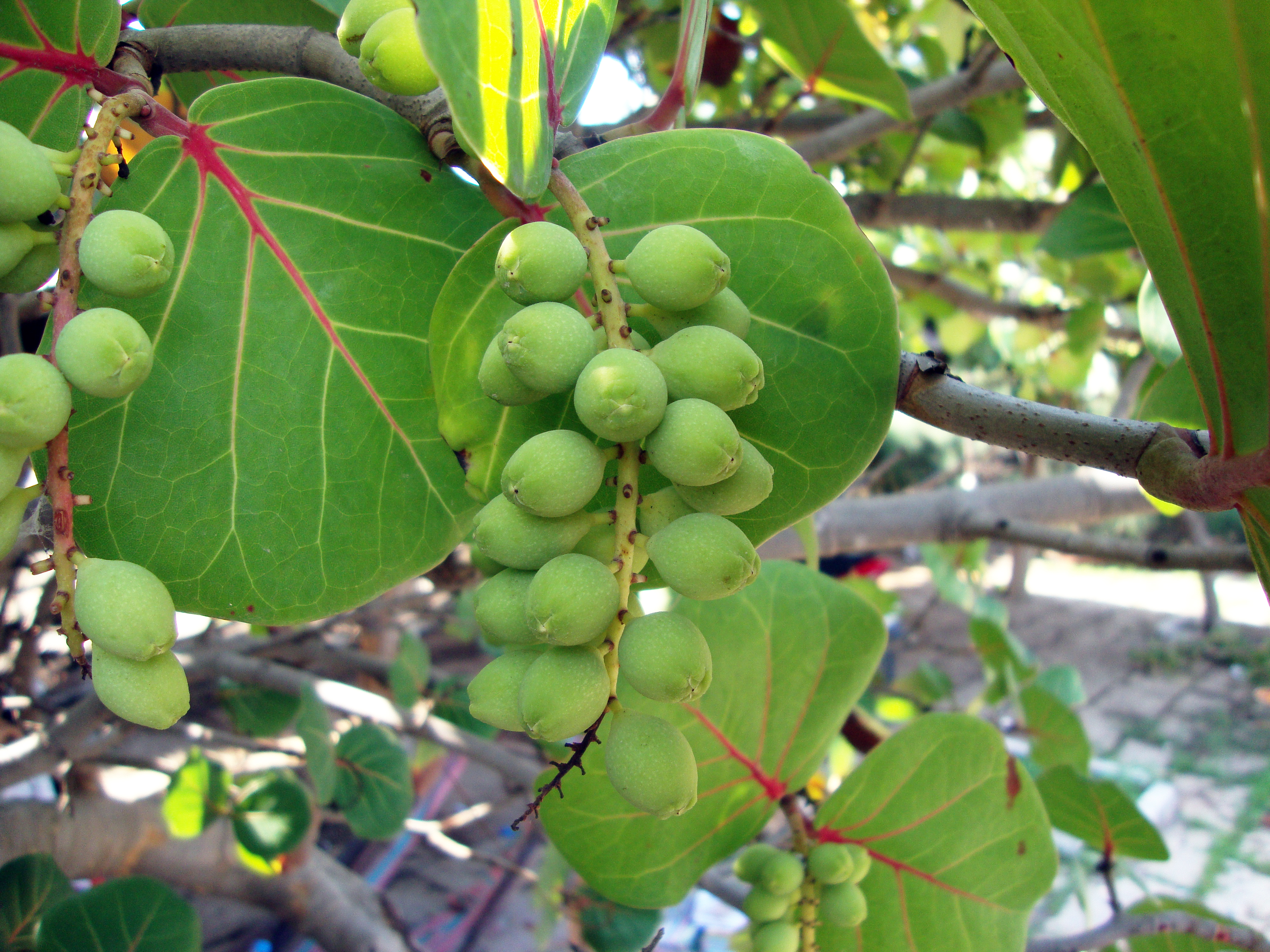

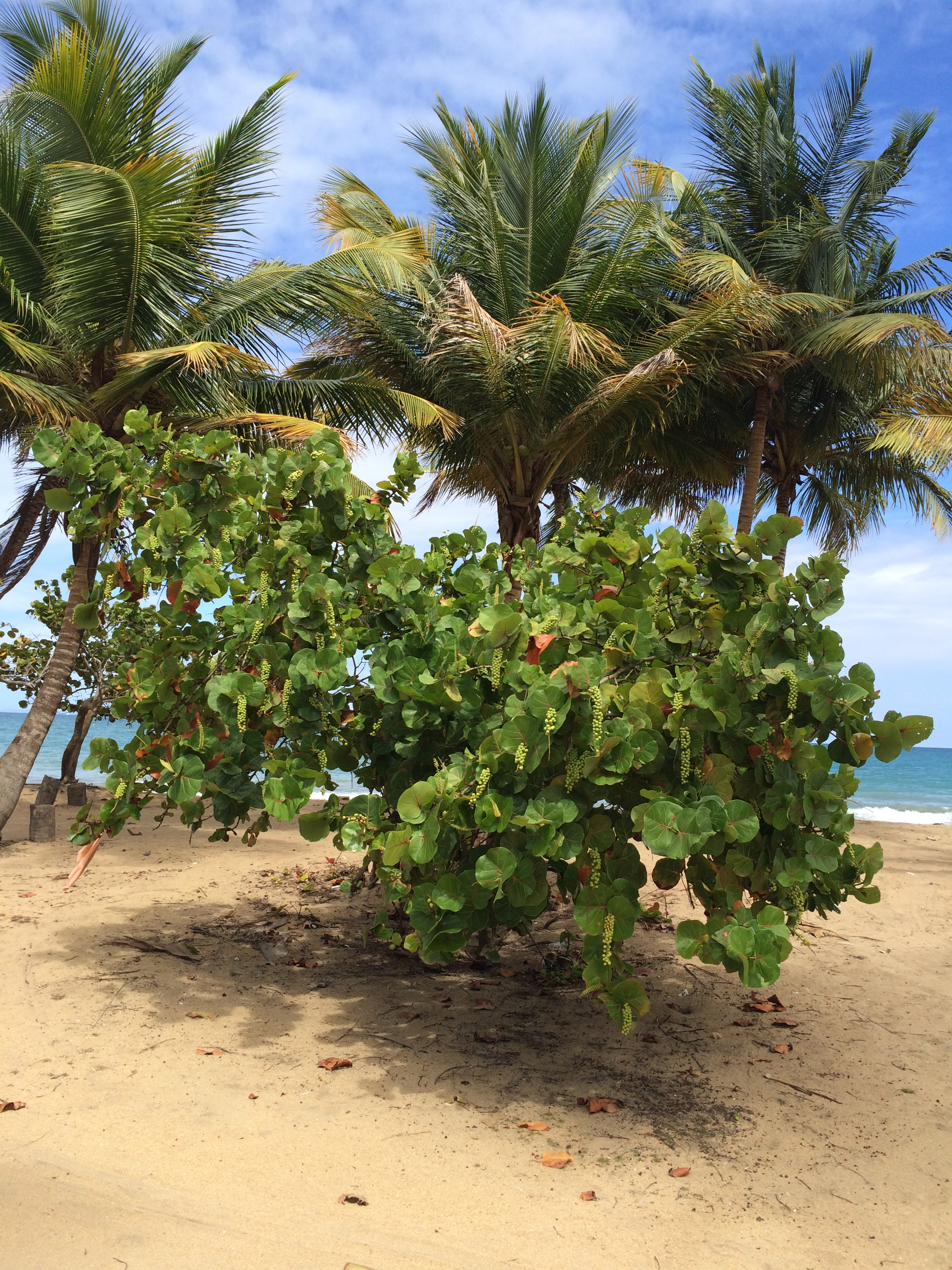
Seagrape (Coccoloba uvifera) shrub at Playa Lucia, Yabucoa, Puerto Rico.

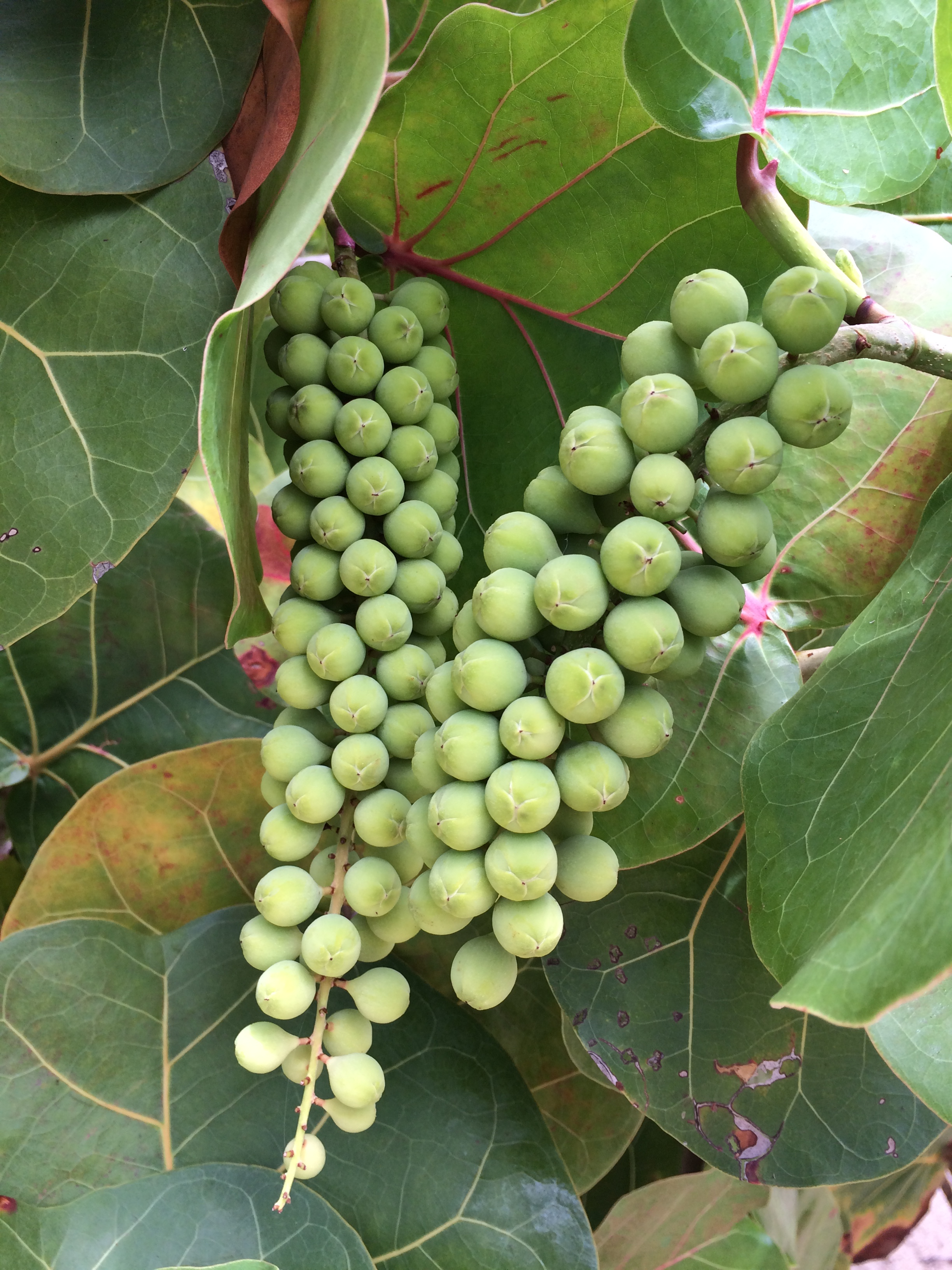
Seagrape (Coccoloba uvifera) fruit at Playa Lucia, Yabucoa, Puerto Rico.

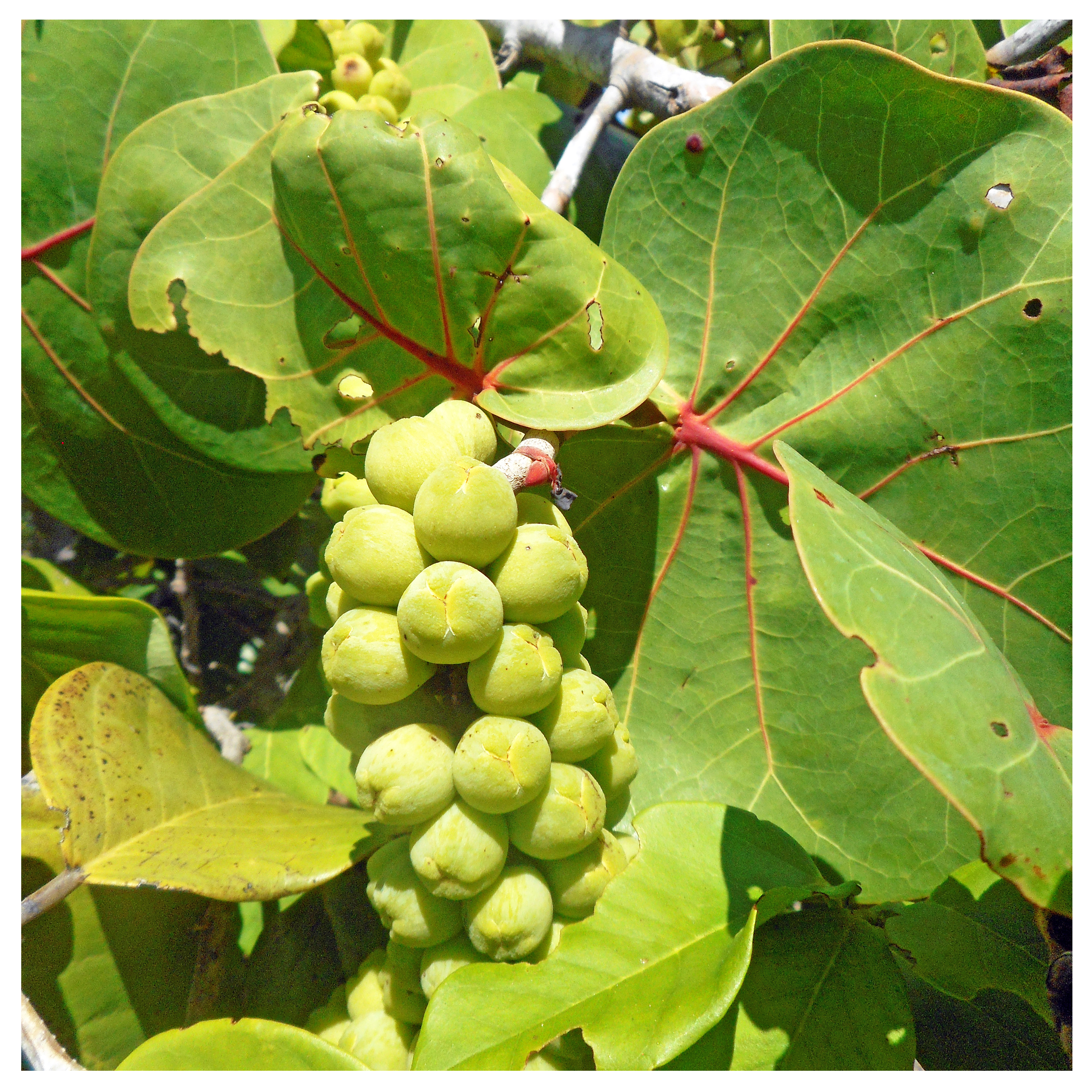
Green fruit

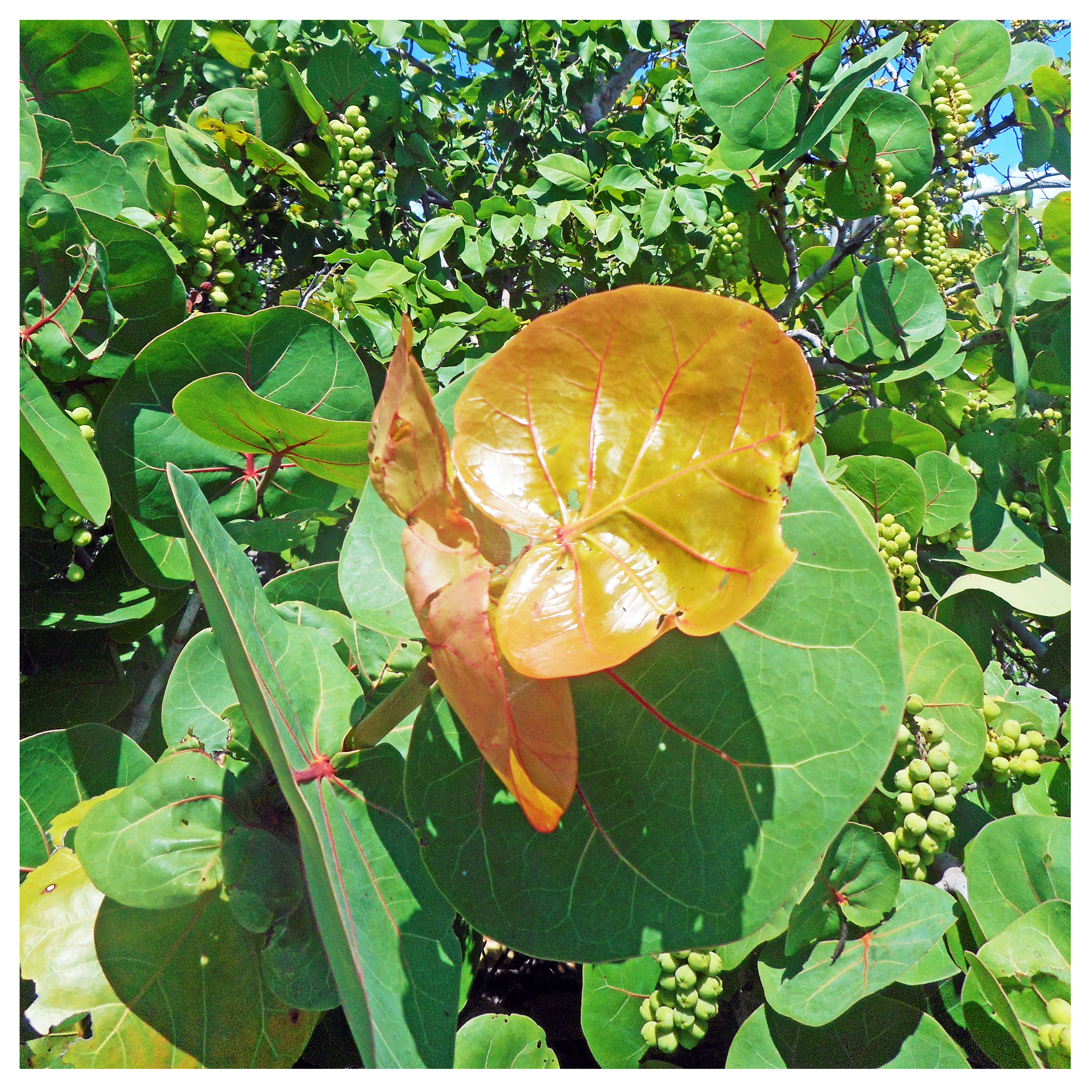
Young leaf

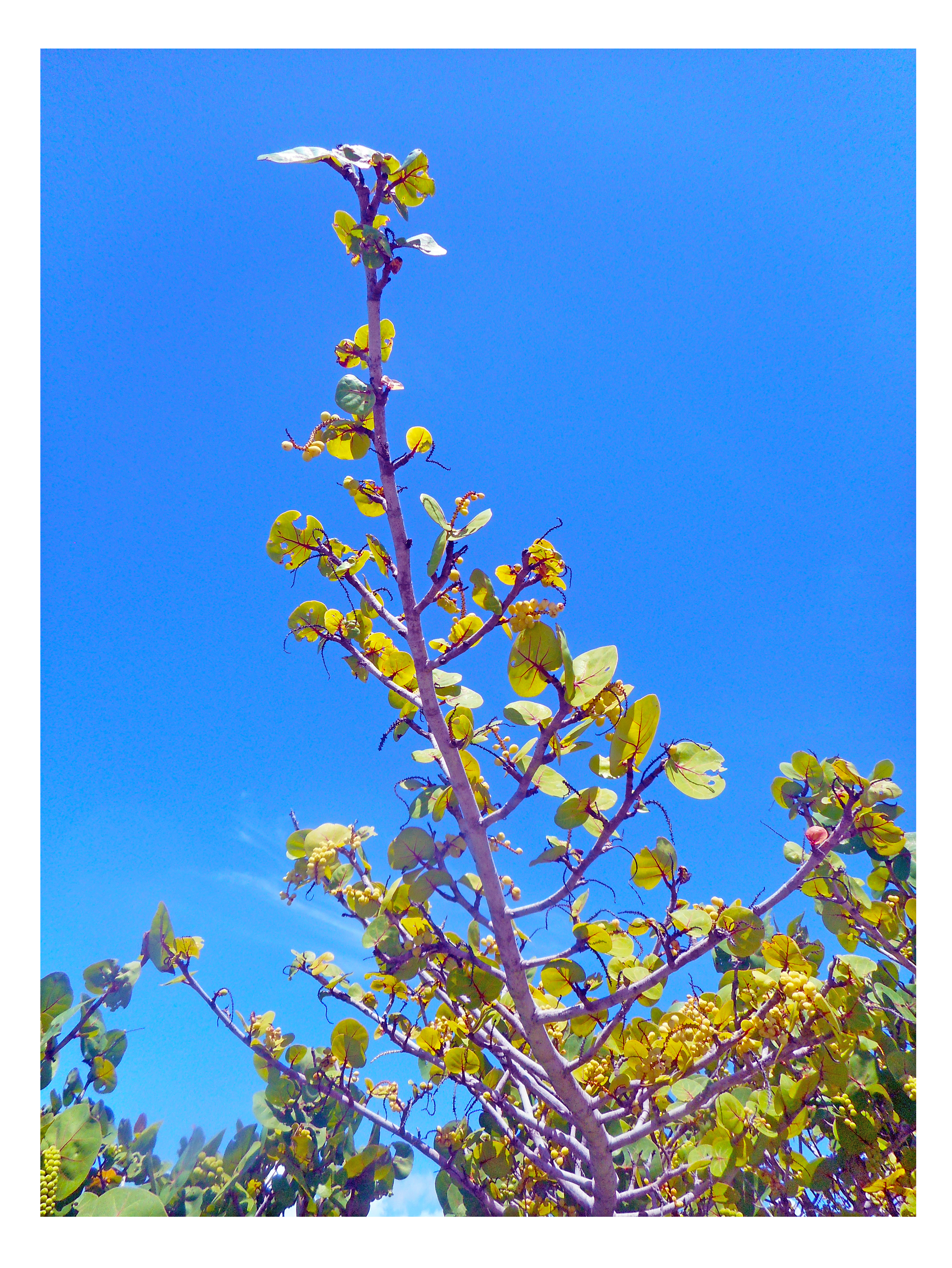
Branch with young leaves

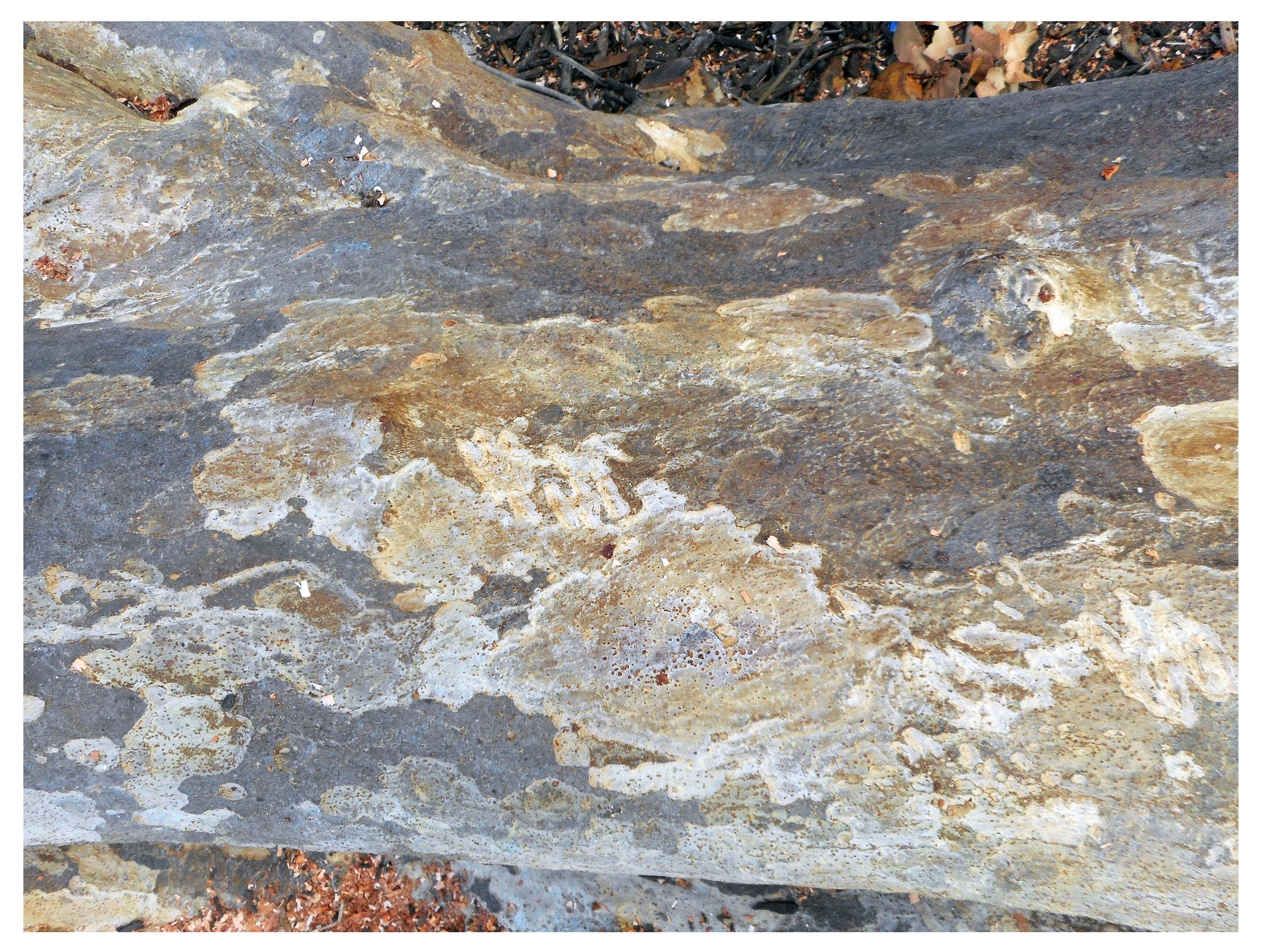
Seagrape tree bark

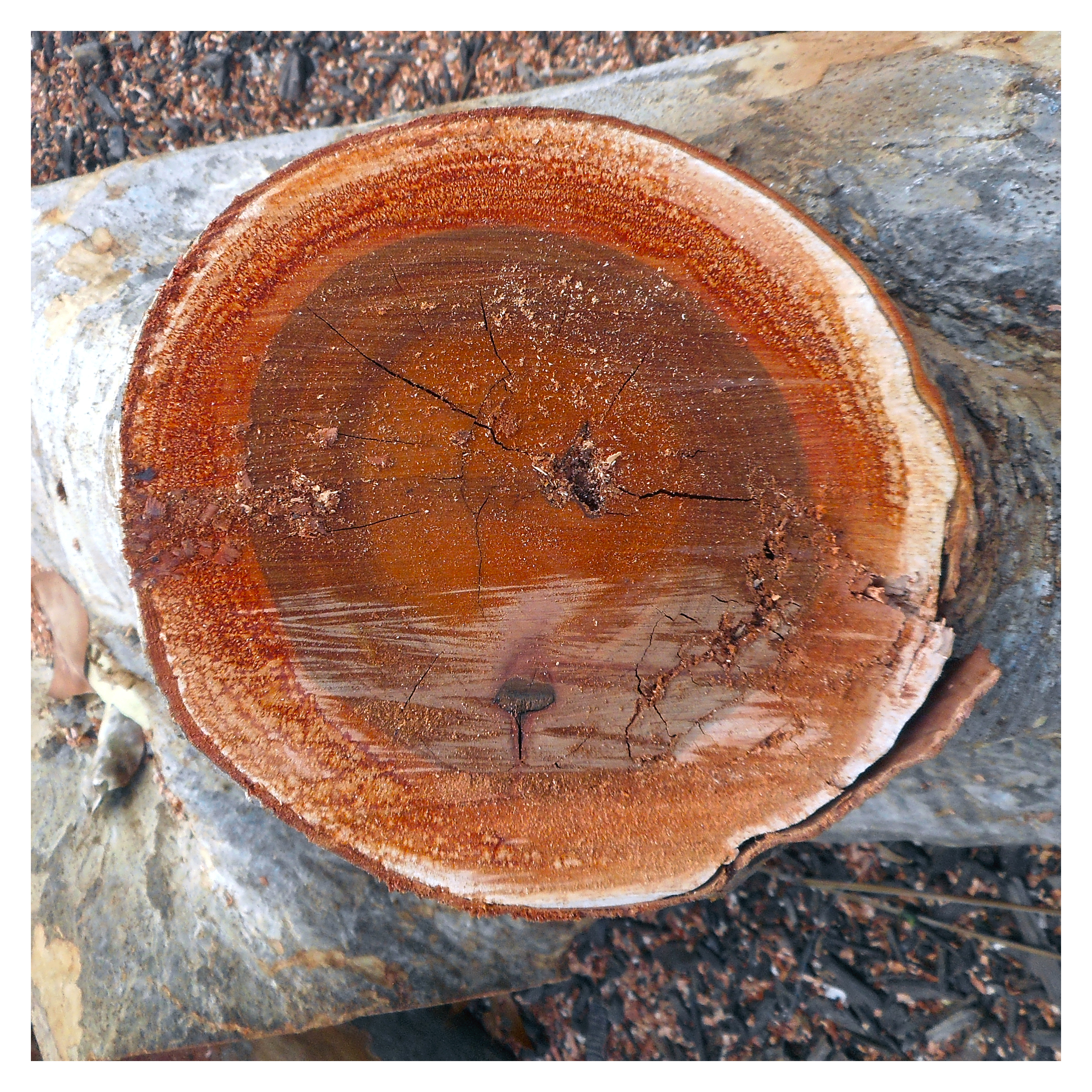
Seagrape tree branch transverse cut

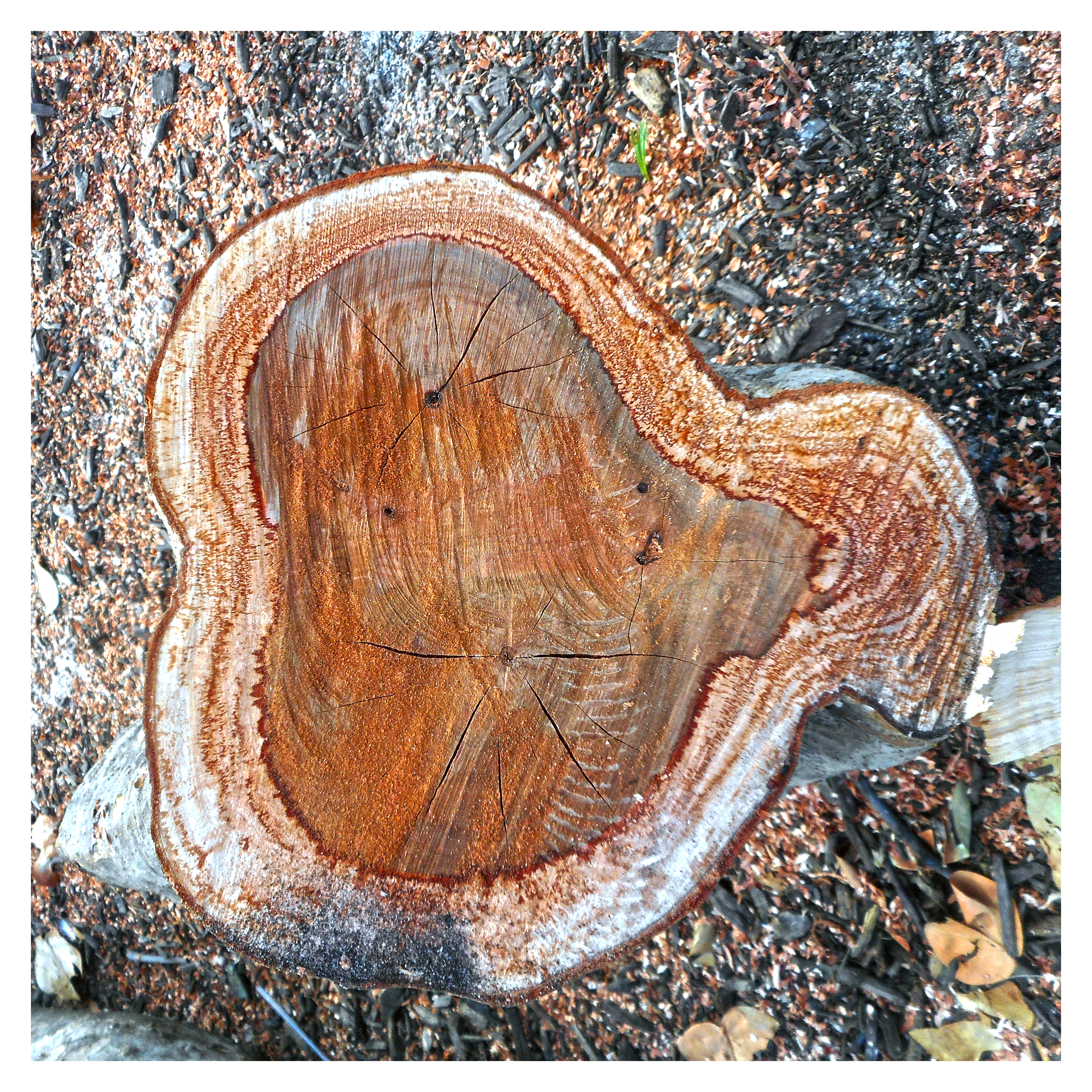
Tree trunk transverse cut showing ring growth

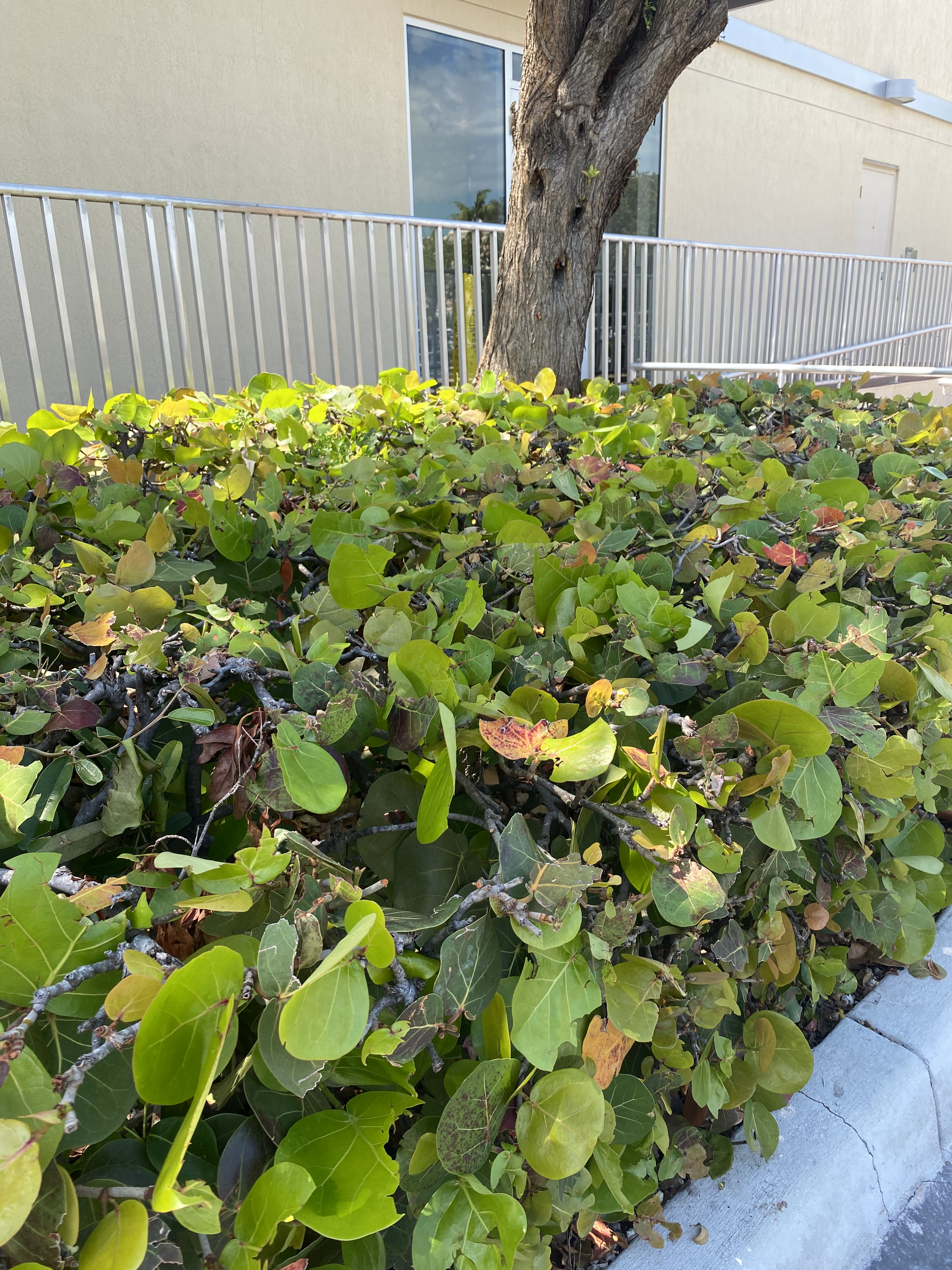
Sea grape hedge

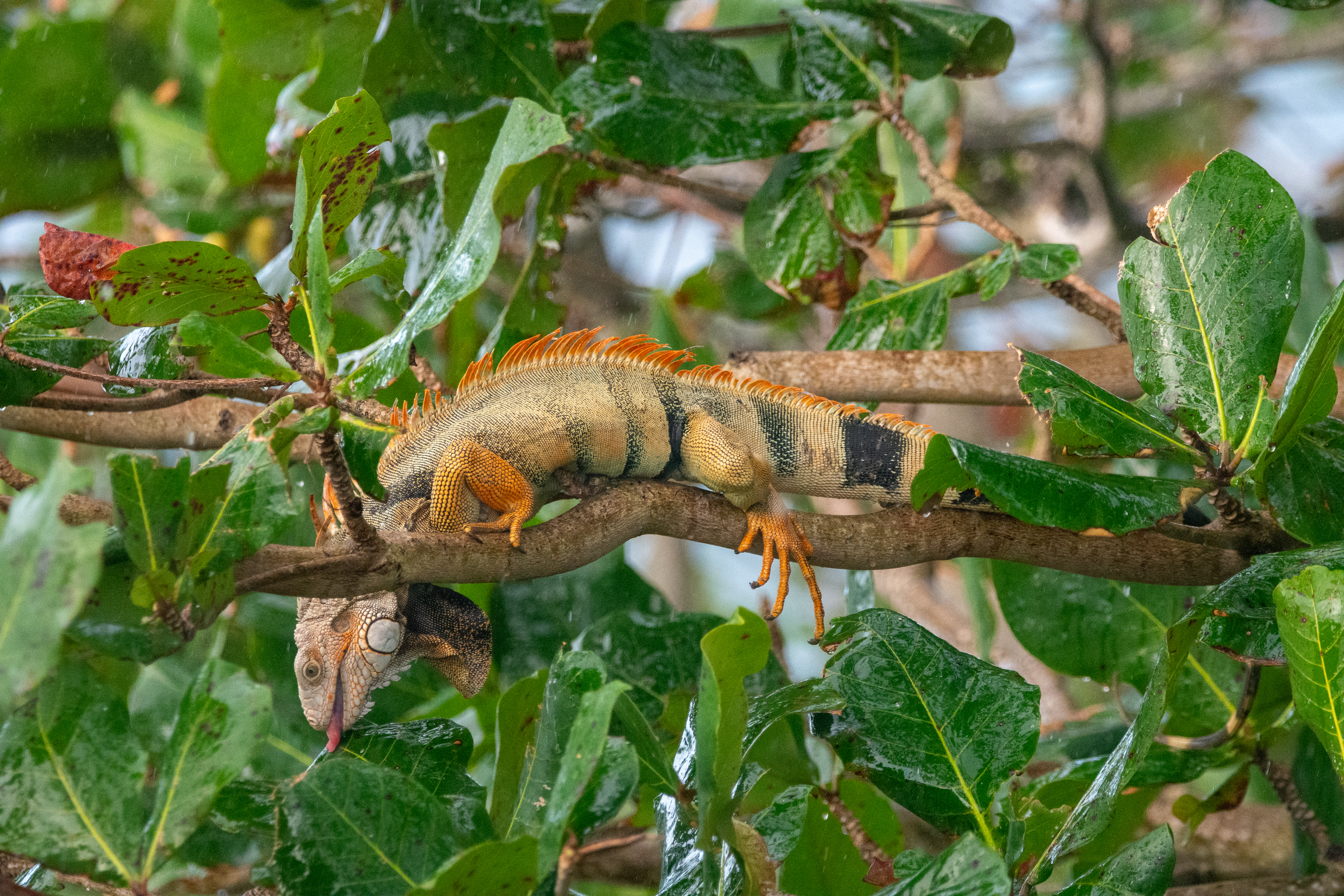
Leaves are used by the invasive Green iguana to collect water during storms
