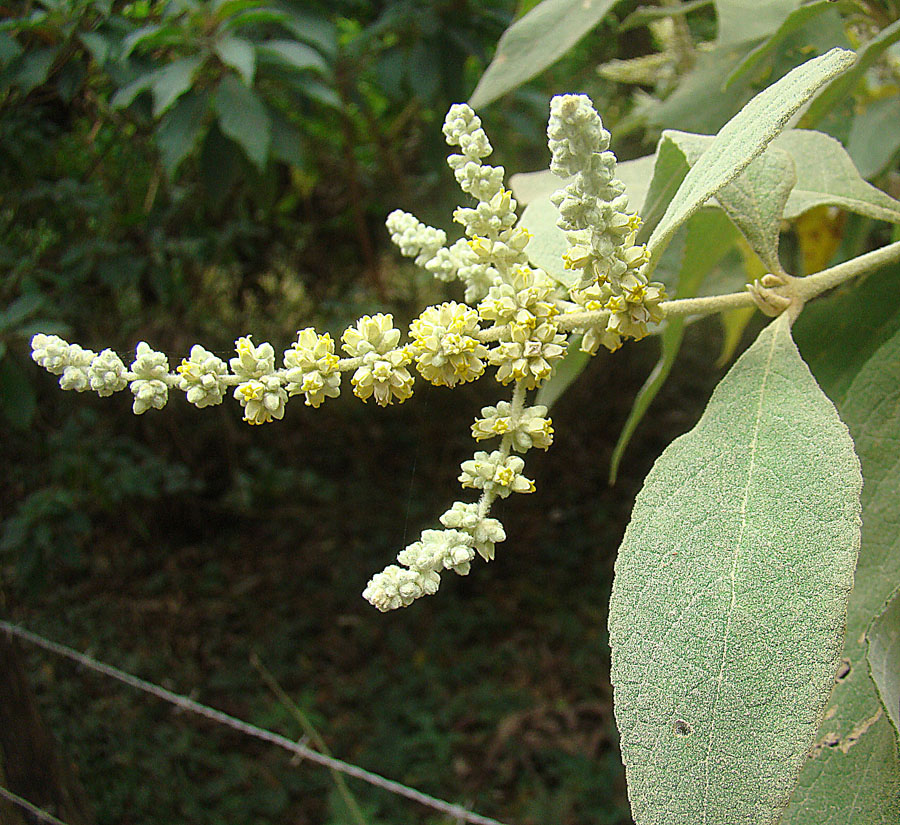

Conservation status
- Least Concern (IUCN 3.1)

Scientific classification
- Kingdom: Plantae
- Clade: Tracheophytes
- Clade: Angiosperms
- Clade: Eudicots
- Clade: Asterids
- Order: Lamiales
- Family: Scrophulariaceae
- Genus: Buddleja
- Species: B. americana

Binomial name
- Buddleja americana L.

Synonyms
- Buddleja callicarpoides Kunth; Buddleja cana Willd.; Buddleja dentata Kunth; Buddleja floribunda Kunth; Buddleja occidentalis L.; Buddleja spicata Ruíz & Pav.; Buddleja verbascifolia Kunth; Buddleja americana var. albiflora M.Gómez; Buddleja americana var. rothschulii Loes.

= Buddleja americana =

Species of plant

Buddleja americana is the most widespread of all the Buddleja species native to the Americas, its range extending south from Tamaulipas, Mexico, through Central America and much of the West Indies into South America, reaching eastward to Venezuela, westward as far as the Galapagos, and south to Bolivia. It occurs at elevations from sea level to 2500 m, in a variety of habitats, including cloud forest, mountain savanna, pine–oak forest, and rocky slopes near rivers. It also invades fields and roadsides.

The species was originally named and described by Linnaeus in 1753.

== Description ==
B. americana is a trioecious shrub, 2–5 m tall with light brown fissured bark. The young branches are sub quadrangular, and tomentose, bearing leaves which vary greatly in size, shape and indumentum. The inflorescences are 5–25 cm long, with one or two orders of branches. The flowers are borne in cymules, the short (< 2.5 mm) corollas yellow inside and white outside. Unlike many American species of Buddleja, which are often diploid, B. americana is tetraploid (2n = 76).

== Cultivation ==
The species is not cold hardy, and quickly killed by temperatures only marginally below freezing. Hardiness: USDA zone 9.
