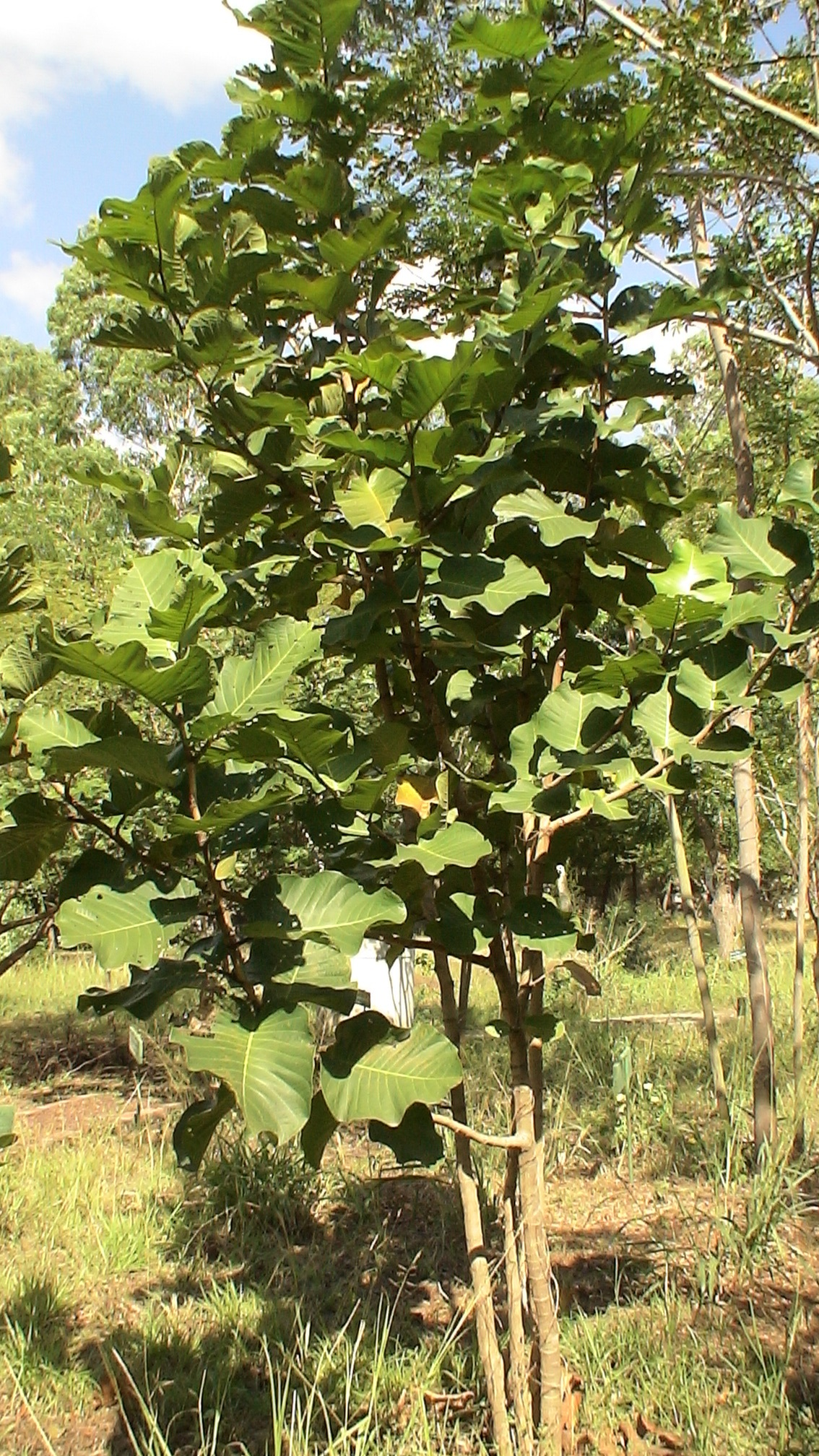

Scientific classification
- Kingdom: Plantae
- Clade: Tracheophytes
- Clade: Angiosperms
- Clade: Eudicots
- Order: Caryophyllales
- Family: Polygonaceae
- Genus: Coccoloba
- Species: C. caracasana

Binomial name
- Coccoloba caracasana Meisn.

= Coccoloba caracasana =

Species of plant

Coccoloba caracasana (from Greek kokkolobis, the ancient name given to a vine by the appearance of its fruit) is a tree in the family Polygonaceae. It is known by the common name papaturro.

== General description ==
=== Vegetative ===
This is a small to medium tree, often with multiple trunks, puberulent to glabrescent stems. The leaves are broadly oblong or suborbicular, rounded to truncate to subcordate at the base.

=== Reproductive ===
The flowers are small, greenish and fragrant, arranged in racemose inflorescences clustered in terminal and lateral spikes. The fruit is an achene with a semi-pulpous edible flesh.

=== Economic and ecological aspects ===
The distribution of this tree ranges from Guatemala to Panama and northern South America, where it is most common in the Pacific regions. It prefers sandy, loose and wet soil; it may be found along rivers. Economically, the species is useful for its edible fruit. The wood is used as firewood and for poles. The foliage is ornamental and hung for shade.
