= Coccoloba cereifera =

Scientific classification
- Kingdom: Plantae
- Clade: Embryophytes
- Clade: Tracheophytes
- Clade: Spermatophytes
- Clade: Angiosperms
- Clade: Eudicots
- Order: Caryophyllales
- Family: Polygonaceae
- Genus: Coccoloba
- Species: C. cereifera

Binomial name
- Coccoloba cereifera Schwacke

Species of flowering plant

Coccoloba cereifera is a rare species of flowering plant in the knotweed or buckwheat family Polygonaceae. The species is restricted to a single mountain, the Serra do Cipó, in southern Brazil. The species is notable for its expression of a trioecious sexual system.
