= Lundell =

Lundell is a Swedish surname. Notable people with the surname include:

- Anton Lundell (born 2001), Finnish ice hockey player
- Arvid Lundell (1899–1984), Canadian politician
- Cyrus Longworth Lundell, American botanist
- Einar Lundell, Swedish ice hockey player
- Frida Lundell, Swedish missionary
- Johan August Lundell, Swedish linguist
- Karl Gustav Johanson Lundell, Russian silversmith
- Ove Lundell, Swedish motocross racer
- Per Lundell, Swedish ice hockey player
- Ricky Lundell, American jiu-jitsu wrestler
- Ulf Lundell, Swedish writer, poet, songwriter, composer, musician and artist

== See also ==
- Lundell Settlement, the result of a class action taken against Dell Computers
