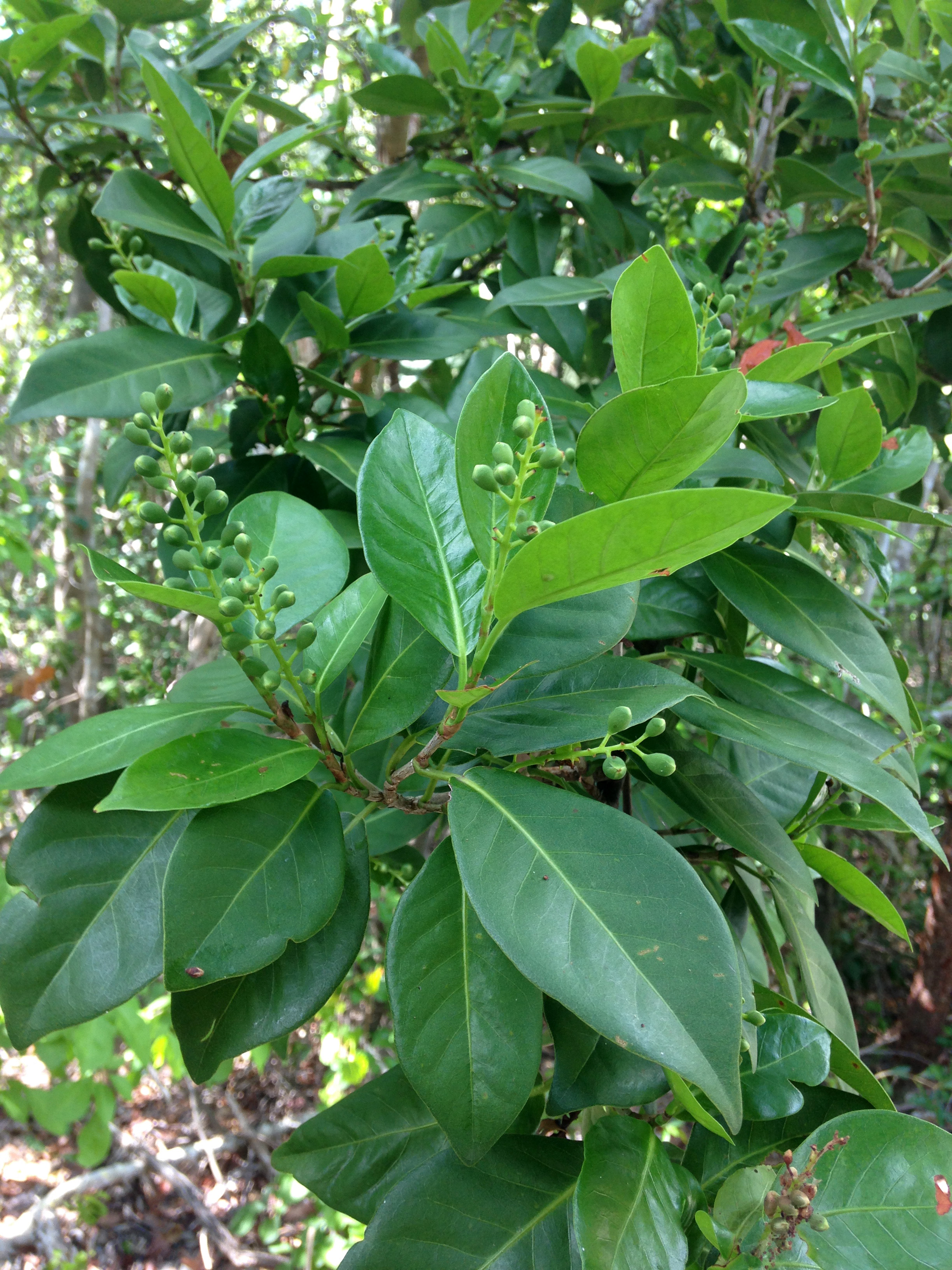

Conservation status
- Least Concern (IUCN 3.1)

- Secure (NatureServe)

Scientific classification
- Kingdom: Plantae
- Clade: Tracheophytes
- Clade: Angiosperms
- Clade: Eudicots
- Order: Caryophyllales
- Family: Polygonaceae
- Genus: Coccoloba
- Species: C. diversifolia

Binomial name
- Coccoloba diversifolia Jacq.

= Coccoloba diversifolia =

Species of tree

Coccoloba diversifolia, known as pigeonplum or tietongue, is a species of the genus Coccoloba native to coastal areas of the Caribbean, Central America (Belize, Guatemala), southern Mexico, southern Florida (coastal regions from Cape Canaveral to the Florida Keys) and the Bahamas.

== Description ==
Pigeonplum is a small to medium-sized tree growing to 10 m (rarely to 18 m) tall. The bark is light gray, smooth, and thin but may become scaly on the largest trees. The leaves are 3–13 cm long and 1–7 cm broad, smooth edged, wavy, oval to oblong, rounded or pointed on the ends, leathery, brighter green above and paler below; leaves on young plants and root sprouts are larger than those on mature plants.

The numerous, inconspicuous flowers appear on spikes 1.5–18 cm long in the spring (but last all-year long). The fruit is an achene 6–10 mm long surrounded by a dark purple edible fleshy perianth, ripening in the fall. The tree is unable to survive hard frost. It is resistant to high winds, salt and drought.

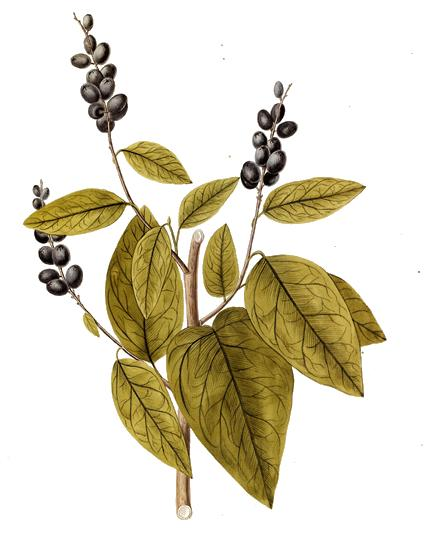
Illustration by Nikolaus Joseph von Jacquin
