= Karl Gustav Johanson Lundell =

Karl Gustav Johanson Lundell. Born in 1833 in Loppi, Finland. Died 1856.

He has been mistaken as a head workmaster at Fabergé in Odessa. New research by Ulla Tillander-Godenhielm has proved, that the mark ГЛ (GL in Russian Cyrillic) is by an unknown master. Karl Gustav Johanson Lundell never lived in Odessa nor he was a goldsmith or a master.
