= Trioecy =

Presence of males, females, and hermaphrodites in a population

A trioecious species has a mix of all-male (blue), all-female (pink), and all-androgynous (purple) individuals.

Trioecy is a sexual system characterized by the coexistence of males, females, and hermaphrodites. It has been found in both plants and animals. Like androdioecy and gynodioecy, trioecy is a mixed mating system.

== Terminology ==
Trioecy is also called tridioecy and subdioecy.

The term trioecy comes from the Neo-Latin word Trioecia, a former order of trioecious plants.

== Evolution of trioecy ==
Trioecy may be an unstable transient state associated with evolutionary transitioning from gynodioecy to dioecy. In brachiopod species, trioecy usually breaks into androdioecy or gynodioecy. Other studies show that trioecious populations originated from gonochoristic ancestors which were invaded by a mutant selfing hermaphrodite, creating a trioecious population. It has been suggested that chromosomal duplication plays an important part in the evolution of trioecy.

But one study found that trioecy can be stable under nucleocytoplasmic sex determination. Another theoretical analysis indicates that trioecy could be evolutionary stable in plant species if a large amount of pollinators vary geographically.

== Occurrence ==
Trioecy is a relatively common sexual system in plants, estimated to occur in about 3.6% of flowering plant species, although most reports of trioecy could be misinterpretations of gynodioecy. It is rare as well as poorly understood in animals.

=== Species that exhibit trioecy ===
The following species have been observed to exhibit a trioecious breeding system.

==== Plants ====
- Buddleja sessiliflora
- Buddleja americana
- Coccoloba cereifera
- Garcinia indica
- Fragaria virginiana
- Fraxinus excelsior
- Fuchsia procumbens
- Mercurialis annua
- Opuntia robusta
- Pachycereus pringlei
- Pleodorina starrii

==== Animals ====
- Aiptasia diaphana
- Auanema rhodensis
- Auanema freiburgensis
- Hydra viridissima (green hydra)
- Thor manningi (Manning grass shrimp)
- Semimytilus algosus (Pacific mussel)

== See also ==
- Dioecy
- Gynodioecy
- Androdioecy
- Hermaphrodite
- Monoicy
