= Coccoloba tuerckheimii =

Scientific classification
- Kingdom: Plantae
- Clade: Tracheophytes
- Clade: Angiosperms
- Clade: Eudicots
- Order: Caryophyllales
- Family: Polygonaceae
- Genus: Coccoloba
- Species: C. tuerckheimii

Binomial name
- Coccoloba tuerckheimii Donn.Sm.

Species of flowering plant

Coccoloba tuerckheimii is a plant species in the genus Coccoloba. The species can be found in Guatemala, Honduras, Nicaragua, Costa Rica, and Panama.
