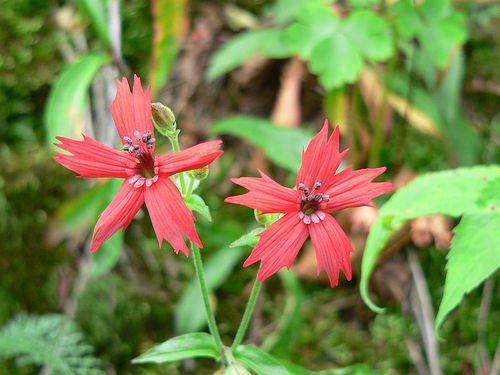

Conservation status
- Secure (NatureServe)

Scientific classification
- Kingdom: Plantae
- Clade: Tracheophytes
- Clade: Angiosperms
- Clade: Eudicots
- Order: Caryophyllales
- Family: Caryophyllaceae
- Genus: Silene
- Species: S. virginica

Binomial name
- Silene virginica L.

= Silene virginica =

Fire pink

Species of flowering plant

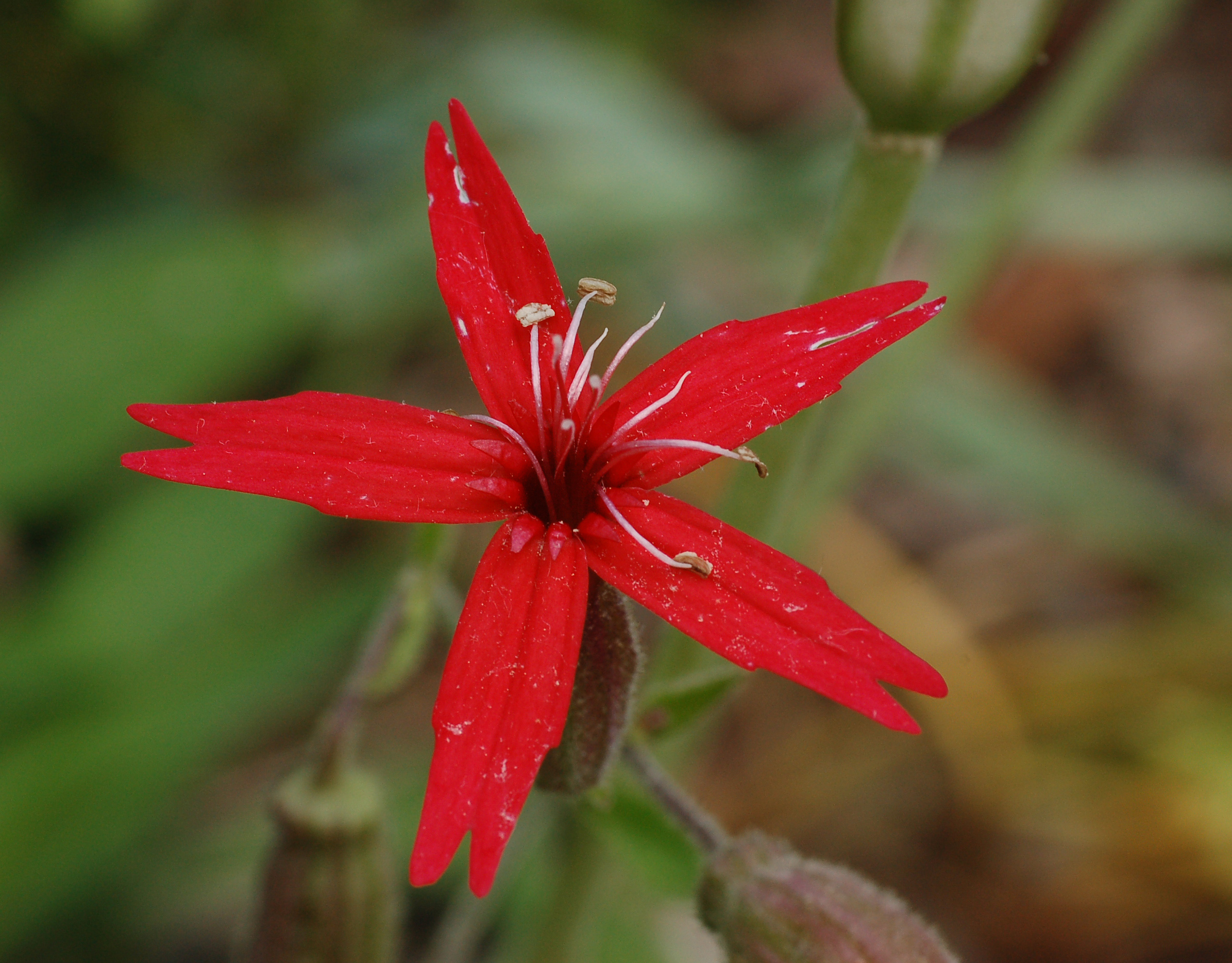
Close-up of a fire pink flower

Silene virginica, the fire pink, is a perennial wildflower native to eastern and central North America that belongs to the pink family, Caryophyllaceae. Fire pink, known for its distinct, brilliant-red flowers, begins blooming in late spring and stays in bloom throughout the summer.

== Description ==
S. virginica is a small, 20–80 cm (8–31 in) tall, short-lived perennial, with lance shaped leaves. Flowering stems begin their growth in late winter to early spring from the center of basal leaf rosettes, growing outward at first, and arching upward as they mature. Stems are reddish on the side receiving the most sunlight, and tend to be greener on the side receiving more shade. They, like the bases of the flowers, are covered in short sticky hairs called trichomes. On the end of each stem is a cyme with three to ten flowers. Fire pink is in bloom in early summer, usually from the end of May to the beginning of July. Each flower is approximately 3-5 cm (1-1.5 in) in diameter, with five notched, brilliant-red petals that extend into a long tube. Each flower has ten pale-red stamens with yellow anthers that form a ring around three pale-red styles arising from the center of the flower. Fruiting occurs in mid to late summer when flowers are replaced by tan, seed-containing capsules. The seeds are gray, kidney-shaped, and 1.5mm in length. The optimal time to identify fire pink is May through July due to its distinctive red flower during this period.

The development of the sexual parts of fire pink are separated in time, with 5 stamens emerging first. Once pollen has been removed, the anthers will fall off and the stamens will become wilted. After this has occurred, the next 5 stamens emerge. Last to emerge in the sequence are the 3 styles, following the loss of anther and wilting of the remaining stamens. These styles displace the second set of stamen from the center of the flower, and the stigmas become receptive to pollen. The dichogamous separation of its reproductive development timing makes fire pink a highly outcrossing species, and reduces chances for self-pollination.

== Distribution and habitat ==
Fire pink grows in central and eastern North America, ranging as far west as Texas, as far south as Florida, and as far north as southern Ontario. While thought of as a fairly common species in the heart of its range, Fire pink is considered rare on the outskirts of its range. It is protected as a state endangered species in Wisconsin, Florida, and Michigan. It is imperiled in Louisiana.

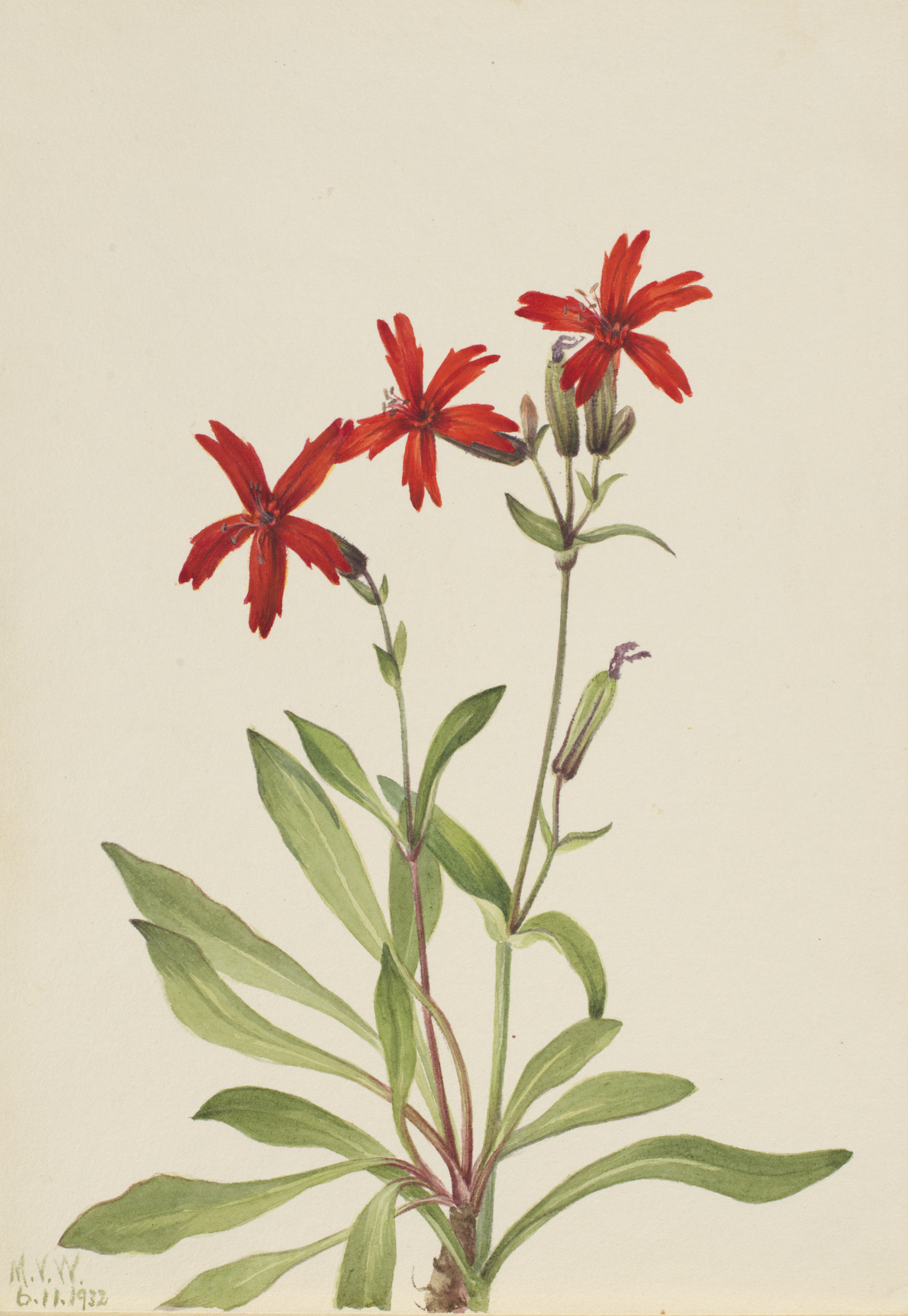
Painting of Silene virginica

The native habitats of fire pink are open woodlands, rocky slopes, cliffs, and road banks. Fire pink's preferred conditions are partial sun with well-drained soils. It can tolerate sunny conditions but thrives under a mix of sun and shade. It is tolerant to drought and high temperatures, and tends to grow in areas with acidic, poorer quality soils.

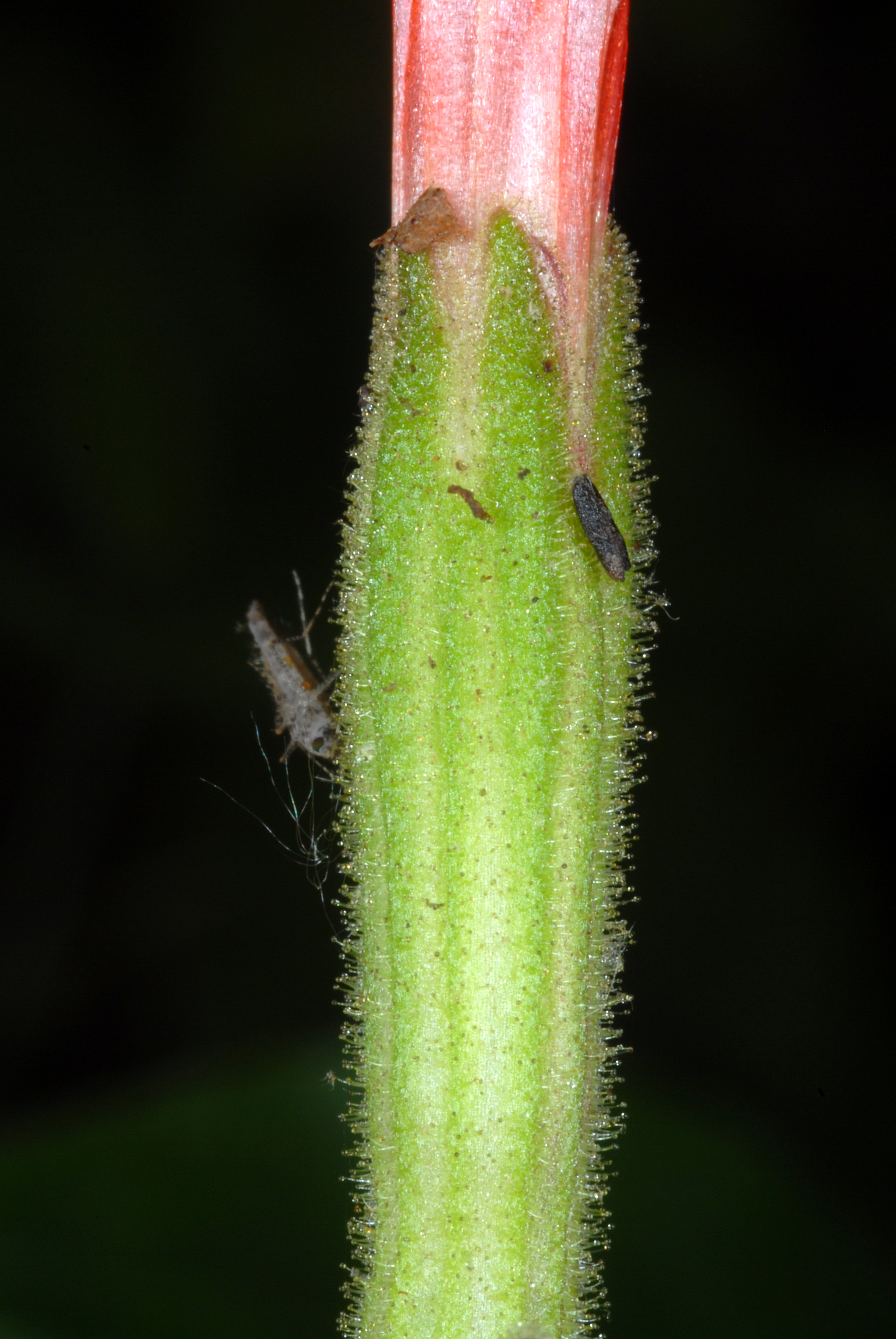
Trichomes on the calyx of a Silene virginica individual

== Ecology ==
Flowering plants have evolved different attractive features such as bright colors, fragrance, and large floral displays in order to attract pollinators. Vibrant red flowers tend to offer nectar rewards, and are especially attractive to hummingbirds because they house this important food source. Fire pink's principal pollinator is the ruby-throated hummingbird (Archilochus colubris). The fire pink exhibits floral traits that are in line with hummingbird pollination syndrome, as it is vibrantly colored, releases no detectable odor, does not have landing pads, and contains nectar deep within its corolla tube. This flower morphology, specifically the long corolla tube and lack of structures that attract or facilitate visitation by other pollinators, mean that fire pink's nectar reward is only available to hummingbirds or, less commonly, long-tongued invertebrate pollinators. Hence, fire pink has a very specialized relationship with the ruby-throated hummingbird, and fire pink relies on this hummingbird species to transfer pollen between flower individuals as it searches for nectar. In addition to hummingbirds, fire pink also forms a symbiotic relationship with other birds who aid in its seed dispersal. Seeds will attract small birds such as sparrows, juncos, and pine siskins.

Another aspect of fire pink's ecology are its sticky glandular hairs. These hairs, which cover the upper stem and calyx, trap insects to prevent them from feeding on nectar and robbing it from the flower without performing pollinator services. This is not a form of carnivory, as the hairs don't release any digestive enzymes, but rather is a form of passive defense in order to protect the flower's developmental structures and prevent the nectar reward from being taken by those who don't aid in pollination.

== Pests and disease ==
Fire pink does not have any serious problems with disease or pests. However, it can occasionally be affected by the anther-smut disease Ustilago violacea. When infected, the anthers of diseased plants will appear dark and smutted, but the plants will appear normal in every other way. Diseased plants are sterile and their anthers produce fungal spores instead of pollen. These spores are then dispersed to other flower individuals by pollinators.

== Uses ==
Traditionally, the fire pink was used medicinally by Native Americans and European settlers. The root of fire pink was used by the Cherokee people as a primary remedy for snakebite. Its roots were also decocted and used as a medicine for intestinal worms. Fire pink was used by the Iroquois tribes as an antibacterial medicine. Other tribes say that the fire pink is poisonous.

Modernly, fire pink may be used decoratively in rock gardens or along border fronts in landscaping.

== Etymology ==
The genus Silene comes from the Greek word sialon, meaning saliva. This likely refers to the sticky substance on the stems and sepals that is characteristic of plants in this genus. The species name virginica is Latin for "of Virginia," referring to the state where the fire pink was first identified.

The word 'pink' in the common name 'fire pink' does not refer to the color, but rather the 'pinked' edges of the petals, referring to the jagged or zig-zag outside edges.

== Varieties and related species ==
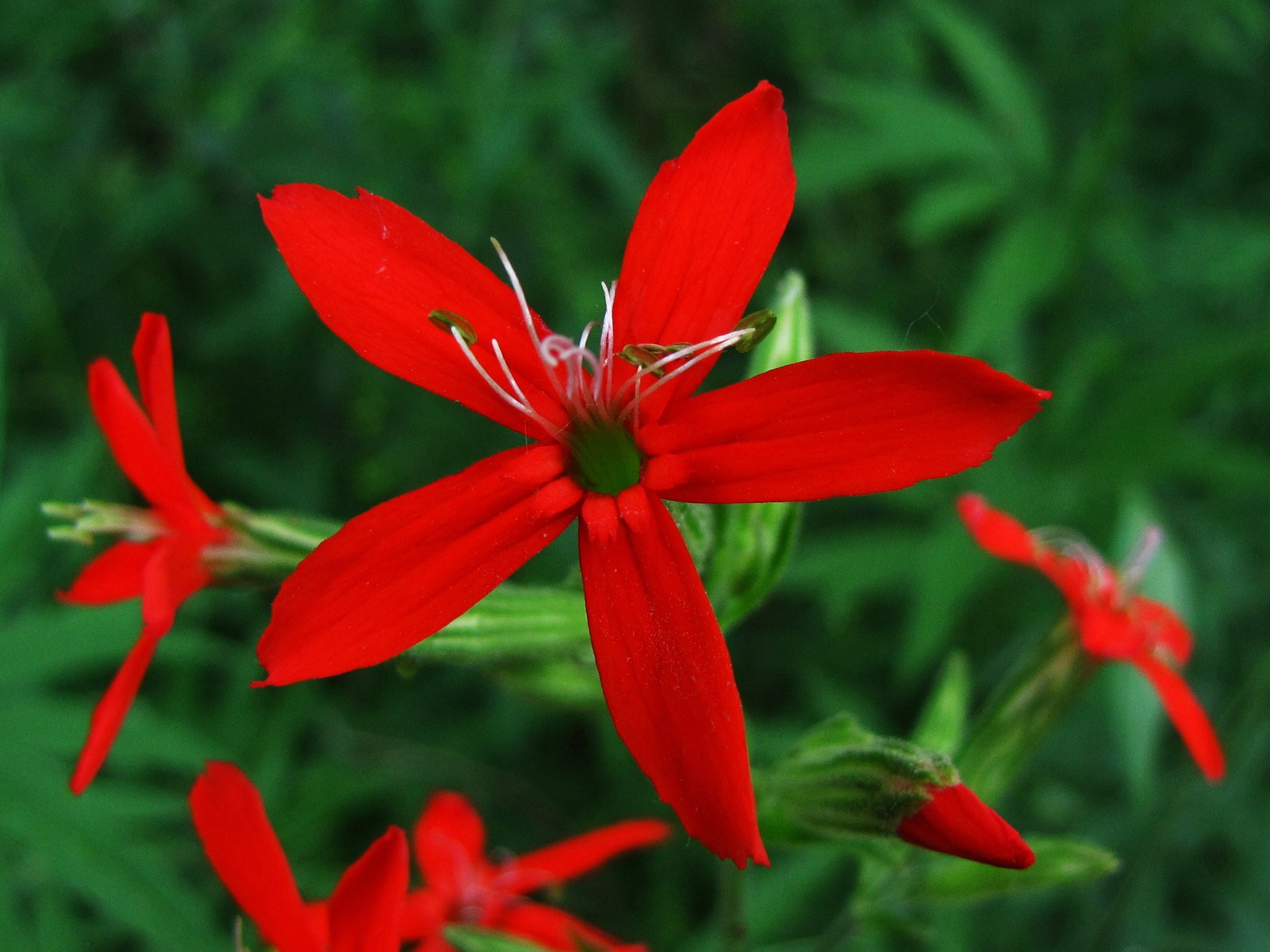
Close up of a Silene regia flower

There are two recognized varieties of fire pink. Most plants of this species are classified as Silene virginica var. virginica; however, an endemic variety occurs in West Virginia as well as parts of South-East Kentucky and East Tennessee called Silene virginica var. robusta. This variety is larger in size than var. virginica, with larger leaves and a longer stem. It flowers in June, up to a month later than neighboring var. virginica populations.

Plants in the Silene genus are commonly known as catchflies due to their sticky-haired stems. A species similar to Silene virginica is Silene regia, the royal catchfly. Its bright-red flowers highly resemble those of the fire pink, but unlike the fire pink, its petals are untoothed or only slightly toothed.
