= Hybrid rice =

Rice crossbred from different varieties

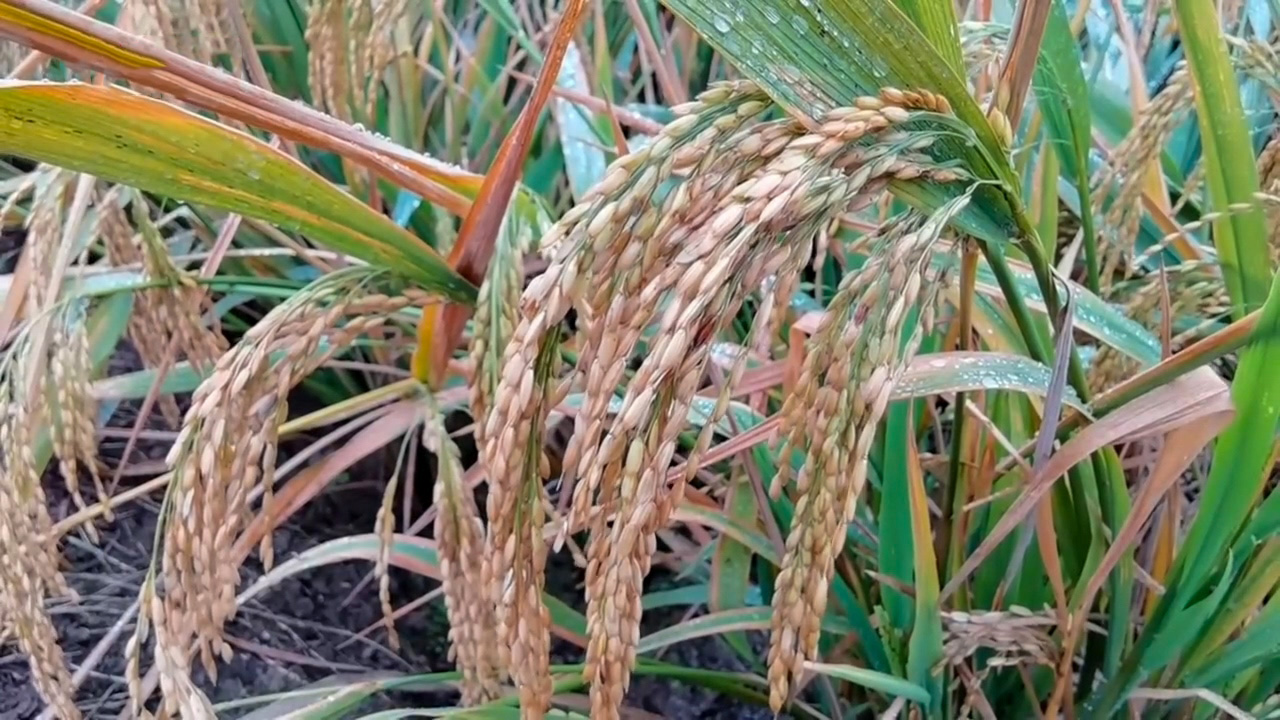
Hybrid Rice

Hybrid rice is a type of Asian rice that has been crossbred from two very different parent varieties. As with other types of hybrids, hybrid rice typically displays heterosis or "hybrid vigor", so when grown under the same conditions as comparable purebred rice varieties, it can produce up to 30% more yield. To produce hybrid seeds in large quantity, a purebred sterile rice variety is fertilized with fertile pollen from a different variety. High-yield crops, including hybrid rice, are one of the most important tools for combatting worldwide food crises.

== History ==
Hybridization has long been used for breeding new rice varieties, such as IR8. The use of heterosis in first-generation hybrid (F1) seeds is well known, but in those cases the F1 seeds are only produced in small quantity. The first academic paper on the application of heterosis to rice production was published in 1926, but its application in rice production was limited because of the self-pollinating nature of rice. In 1974, Chinese scientists successfully transferred the male sterility gene from wild rice to create the cytoplasmic male sterility (CMS) genetic line and hybrid combination. This is the first time the F1 hybrid seeds were used for large-scale planting. The first generation of hybrid rice varieties were three-line hybrids and produced yields that were about 15 to 20 percent greater than those of improved or high-yielding varieties of the same growth duration.

Chinese scientist Yuan Longping (1929–2021), renowned as the "Father of Hybrid Rice", is one of the most famous researchers on hybrid rice. In the 1960s, he made his seminal discovery of the genetic basis of heterosis in rice. This was a unique discovery because it had been previously thought that heterosis was not possible for self-pollinating crops such as rice.

Another Chinese agronomist, Li Zhengyou, developed the Dian-type hybrid rice, and was a pioneer in the research of high-altitude hybrid rice. He published the book Dian-type Hybrid Rice (Chinese: 滇型杂交水稻).

In China, hybrid rice is estimated to be planted on more than 50% of rice-growing fields and it is credited with helping the country increase its annual rice yields, which are among the highest in Asia. Hybrid rice is also grown in many other important rice-producing countries including Indonesia, Vietnam, Myanmar, Bangladesh, India, Sri Lanka, the Philippines, Brazil and United States. A 2010 study published by the International Rice Research Institute (IRRI), reports that the profitability of hybrid rice in three Indian states varied from being equally profitable as other rice to 34% more profitable.

Outside of China, other institutes are also researching hybrid rice, including the IRRI, which also coordinates the Hybrid Rice Development Consortium.

In 2014, during an ethnographic study of surface water management, American researcher Joy D'Angelo discovered a problem with growing the hybrid on terraces: The hybrid is actually so water-efficient that it can put the local mountain aquifer recharge cycle at risk, and cause certain paddies to crumble.

== Strengths and drawbacks ==
Hybrid vigor is expressed during the plant's early vegetative and reproductive growth stages. Young hybrid seedlings have faster root and leaf development and better canopy development; the mature plant has increased total dry matter, larger panicles (the terminal shoots that produce grain), more spikelets (units of flower) per unit area, increased total weight of grains, and, consequently, higher yields. The downside is that farmers need to buy new seeds each season. The grains produced by purebred varieties are almost genetically identical to their parents and so can be stored for planting later. If a farmer tries to plant the genetically diverse seeds (produced by sexual reproduction) saved from a previous hybrid crop, the resultant plants will display widely varying traits, in much the same way that siblings look different, and the ensuing crop will be an inconsistently yielding disappointment. Additionally, the adoption of hybrid varieties continues to remain low in the Global South possibly due to its poor performance in certain environmental conditions.

In China, the hybrid system involving limits on certain characteristics has prevented researchers from finding a way to cure poor resistance against disease and pests. Moreover, hybrid rice has more frequency on having "incidence of stem borer, whitebacked planthopper, leaf roller, bacterial blight, sheath blight, and viral diseases". "downey mildew, false smut, and kernel smut" occurred on hybrid rice more. Therefore, there is a huge increase in pesticide using on hybrid rice than others. For example, in Hunan Province, compared to normal crop, extra 31% of pesticide was used in hybrid rice. Breeding process itself is also a limitation of development of hybrid rice. The cultivation of seed and high-skilled labor cost much money in the beginning, causing 20% of government avenue solving the gap. According to saying from famous Chinese scientist Yuan Longping, two-line systems are needed to build in the future due to the limited plateau area. Most importantly, the lack of genetic diversity has been the major problem needed to solve.

Private seeding company also has challenges dealing with hybrid rice because the process of cultivating them is very time-consuming and expensive. For example, Cargill purchased the seed from the Chinese government in the 1980s, the seed was produced commercially until 1992s. There are still more challenges facing in this area such as "inferior grain quality; inadequate disease/insect resistance in the first generation of hybrids; inconsistent and low seed yield; inadequate supply of pure seed of parental lines; and the high cost of seed." Moreover, the free-sharing IRRI policy has actually limited the development of hybrid rice research. The information of technology is blocked from countries and companies, preventing the way of hybrid rice to success.

Economically and politically, the problem that hybrid rice brought along is still considerable. Farmers lost their breeders' rights because the hybrid seed won't exist after harvest, and therefore rely heavily on specialized seeding companies. Hybrid rice for the whole country is controlled by a few large seeding companies, bringing up potential food safety problems.

Importantly however, the hybrid rice has brought significant improvements to land and water use, access to calories and quality of life.

=== Future Directions ===
For future research, grain quality and resistance against pests and diseases have to be enhanced. Compared with high-yielding varieties, yield of hybrid rice is boosted by enhancing agronomic management. Moreover, "hybrid seed production capability of parental lines" and "development of hybrids possessing higher yield potential than NPT inbred lines" needs to be enhanced. In IRRI-ADB project, more researchers and workers need to be more strength and professional. Seed companies need to invest money on stuff and research, finding the most stable way to seed production and potential way to market. The Government is also encouraged to polish policy or money that can improve or boost the research of hybrid rice.

Additionally, cultivation on terraces should be monitored for crumbling and accumulating soil toxicity issues, as new research demonstrates the hybrid has a propensity for changing a mountain water recharge cycle beyond what is sustainable. Proposed solutions include increasing agroforestry and intercropping the old with the new at strategic locations.
