= Sterile male =

Sterile males are deliberately produced by humans in several species for several unrelated purposes:

- Sterile insect technique – for insect pest control
- Cytoplasmic male sterility – for plant breeding
- Sterile male plant – for plant breeding
