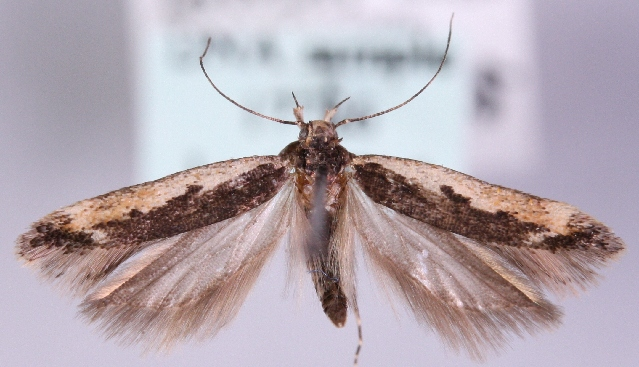

Scientific classification
- Domain: Eukaryota
- Kingdom: Animalia
- Phylum: Arthropoda
- Class: Insecta
- Order: Lepidoptera
- Family: Gelechiidae
- Genus: Cosmardia
- Species: C. moritzella

Binomial name
- Cosmardia moritzella (Treitschke, 1835)

Synonyms
- Oecophora moritzella Treitschke, 1835; Lita moritzella Geyer, 1836; Tinea morizella

= Cosmardia moritzella =

Species of moth

Cosmardia moritzella is a moth of the family Gelechiidae. It is found in Portugal, France, Germany, Austria, Switzerland, Italy, Poland, the Czech Republic, Slovakia, Belarus, Hungary, Romania, Greece, Estonia, Latvia, Lithuania, Finland, Norway, Ukraine and Russia (Ural Mountains, Altai Mountains and south-western Siberia).

The wingspan is 13–14 mm.

The larvae feed on Silene latifolia and Silene dioica.
