= Sex determination in Silene =

Sex determination in the flower genus Silene

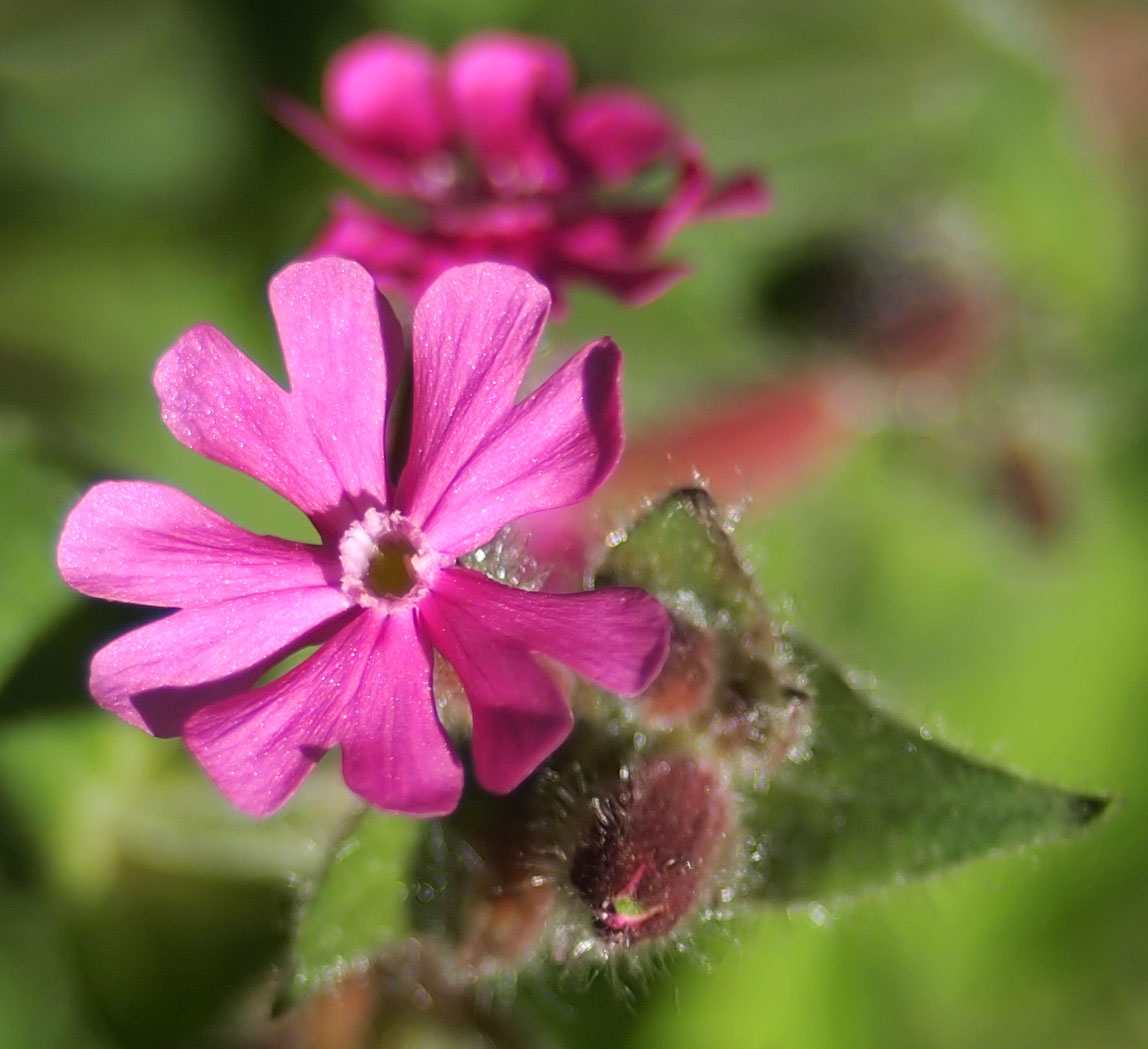
Silene dioica, female flower

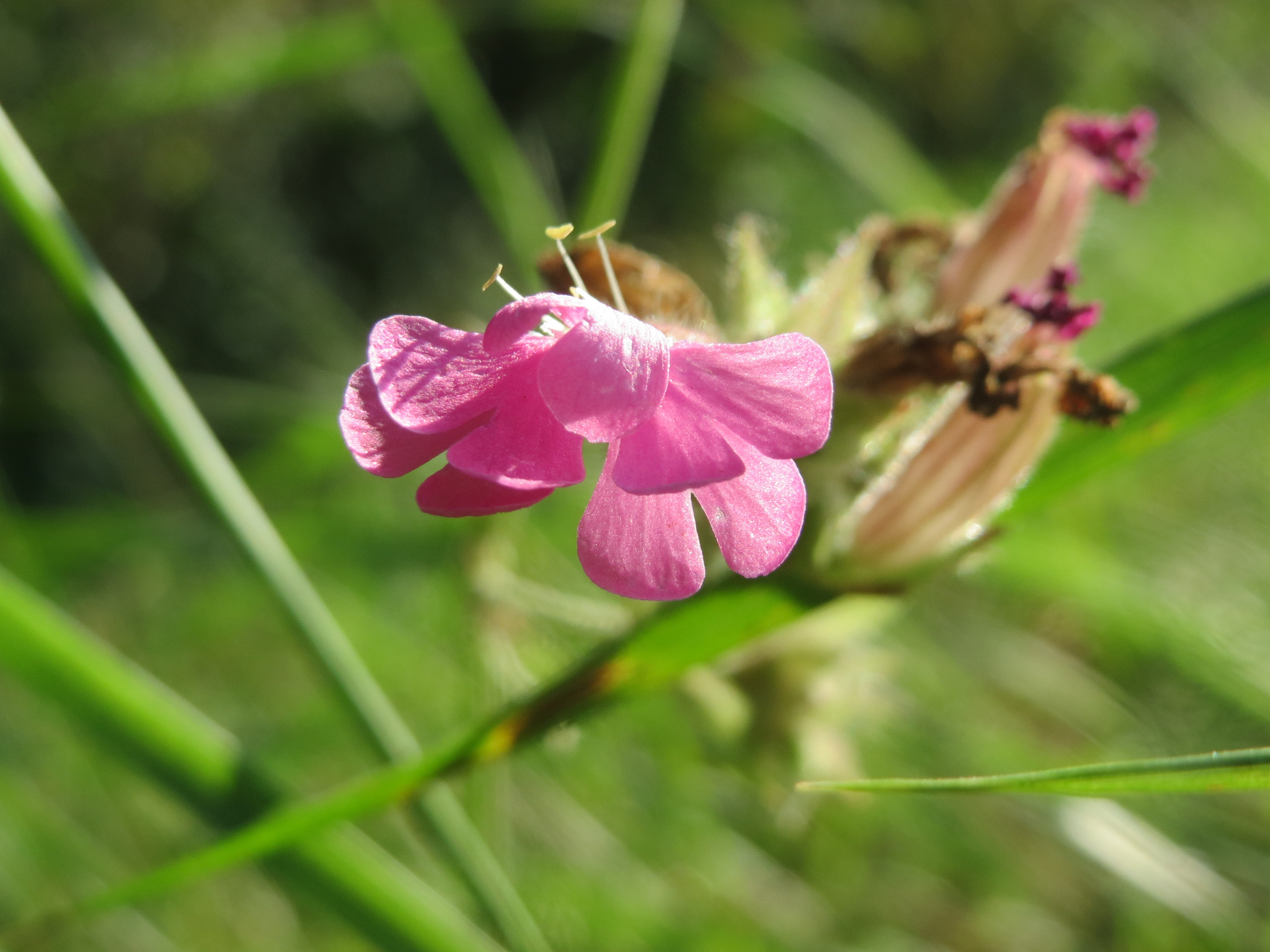
Silene dioica male flowers (etamins) with anthers

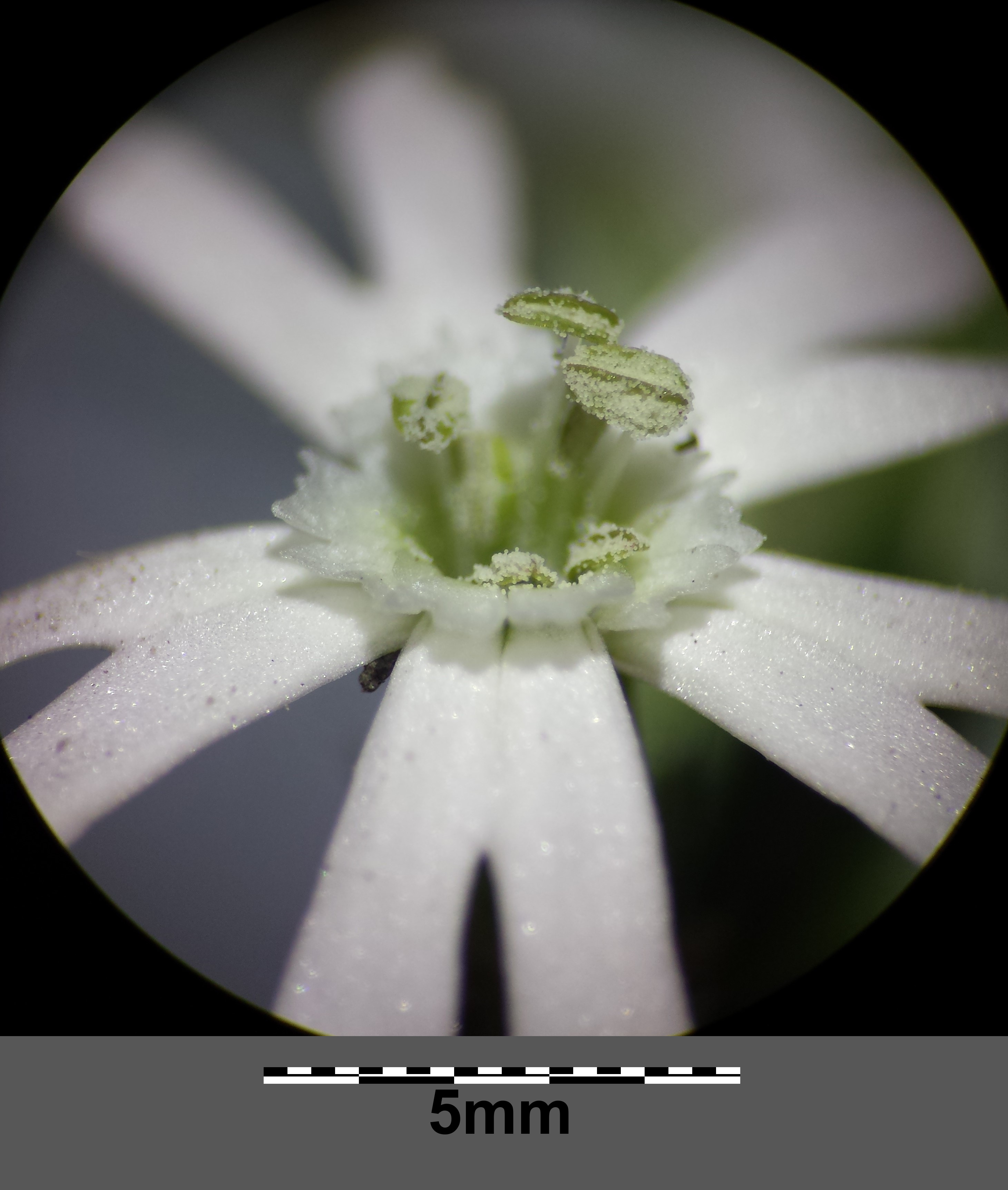
Silene noctiflora, bisexual flower

Silene is a flowering plant genus that has evolved a dioecious reproductive system. This is made possible through heteromorphic sex chromosomes expressed as XY. Silene recently evolved sex chromosomes 5-10 million years ago and are widely used by geneticists and biologists to study the mechanisms of sex determination since they are one of only 39 species across 14 families of angiosperm that possess sex-determining genes. Silene are studied because of their ability to produce offspring with a plethora of reproductive systems. The common inference drawn from such studies is that the sex of the offspring is determined by the Y chromosome.

== Evolution of sex chromosomes ==
Sex chromosomes in plants originate from pairs of autosomes. As these chromosomes diverge from their autosomal ancestor and from each other as a homologous pair, they have the potential to increase or decrease in size due to mutation and recombination. In the case of Silene, the pair of autosomal chromosomes are transformed into heteromorphic sex-determining chromosomes expressed as XY. It is important to recognize that not all species of Silene have this sex determination system. A few, such as S. colpophylla, possess homomorphic sex chromosomes.

Plants with sex-determining chromosomes, like Silene, can develop uni-sexual reproductive structures because of the loss and gain of sex-determining genes. Mutations can cause female sterility, male sterility, or adverse combinations of genes that can lead to monoecy, gynodioecy, and dioecy.

== Species of Silene with different reproductive systems ==
The mechanisms involved in the sex determination of Silene are complex and can lead to various reproductive systems among the offspring. The table below provides only a few examples of these possible systems. Those which are most commonly found within this genus are hermaphroditism (monoecious plant with both staminate and pistillate), dioecy (male and female reproductive systems found in separate morphs), and gynodioecy (existence of female and hermaphroditic reproductive systems among the individuals of the population).

Sexual systems vary across species. Most silene species (58.2%) are hermaphroditic, while 14.3% are dioecious, 13.3% are gynodioecious, and 12.2% are both gynodioecious and gynomonoecious. Trioecy, andromonoecy, and gynomonoecy have also been reported but are extremely rare.

Species Name	Reproductive System(s)
S. latifolia	dioecy
S. dioica	dioecy
S. diclinis	dioecy
S. pendula	gynodioecy
S. noctiflora	gynodioecy, hermaphrodite
S. acaulis	trioecy
S. saxifraga	gynodioecy, andromonoecy
S. vulgaris	gynodioecy, trioecy
S. gallica	hermaphrodite
S. inaperta	hermaphrodite

== Genetics ==
Out of 300,000 species of angiosperm, Silene are among the 5 to 10 percent whose individual offspring can be of different sexes. Hetermorphic sex-determining chromosomes are very infrequent in plant genera; some notable examples that possess them, other than Silene, are Rumex, Humulus, and Cannabis.

All species of Silene that are diploid possess the same number of chromosomes (n=12); males possess sex-determining Y chromosomes that are much larger than the X chromosomes. Recombination generally occurs only when two X chromosomes (XX) pair during female meiosis. Contrastingly, recombination is suppressed across most of the Y chromosomes during pairing in male meiosis (XY). When recombination does occur in XY chromosomes, it is confined to the tips of the chromosome, leaving most of the genetic material in the Y chromosome intact.

=== Importance of Y-chromosome ===
Several studies concentrated on Silene latifolia have shown a correlation between loci on the Y chromosome and the sex that is expressed phenotypically in the flower. Two of these sex-linked genes "promote maleness" (male fertility and male promotion) and one of them codes for female suppression. Therefore, the Y chromosome carries three dominant genes that determine the sexual expression in a Silene offspring. If there are deletions and mutations in the Y chromosome during reproduction, then different sex-linked genes are lost. The different combinations of possible sex-related genes that an individual Silene can have in one Y chromosome are what creates the rich variation of sexual phenotypes throughout this genus.

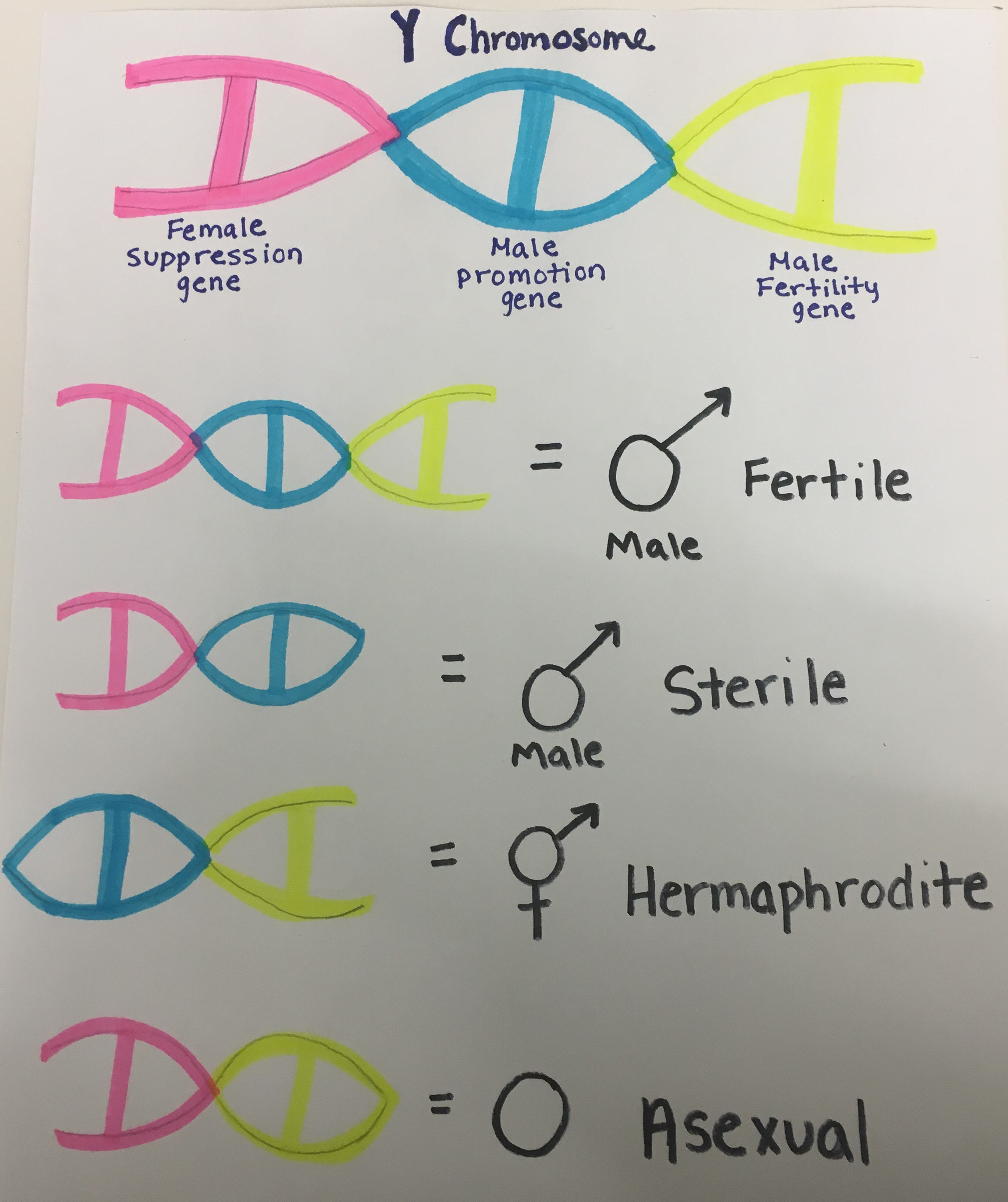
This diagram illustrates the different gene combinations that can appear on the Y chromosome of Silene latifolia. Each combination of genes leads to a distinct sexual expression. Adapted from "Silene latifolia : The Classical Model to Study Heteromorphic Sex Chromosomes" by E. Kejnovsky and B. Vyskot.

== Sexual expression ==
The system for determining sex in Silene latifolia is close to that found in humans because in both cases the Y chromosome determines what reproductive mechanisms will be expressed in the offspring. They differ because there are multiple sex determining genes on the Y chromosome of S. latifolia, while in humans the presence or absence of the Y chromosome strictly determines whether the offspring is male or female.

Different combinations of the genes present in a Silene Y chromosome affect the sexual expression in the organism. For example, there are two genetic variations that can lead to male sterility in S. latifolia: if it possesses two Y chromosomes (YY) or if the Y chromosome possesses the female suppression and male promoting genes. Silene are also susceptible to a type of sexually transmitted infection that causes sterility. Another possible combination includes the presence of all three sex-linked genes (male suppressing, female suppressing, and male promoting) which produce virile male offspring. The flower is hermaphrodite when both male promoting and male fertility genes are present. Lastly, Y chromosomes carrying both female suppression and male fertility genes creates an asexual organism.

== See also ==
- Dioecy
- Gynodioecy
- Sexually transmitted infection in Silene latifolia
