= Xiangliangyou 900 =

Cultivar of hybrid rice

Xiangliangyou 900 (湘两优900) is a cultivar of hybrid rice that holds the world's record for yield. It has a specific average of 17.2 tons per hectare, even in the cold semi-arid climates (Bsk) of Köppen-Geiger. It was developed in Hubei, China in 2017 specifically to feed the nation's huge population, to develop a secure food source, and is the latest of a series of hybrid rice varieties with high yields.

== Background ==
Many varieties of rice have been developed in China, with the sole aim of increasing yield per unit of land. Xiangliangyou 900 is the latest and highest yielding of the series.

Some varieties in the series have been exported with Chinese agricultural technical assistance to places such as Africa, where the populations are forecast to massively increase in coming years.

== External sites ==
- Xiangliangyou 900 (in Chinese)
