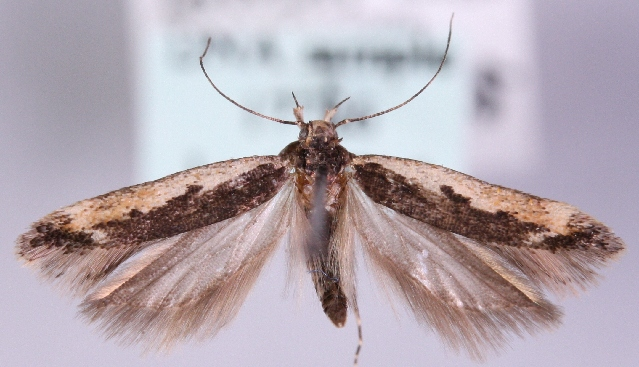
- Cosmardia moritzella

Scientific classification
- Kingdom: Animalia
- Phylum: Arthropoda
- Clade: Pancrustacea
- Class: Insecta
- Order: Lepidoptera
- Family: Gelechiidae
- Tribe: Gnorimoschemini
- Genus: Cosmardia; Povolný, 1965

= Cosmardia =

Genus of moths

Cosmardia is a genus of moths in the family Gelechiidae.

== Species ==
- Cosmardia moritzella (Treitschke, 1835)
