= Li Zhengyou =

Chinese agronomist and politician (1935–2018)

Li Zhengyou (Chinese: 李铮友; July 1935 – 4 April 2018) was a Chinese agronomist and politician. A professor of Yunnan Agricultural University, he created the Dian-type hybrid rice and was called the "father of high-altitude hybrid rice". He served as Vice-Governor of Yunnan Province from 1983 to 1988, and Chairman of the Yunnan Science and Technology Society.

== Biography ==
Li Zhengyou was born in Chongqing in July 1935, with his ancestral home in Gao County, Sichuan Province. He studied at Southwest Agricultural University (now part of Southwest University) from 1956 to 1960, and joined the faculty of Yunnan Agricultural University in August 1961. Starting as a lecturer, he later became a professor and director of the university's Rice Research Institute.

Li created the Dian (or Yunnan)-type hybrid rice, and was a pioneer in the research of high-altitude hybrid rice. His research resulted in substantial increases in rice yields in the plateau province of Yunnan, raising farmer incomes. Consequently, he was awarded the State Natural Science Award in 1978 and the Fifth Yuan Longping Prize in Agricultural Sciences. He was also named a model worker of Yunnan in 1983. His research is published in the book Dian-type Hybrid Rice (滇型杂交水稻).

From April 1983 to April 1988, he served as Vice-Governor of Yunnan Province and Chairman of the Yunnan Science and Technology Society. He joined the China Zhi Gong Party in May 1991, and served as a member of the 10th and 11th Central Committees of the party. He was a member of the 6th National People's Congress, and a member of the 8th, 9th, and 10th Chinese People's Political Consultative Conference (CPPCC). He served on the Standing Committee of the 9th CPPCC.

Li retired in June 2009.

== Death ==
Li died on 4 April 2018 in Kunming, at the age of 82. Yuan Longping, popularly known as the father of hybrid rice, wrote a eulogy praising his contributions to rice research.
