= Microbotryum violaceum infection of Silene latifolia =

Fungal disease of a plant

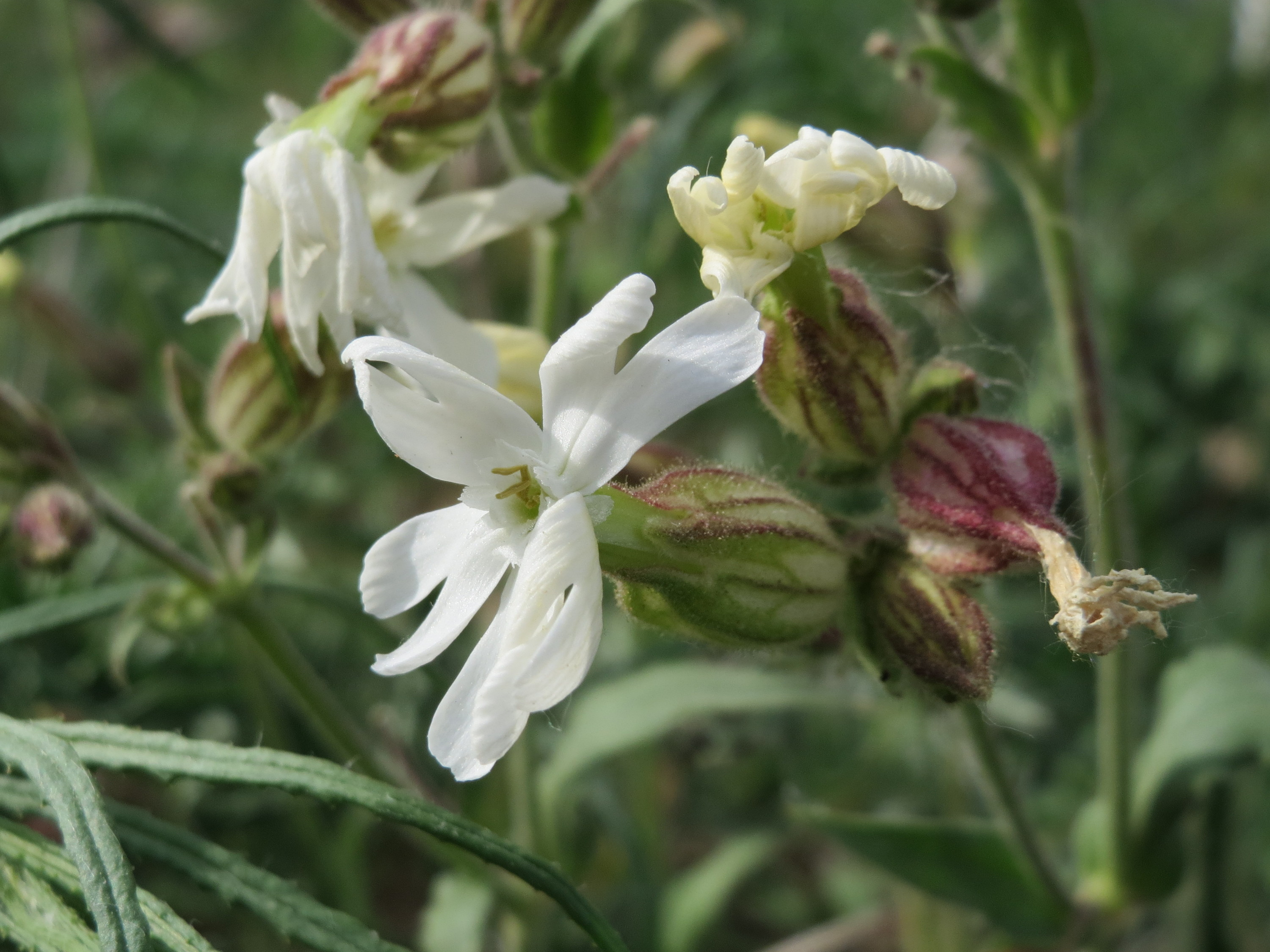
Healthy Silene latifolia

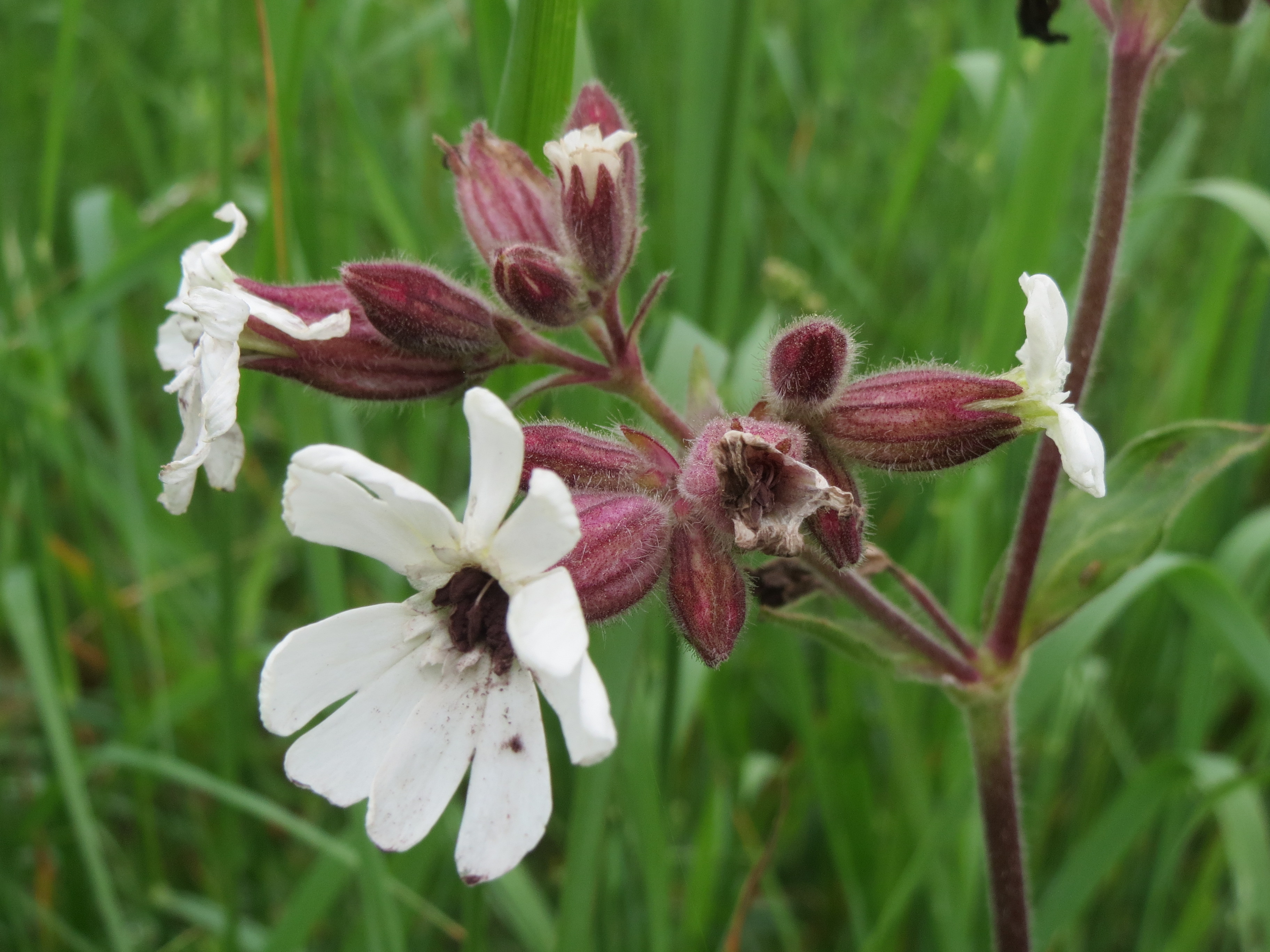
Microbotryum violaceum infection of Silene latifolia anthers

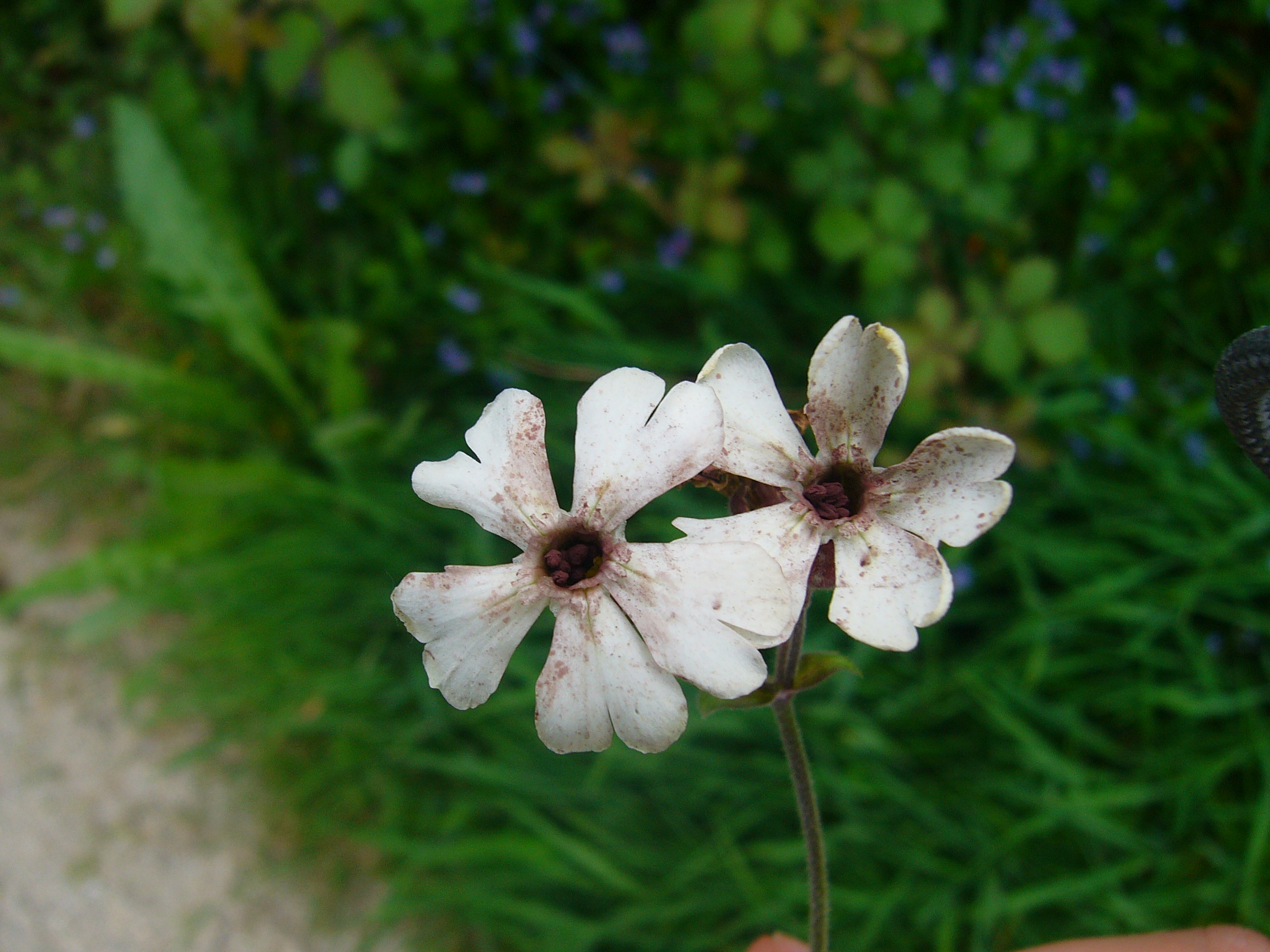
Microbotryum violaceum on Silene latifolia sbsp. alba

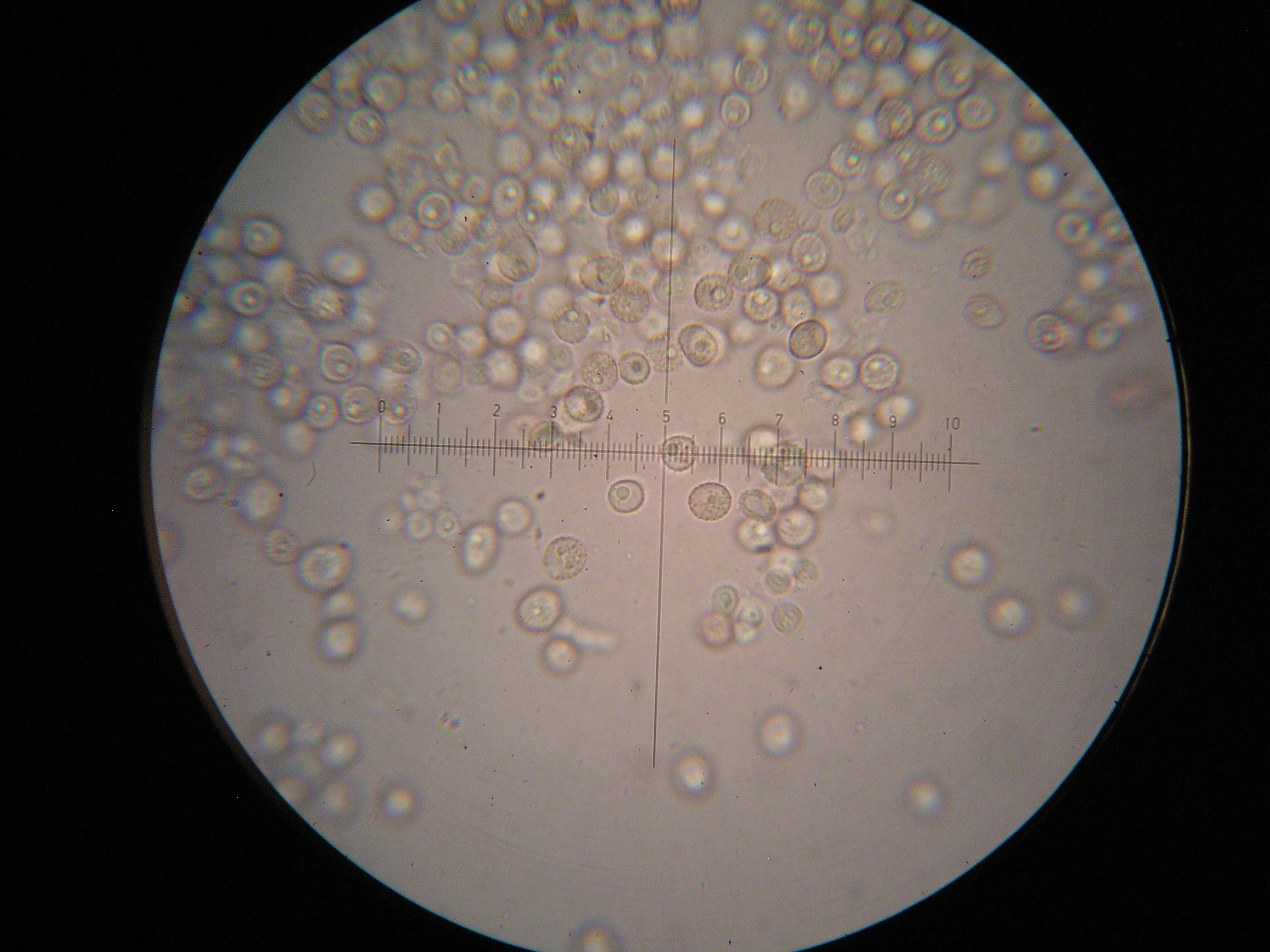
Spores of Microbotryum violaceum

Microbotryum violaceum is a host-specific anther smut (fungus) disease that infects Silene latifolia and sterilizes the host plant. When infected with this disease, the flowers generate pathogenic spores, which can then be transferred to other plants by pollinating insects. Therefore, this disease is sometimes classified as a sexually transmitted infection.

== Smuts ==
They are fungal diseases that can infect different parts of the host plants (i.e. leaves, stems, flowers) and usually create black spores called teliospores in the infected area. Teliospores produce sporidia, white smut, and can survive under harsh environmental conditions. Therefore, the most effective way to prevent the spread of this fungal disease is to remove and destroy the infected area of the plant. Fungicides can be used to control the spread of smut; however, they must be applied before symptoms appear to be effective.

== Transmission ==
In male S. latifolia, M. violaceum eliminates pollen production in the anthers and replaces the pollen with fungal teliospores. These teliospores can then be transferred by pollinators to other plants, resulting in the spread of the infection. In females, the infection can subdue the development of the reproductive organs, styles and ovaries, resulting in complete sterilization.

== Risk of infection ==
Male S. latifolia tend to have a lower rate of infection compared to female S. latifolia because males have the ability to drop contaminated flowers before the entire plant is infected by M. violaceum; whereas, females do not have that male phenotype. So females hold onto the flowers with the intention to develop fruits carrying seeds with the purpose of creating offspring. However, these "offspring" merely carry the fungal disease and cannot develop into mature plants.

== Effect of sterilizing diseases ==
Sterilizing diseases do not attract a lot of attention in the research field compared to diseases that cause mortality in humans. However, there is an abundance of these diseases across biological kingdoms (i.e. plants, animals, fungi). They can create detrimental effects on a species' population size because, although the organism does not immediately die, it cannot reproduce for the next generation. This chain of reaction leads to a decreased population size, which in extreme situations could lead to extinction. In addition, hosts with long life-spans can act as a "disease reservoir" in transmission by being a constant source for spreading the disease for years.

== Related examples ==
=== Gypsophila repens ===
G. repens is a hermaphroditic plant species that is also plagued by M. violaceum, but it is usually only partially diseased. The same branch can have healthy and diseased flowers, and some of the diseased flowers can still have functional stigmas and produce seeds; whereas, the stigmas in diseased flowers of most host species are usually greatly reduced in their function or aborted, leading to sterility. A study conducted by López-Villavicencio et al. (2005) drew the conclusion that M. violaceum had recently undergone a host shift to G. repens from another diseased Caryophyllaceae species because of the disease's failure to completely infect and sterilize G. repens.

=== Spodoptera frugiperda ===
S. frugiperda, the fall armyworm, is affected by the ectoparasitic nematode Noctuidonema guyanense, which can usually be found on the "intersegmental membranes of the abdomen of both sexes of its adult hosts," and is transmitted through mating, but not found on the host's larvae. N. guyanese can shorten the lifespan or reduce flight ability and fecundity in its adult host, thus acting as a sexually transmitted parasitic infection.

=== Homo sapiens ===
Chlamydia trachomatis is the M. violaceum of humans, except it is a bacterial sexually transmitted infection rather than fungal. It is primarily transmitted through sexual intercourse, but can also be vertically transmitted from mother to child during birth. The latter form of transmission leaves the child with chlamydial conjunctivitis and pneumonia. Due to this complication, along with female infertility, the main focus of research and screening strategies for chlamydia is women. However, there is emerging research that shows that men also experience reduced fertility because of "decreased semen quality and impaired sperm fertilizing capacity and DNA integrity".

== See also ==
- Sex determination in Silene
