= Yunnan Agricultural University =

University in Kunming, China

Coordinates: 25.129°N 102.742°E

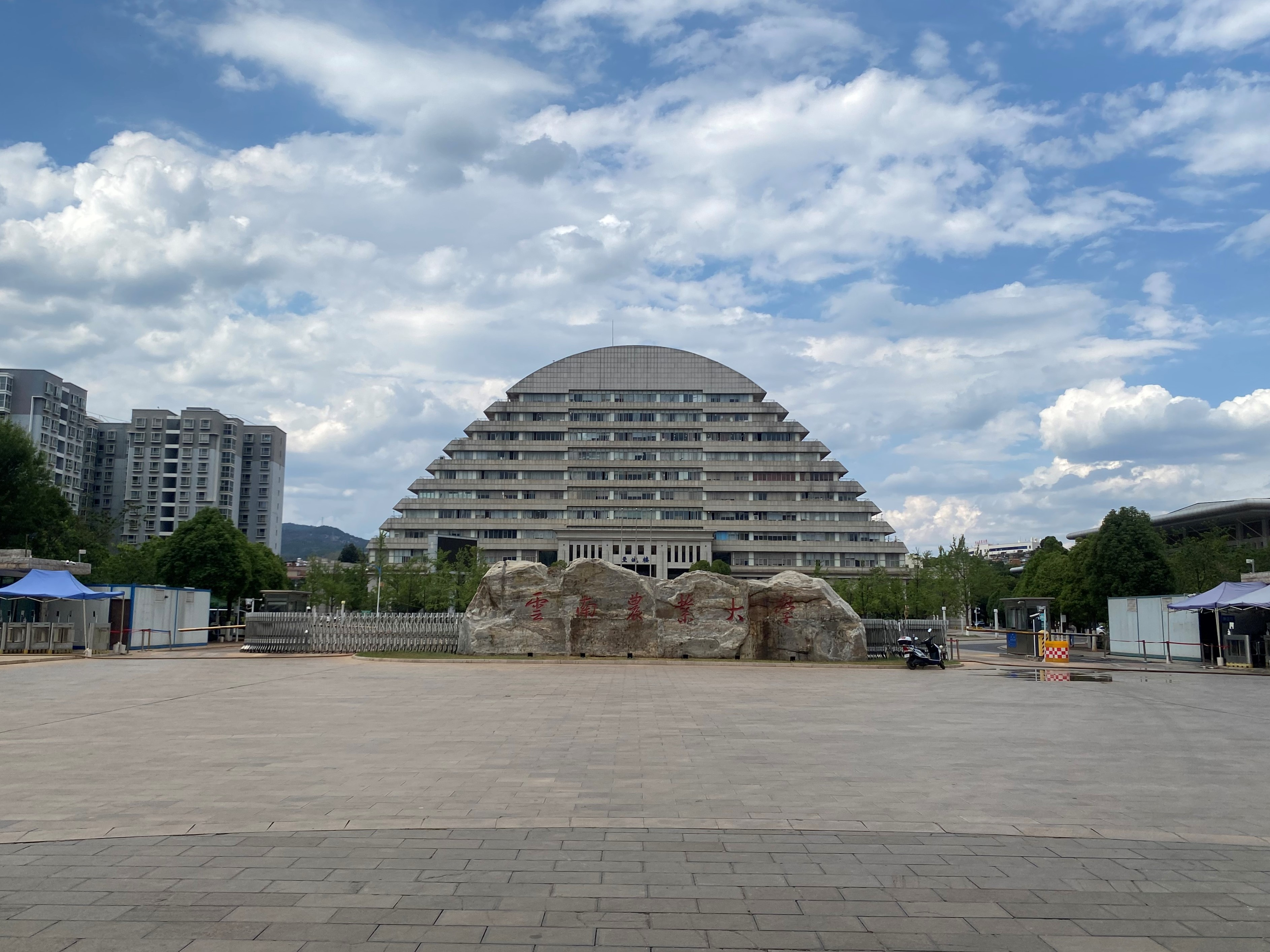
Main entrance of the Heilongtan west campus of Yunnan Agricultural University

Yunnan Agricultural University (Chinese: 云南农业大学) is in Kunming, Yunnan, China.

== History ==
It was initially established in Kunming in 1938 (88 years ago) as the 'School of Agricultural' at Yunnan University. Separated from Yunnan University in 1958, the School of Agriculture was renamed 'Kunming Agriculture and Forestry College' (KAFC). The formal title, Yunnan Agricultural University, was adopted in 1971 because of the merger between KAFC and Yunnan Agriculture Working University (YAWU). It has been developed as a key university of Yunnan Province since 1993.

In 2001, YAU became one of the two biological science experts training bases in Yunnan Province. YAU is now a comprehensive university offering programs in agriculture, science, arts, engineering, education, and administration.

== Schools ==
Yunnan Agricultural University consists of 15 schools.

- School of Agriculture and Biotechnology
- School of Animal Science and Technology
- School of Economics and Trade
- School of Engineering
- School of Tobacco Science
- School of Plant Protection
- School of Ornamental and Horticulture
- School of Resources and Environment
- School of Water Resources, Hydraulics, and Architecture
- School of Science and Information
- School of Food Science and Technology
- School of Physical Education
- School of Foreign Languages
- School of Humanities and Social Science
- School of Continuing Education

== Programs ==
As of January 2025, the university offers 74 undergraduate programs, including 6 national-level characteristic programs, 13 national-level first-class programs, and 2 programs accredited by the China Engineering Education Accreditation. Additionally, it features 7 provincial-level characteristic programs, 8 provincial-level key development programs, 5 provincial-level brand programs, 24 provincial-level first-class programs, and 3 Sino-foreign cooperative education programs. It boasts 8 provincial-level first-class disciplines, 7 first-level doctoral programs, and 27 second-level doctoral programs; 17 first-level master's programs and 71 second-level master's programs.

== Campus ==
The university campus, covering an area of 130 hectares, is in Heilongtan Park (Black Dragon Pool Park), one of the scenic spots to the north of Kunming. The area of the campus building is about 250,000 square meters. YAU provides facilities for teaching and research projects.

The university library has 630,000 volumes and many other journals. The campus has been networked to improve its teaching and working effectiveness and efficiency. In 1998, YAU was awarded as a Civilized University by Yunnan Provincial Government.

== Staff ==
There are 1,198 faculty and staff members at YAU, of whom 51 are professors and 162 are associate professors. 113 faculty members are master's degree advisors, and 6 professors are appointed as the doctoral degree advisors by other universities. 11 outstanding faculty members have been selected as the major academic leaders in the New Century Science and Technology Projects in Yunnan Province. 10 faculty members have been awarded the outstanding science experts by Yunnan Province. 21 teachers have been honored as outstanding teachers in the province.

== Students ==
As of January 2025, the university has over 32,000 full-time students, more than 17,000 students enrolled in higher education continuing education programs, and 393 international students.

== Notable people ==
- Li Zhengyou, professor, the "father of high-altitude hybrid rice".
