= Hybrid seed =

Seeds produced by cross-pollinated plants

In agriculture and gardening, hybrid seed is produced by deliberately cross-pollinating parent plants which are genetically distinct. The parents are usually two inbred strains.

Hybrid seed is common in industrial agriculture and home gardening. It is one of the main contributors to the dramatic rise in agricultural output during the last half of the 20th century. Alternatives to hybridization include open pollination and clonal propagation.

An important factor is the heterosis that results from the genetic differences between the parents, which can produce higher yield and faster growth rate. Crossing any particular pair of inbred strains may or may not result in superior offspring. The parent strains used are carefully chosen so as to achieve the uniformity that comes from the uniformity of the parents, and the superior performance that comes from heterosis.

Elite inbred strains are used that express well-documented and consistent phenotypes with yield that is relatively good for inbred plants. Other characteristics of the parents are carefully chosen to provide desirable traits such as improved color, flavour, or disease resistance.

Hybrid seeds planted by the farmer produce similar plants, but the seeds of the next generation from those hybrids will not consistently have the desired characteristics because of genetic assortment. It is therefore rarely desirable to save the seeds from hybrid plants to start the next crop.

== History ==
In the US, experimental agriculture stations in the 1920s investigated the hybrid crops, and by the 1930s farmers had widely adopted the first hybrid maize.

== See also ==
- F1 hybrid
- Hybrid (biology)
- Plant breeding
- Seed saving
- Male sterility in plants
