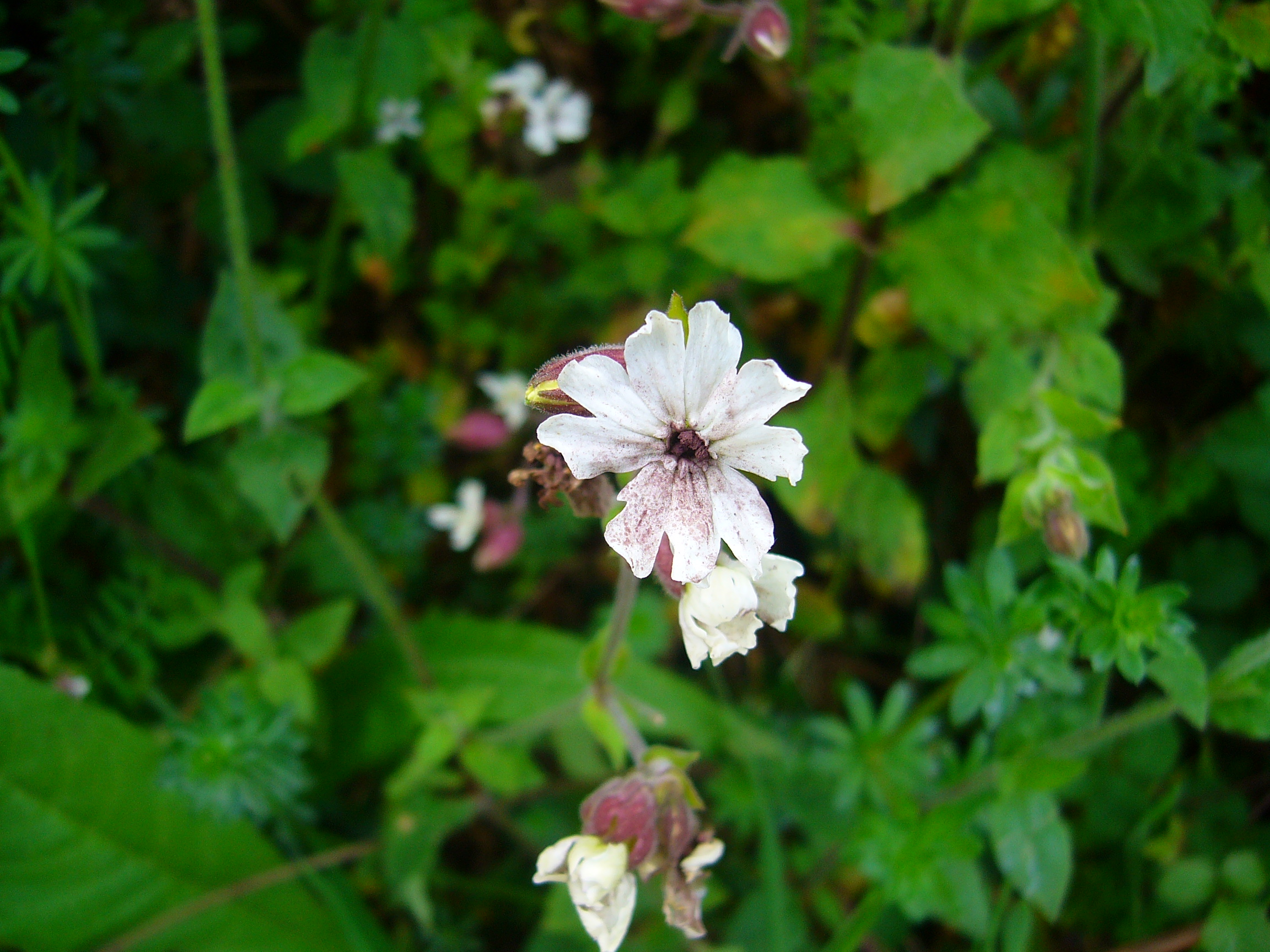
- Microbotryum violaceum on Silene alba

Scientific classification
- Kingdom: Fungi
- Division: Basidiomycota
- Class: Microbotryomycetes
- Order: Microbotryales
- Family: Microbotryaceae
- Genus: Microbotryum
- Species: M. violaceum

Binomial name
- Microbotryum violaceum (Pers.) G. Deml & Oberw., (1982)

Synonyms
- Caeoma antherarum (DC.) Nees (1816); Caeoma violaceum (DC.) Nees (1816); Microbotryum antherarum (DC.) Lév., (1847); Uredo antherarum DC., (1815); Uredo antherarum var. antherarum DC., (1815); Uredo antherarum a silenes-nutantis DC., (1815); Uredo violacea Pers., (1797); Ustilago antherarum (DC.) Fr., (1832); Ustilago silenes-nutantis (DC.) Liro, (1924); Ustilago violacea (Pers.) Roussel, (1806) Ustilago violacea var. silenes-nutantis (DC.) Durrieu & Zambett., (1973)

= Microbotryum violaceum =

Species of fungus

Microbotryum violaceum, also known as the anther smut fungus, was formerly known as Ustilago violacea. It is a basidiomycete obligate parasite of many Caryophyllaceae. But it has now separated into many species due to its host specificity.

Meiosis in M. violaceum produces a tetrad of four haploid meiotic products. Pairwise intra-tetrad mating can occur between these meiotic products.

== Examples ==
Microbotryum violaceum can infect and sterilize the plant species Silene latifolia by acting like a sexually transmitted infection.
