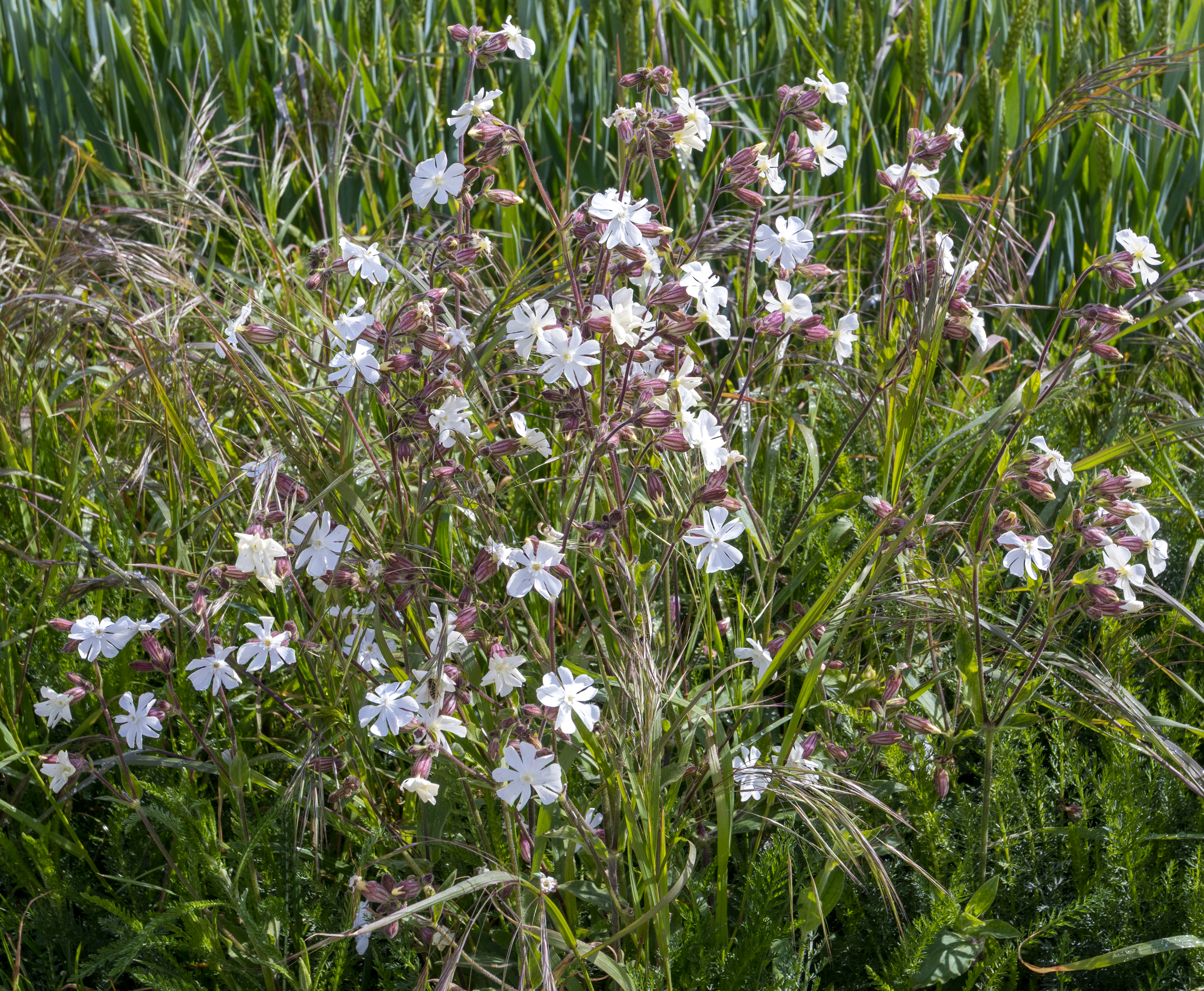

Scientific classification
- Kingdom: Plantae
- Clade: Embryophytes
- Clade: Tracheophytes
- Clade: Spermatophytes
- Clade: Angiosperms
- Clade: Eudicots
- Order: Caryophyllales
- Family: Caryophyllaceae
- Genus: Silene
- Species: S. latifolia

Binomial name
- Silene latifolia Poir.

Synonyms
- Lychnis alba Mill.; Melandrium album (Mill.) Garcke; Melandrium dioicum subsp. album (Mill.) D.Löve; Silene alba (Mill.) E.H.L.Krause non Muhl. ex Rohrb.; Lychnis pratensis Rafn; Silene pratensis (Rafn) Godr.; Lychnis vespertina Sibth.; Melandrium vespertinum (Sibth.) Fr.

= Silene latifolia =

Species of flowering plant

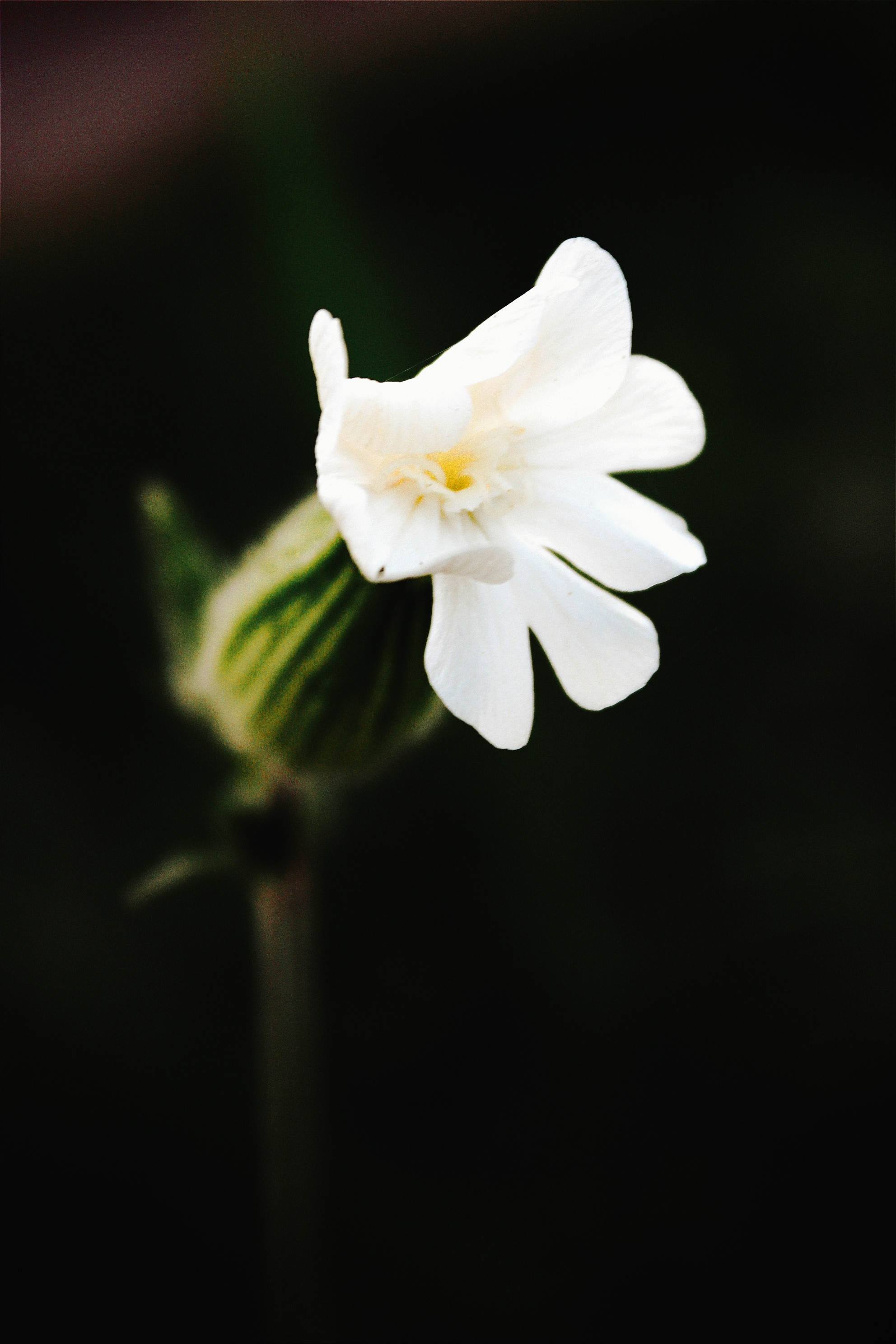
Silene latifolia

Silene latifolia, commonly known as white campion, is a dioecious flowering plant in the family Caryophyllaceae, native to most of Europe, Western Asia and northern Africa. It is a herbaceous annual, occasionally biennial or a short-lived perennial plant, growing to between 40–80 centimetres tall. It is also known in the US as bladder campion but should not be confused with Silene vulgaris, which is more generally called bladder campion.

The appearance depends on the age of the plant; when young they form a basal rosette of oval to lanceolate leaves 4–10 cm long, and when they get older, forked stems grow from these, with leaves in opposite pairs. The flowers grow in clusters at the tops of the stems, 2.5–3 cm diameter, with a distinctive inflated calyx and five white petals, each petal deeply notched; flowering lasts from late spring to early autumn. The entire plant is densely hairy. Occasional plants with pink flowers are usually hybrids with red campion (Silene dioica).

== Habitat and occurrence ==
White campion grows in most open habitats, particularly wasteland and fields, most commonly on neutral to alkaline soils. Despite the wide array of conditions in which campion can thrive, it prefers sunny areas that have rich and well-drained soil. An example ecoregion of occurrence is in the Sarmatic mixed forests.

It is also named the Grave Flower or Flower of the Dead in parts of England as they are seen often growing on gravesites and around tombstones.

It is naturalised in North America, being found in most of the United States, the greatest concentrations of the plant can be found in the north-central and northeastern sections of the country. S. latifolia is thought to have arrived in North America as a component of ship ballast.

== Inbreeding avoidance ==
In S. latifolia, outbred male offspring were found to sire significantly more progeny than inbred male offspring. This study indicated the occurrence of inbreeding depression in male plants under natural conditions. In female plants, inbreeding depression significantly affects vegetative growth, age at first flowering and total fitness.

Post-pollination selection occurs in S. latifolia. After multiple-donor pollination, it was found that pollen or embryo selection likely reduces the occurrence of inbred progeny.

== Sex Chromosomes ==
S. latifolia is a dioecious plant, which means that they have male and female individuals. The sex of S. latifolia is determined by sex chromosomes. XX individuals are female, XY individuals are male. The Y chromosome is larger than the X chromosome, and the sex chromosomes are the largest chromosome in S. latifolia.

Sex chromosomes of S. latifolia originated from a pair of autosomes that evolved sex determining genes and stopped recombining. Recombination suppression between X and Y chromosome in S. latifolia has been found and degeneration of the Y chromosome has started. Sex-linked gene mapping shows three evolutionary strata where recombination stopped through three different major events.

Recombination of the central region of the X chromosome has also been found to be suppressed. Incomplete dosage compensation is found in the X chromosome.

== Medicinal uses ==
The Ojibwe people have traditionally used a root infusion of this plant as a cathartic, as documented in Huron H. Smith's 1932 ethnobotanical study of the Ojibwe Indians. Historical European folk medicine additionally attributed sedative properties to the plant, with infusions reportedly used for insomnia and anxiety, and leaf poultices applied to skin irritations and wounds.

S. latifolia belongs to a genus with a well-documented range of pharmacological properties. Phytochemical investigations of the Silene genus have identified a wide range of secondary metabolites in member species, including phytoecdysteroids, triterpenoid saponins, terpenoids, flavonoids, anthocyanidins, and sterols. Across the genus, biological activities demonstrated in laboratory studies include antimicrobial, antifungal, antiviral, antioxidant, antitumour, immunomodulatory, adaptogenic, and hepatoprotective effects.

The first direct pharmacological study of S. latifolia itself was published in 2026 by Gökkaya et al., who assessed the antibacterial, antioxidant, and cytotoxic properties of extracts from the aerial parts of the plant. The methanol extract showed notable activity against the MCF-7 breast cancer cell line (IC_{50}: 19.25 µg/mL after 24 hours), while the water sub-extract showed activity against the MDA-MB-231 breast cancer cell line (IC_{50}: 15.20 µg/mL). These are preliminary in vitro findings, and further research is required.

== Susceptibility to disease ==
Silene latifolia is afflicted by the fungal pathogen Microbotryum violaceum, which acts as a sterilizing sexually transmitted infection in this species.

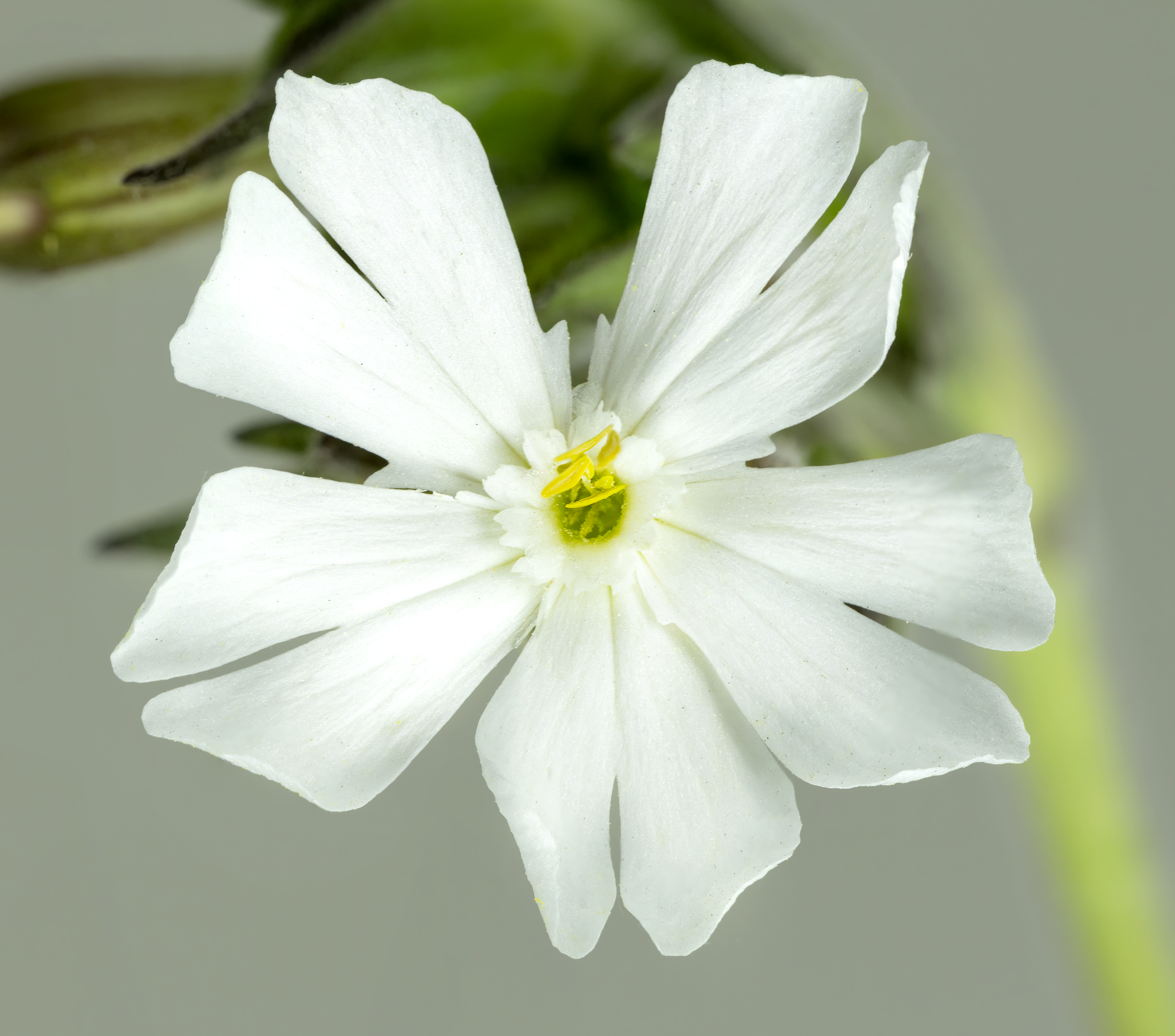
Each petal is deeply notched

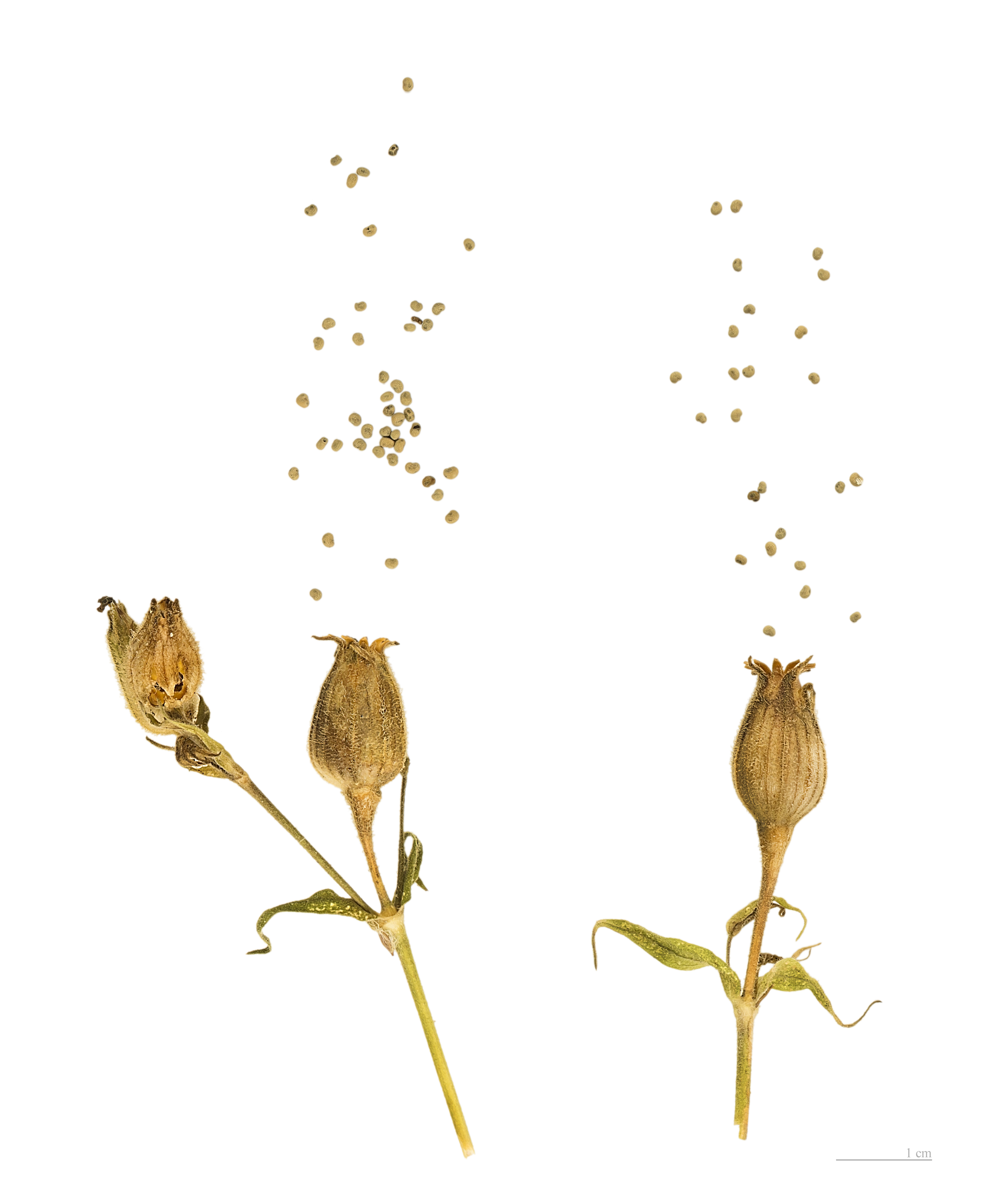
Silene latifolia – MHNT

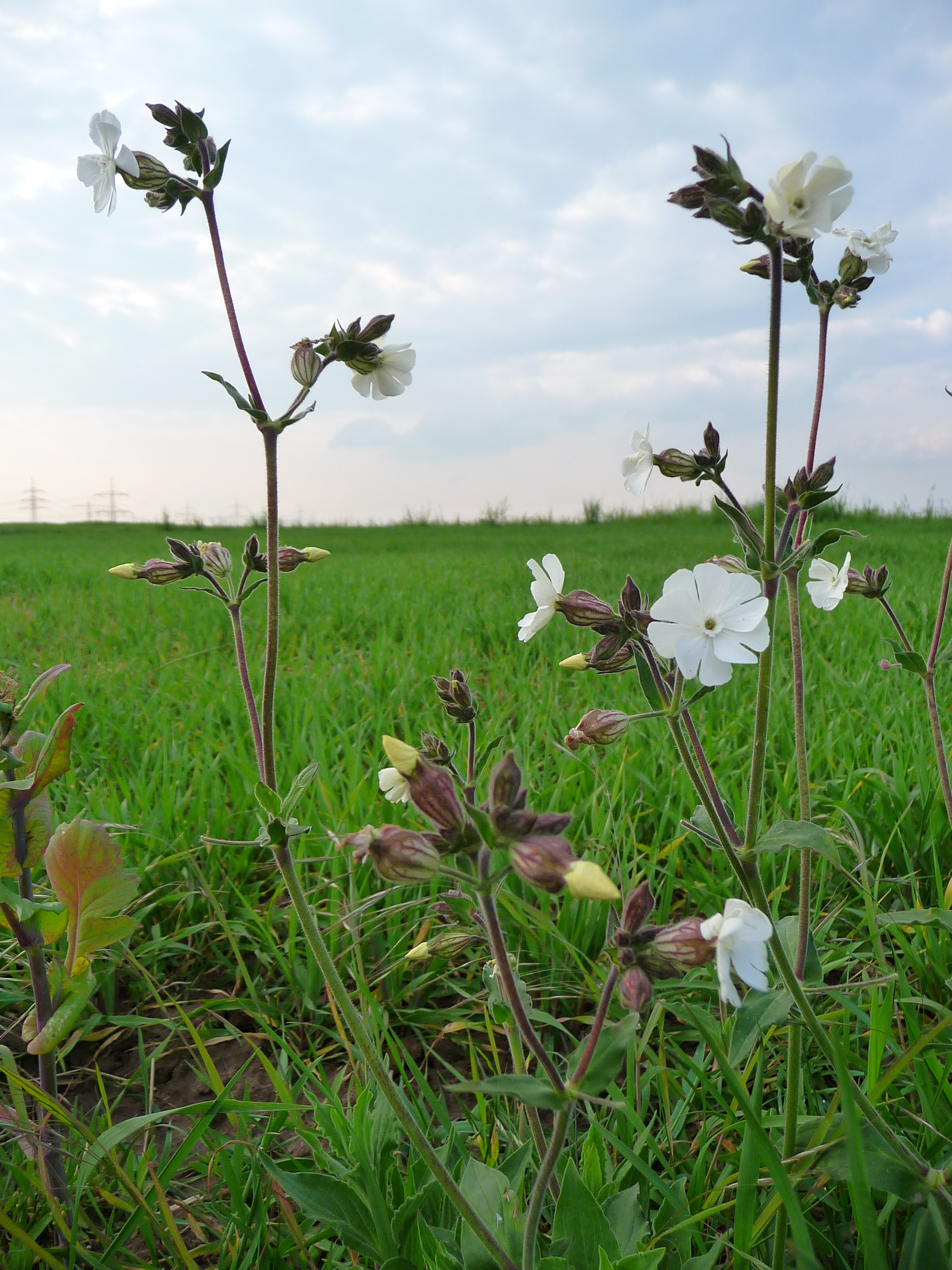
Silene latifolia in an open area that has a lot of exposure to sunlight
