= Male sterility in plants =

Sterile male plants are plants that fail to produce functional pollen resulting in the inability to self-fertilize or contribute pollen for fertilization. Male sterility can arise from genetic mutations in either the nuclear or cytoplasmic genomes, developmental defects in anther or pollen formation, or environmental factors. Naturally occurring male sterility systems, as well as engineered approaches, are widely used in plant breeding to facilitate the production of hybrid seed. Pollen development is highly sensitive to environmental conditions, with heat stress posing a significant and increasing challenge in crop production. High day or night temperatures can trigger male sterility, resulting in reduced seed or fruit set and yield. Even a short episode of elevated temperature can disrupt anther development, often by causing premature degeneration of the tapetum or impairing its ability to nourish developing pollen.

In cytoplasmic male sterility (CMS), defects in mitochondrial gene expression disrupt normal anther and pollen development, often through impaired function of the tapetum, a nutritive tissue required for pollen maturation. CMS systems are widespread in flowering plants and have been extensively exploited in crop breeding to facilitate hybrid seed production. In some engineered systems, targeted genetic approaches have been used to selectively disrupt tapetal function to induce male sterility. The mutations cause the breakdown of the mitochondria in these specific cells and result in cell death and so pollen production is interrupted.

== Types of male sterility ==
Male sterility in plants can be broadly classified based on its genetic basis and the mechanisms by which sterility is expressed. Major categories include cytoplasmic male sterility, genic (nuclear) male sterility, and environmentally sensitive male sterility systems.

=== Cytoplasmic male sterility ===
Cytoplasmic male sterility (CMS) is widely used in the production of hybrid seed in crops which exhibit strong hybrid vigor. CMS systems are maternally inherited and result from specific interactions between mitochondrial genes associated with sterility and a nuclear genome that lacks fertility restorer (Rf) genes, leading to disrupted pollen development. In crop species where seed production is the primary economic trait, such as maize and oilseed Brassica species, nuclear Rf genes are required to restore fertility in hybrid progeny. Although CMS has been extensively characterized and applied in plant breeding, the evolutionary origins of CMS-associated mitochondrial genes and the detailed molecular mechanisms underlying CMS across different plant species remain incompletely understood.

=== Genic male sterility ===
Genic male sterility (GMS) is caused by mutations in nuclear genes required for normal anther or pollen development and follows Mendelian inheritance. Such mutations can disrupt diverse developmental processes, including meiosis, tapetum differentiation, pollen wall formation, and pollen maturation. Genic male sterility occurs naturally in many plant species and can also be generated through induced mutagenesis or targeted genome editing.

A subset of genic male sterility systems is environmentally sensitive, with fertility controlled by factors such as temperature or photoperiod. These environmentally sensitive genic male sterility (EGMS) systems are widely used in two-line hybrid breeding, particularly in rice, where male sterility and fertility can be reversibly controlled by environmental conditions. Compared with cytoplasmic male sterility systems, two-line systems do not require fertility restorer genes, which can simplify hybrid seed production under controlled conditions. Environmentally sensitive male sterility has been described in multiple crop species and is exploited in hybrid seed production by manipulating growing conditions to alternate between fertile and sterile phases during line maintenance and hybridization.

== Applications in plant breeding ==
Male sterility is widely used in plant breeding to facilitate the production of hybrid seed, due to the agricultural benefits of heterosis. By preventing self-pollination, male-sterile lines enable controlled cross-pollination without the need for manual emasculation. Both naturally occurring and engineered male sterility systems are employed in a range of crop species to improve breeding efficiency and hybrid seed production.

== See also ==
- Tapetum (botany)
- Plant reproduction
