= Parafomoria halimivora =

Scientific classification
- Kingdom: Animalia
- Phylum: Arthropoda
- Clade: Pancrustacea
- Class: Insecta
- Order: Lepidoptera
- Family: Nepticulidae
- Genus: Parafomoria
- Species: P. halimivora

Binomial name
- Parafomoria halimivora van Nieukerken, 1985

Species of moth

Parafomoria halimivora is a moth of the family Nepticulidae. It is found in the Iberian Peninsula.

The length of the forewings is 2.1-2.3 mm for males and 1.8-2.2 mm for females. Adults are on wing in April, May and September. There are probably several generations per year.

The larvae feed on Halimium alyssoides, Halimium atriplicifolium, Halimium halimifolium and Halimium ocymoides. They mine the leaves of their host plant.
