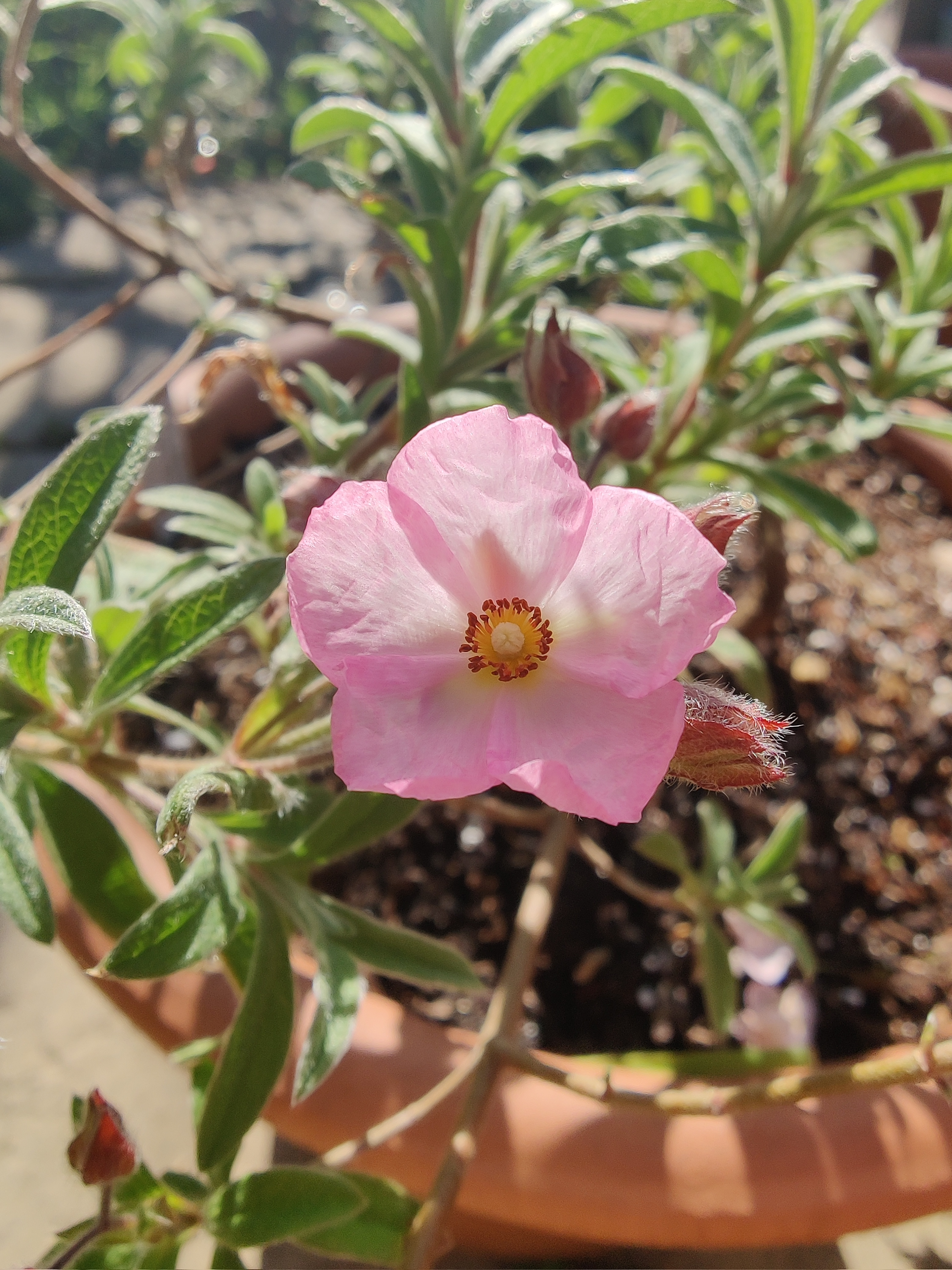

Scientific classification
- Kingdom: Plantae
- Clade: Tracheophytes
- Clade: Angiosperms
- Clade: Eudicots
- Clade: Rosids
- Order: Malvales
- Family: Cistaceae
- Genus: Cistus
- Species: C. × skanbergii

Binomial name
- Cistus × skanbergii Lojac.

= Cistus × skanbergii =

Hybrid flowering plant

Cistus × skanbergii is a compact, bushy variety of rockrose, with pale pink flowers and grey-green foliage. It is also known by the common name dwarf pink rockrose.

== Taxonomy ==
It was first described as a species by Italian botanist Michele Lojacono Pojero, who dedicated it "to Mr. A. Skanberg of Stockholm, an excellent botanist and most beloved friend".

It is a natural hybrid between Cistus monspeliensis and Cistus parviflorus which originates where the two species overlap in Greece and Sicily.

== Description ==
It is a low, dense subshrub that is 2 to 3 or 4 feet tall by 4-5 or 6 feet wide with soft, grey-green leaves. From spring to early summer, the 1 inch wide, pale pink flowers are borne with yellow stamens in the center.
