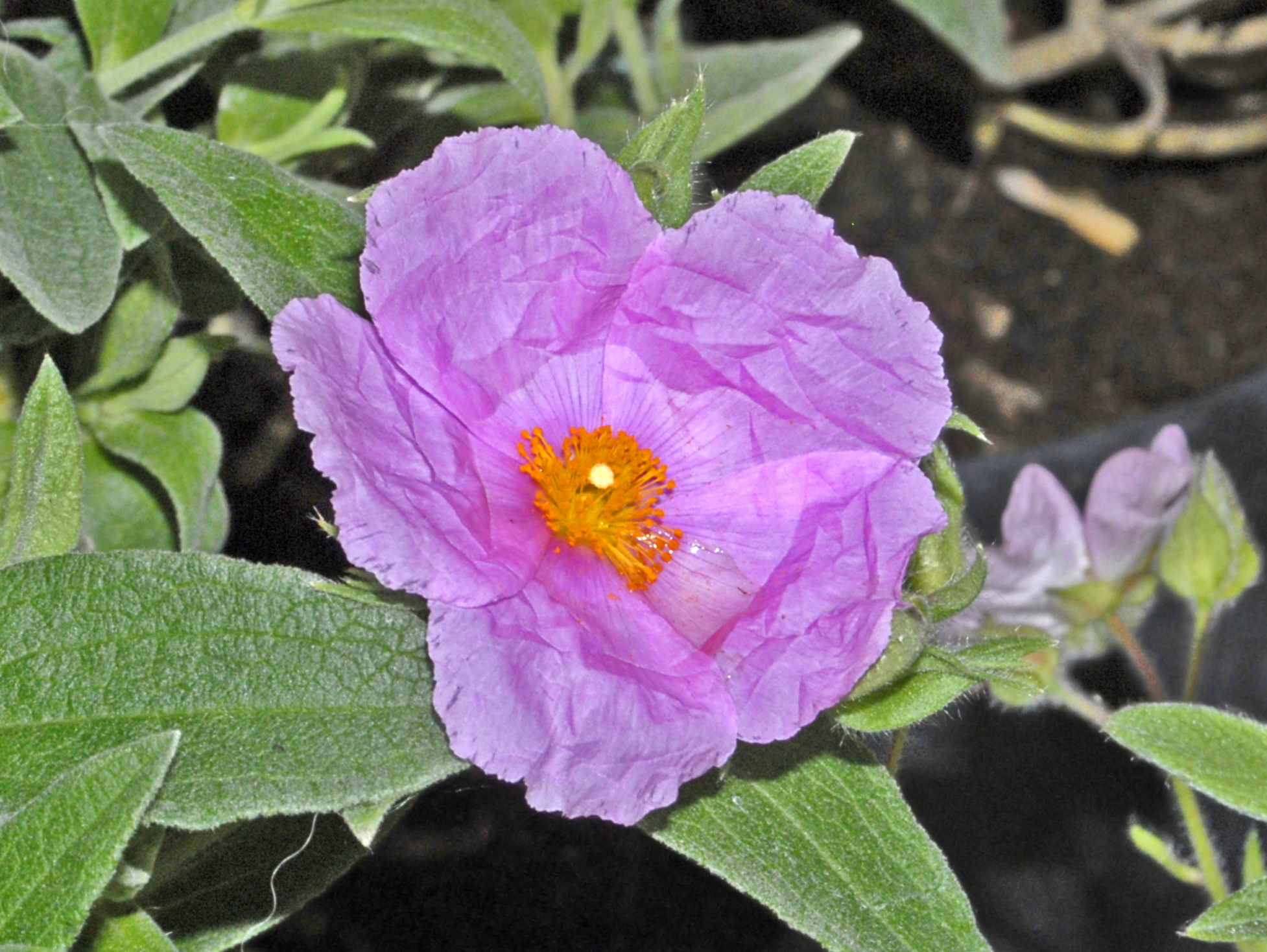
- Cistus × rodiaei Jessica

Scientific classification
- Kingdom: Plantae
- Clade: Tracheophytes
- Clade: Angiosperms
- Clade: Eudicots
- Clade: Rosids
- Order: Malvales
- Family: Cistaceae
- Genus: Cistus
- Species: C. × rodiaei

Binomial name
- Cistus × rodiaei Verg.

= Cistus × rodiaei =

Hybrid flowering plant

Cistus × rodiaei is a variety of rockrose. It is a hybrid between Cistus ladanifer and Cistus albidus.

It is a small gray-green evergreen shrub reaching a maximum height of 70 centimetres (28 in). These rockroses have huge deep pink flowers with a diameter of 8–10 centimetres (3.1–3.9 in). They bloom from late April to early June.
