= Cistus chinamadensis =

Conservation status
- Endangered (IUCN 3.1)

Scientific classification
- Kingdom: Plantae
- Clade: Embryophytes
- Clade: Tracheophytes
- Clade: Spermatophytes
- Clade: Angiosperms
- Clade: Eudicots
- Clade: Rosids
- Order: Malvales
- Family: Cistaceae
- Genus: Cistus
- Species: C. chinamadensis

Binomial name
- Cistus chinamadensis Bañares & P.Romero

Species of flowering plant

Cistus chinamadensis is a shrubby species of flowering plant in the family Cistaceae, with purple-pink flowers, first described in 1991. It is endemic to the Canary Islands, where three subspecies occur on three separate islands (Tenerife, La Gomera and El Hierro). The species has been assessed as endangered in the IUCN Red List, being known only from small separated areas and facing a variety of threats.

== Description ==
Cistus chinamadensis is a shrub, usually 25–70 cm (10 in – 2 ft 4 in) tall. The woody stems have dark brown bark that easily frays and strips off. The upper branches have a dense velvety covering of fine hairs (indumentum), beige to off-white in colour. The oppositely arranged leaves are light green (in subsp. gomerae) or greyish green (in subsp. chinamadensis), around 4.5–8.5 cm (1.8–3.3 in) long by 2.3–3 cm (0.9–1.2 in) wide, with a pointed tip. The leaves have three prominent veins. Opposite pairs of leaves are joined at the base by a 1 cm (0.4 in) long sheath, the outside of which is furrowed and the inside covered in hairs (as is the outside in subsp. gomerae). The upper sides of the leaves are more-or-less smooth, the lower sides rough and reticulate, to a varying degree between the subspecies.

The flowers are arranged in open, slightly branched cymes, with 4–8 flowers to each inflorescence. The sepals have a short tooth, up to 3 mm (0.1 in) long, at the apex and are of two distinct sizes. Two outer sepals are around 7–9 mm (0.3–0.4 in) long by 3–4 mm (0.1–0.2 in) wide; three inner sepals are considerably larger, around 12–15 mm (0.5–0.6 in) long by 9–12 mm (0.4–0.5 in) wide. The petals are pink with yellowish bases, more-or-less rounded, about 2.5 cm (1.0 in) long and wide. The yellow stamens are somewhat shorter than the sepals. The ovary is 4–5 mm (0.2–0.2 in) high, topped by a style about 9–12 mm (0.4–0.5 in) long. In its native habitat, C. chinamadenis flowers in May and produces seeds in June to July.

== Taxonomy and phylogeny ==
Cistus chinamadensis was first described in 1991 by Ángel Bañares Baudet and Pedro Romero Manrique. The species was first found at Roque de los Pinos near to the village of Chinamada in the Anaga region of Tenerife; hence the specific epithet chinamadensis meaning "from Chinamada". Two subspecies were initially described, C. chinamadensis subsp. chinamadensis and C. ch. subsp. gomerae. In 2005 a further subspecies, C. ch. subsp. ombriosus, was described by Jean-Pierre Demoly and M. Marrero.

A 2011 molecular phylogenetic study placed C. chinamadensis as a member of the purple and pink flowered clade of Cistus species, along with some other Canary Island endemics (Cistus asper, Cistus horrens, Cistus ocreatus, and Cistus symphytifolius), although the three subspecies did not form a clade, with some analyses separating C. ch. subsp. ombriosus in particular from the other two subspecies.

Species-level cladogram of Cistus species.

- - Halimium spp.
  - - Halimium spp.
    - - PPC
        - Cistus crispus
        - - - Cistus heterophyllus
            - - Cistus albidus
              - Cistus creticus
          - - Cistus asper
            - Cistus chinamadensis
            - Cistus horrens
            - Cistus ocreatus
            - Cistus osbeckiifolius
            - Cistus palmensis
            - Cistus symphytifolius
  - WWPC
    - - Cistus clusii
      - Cistus munbyi
    - - Cistus inflatus
      - Cistus ladanifer
      - Cistus laurifolius
      - Cistus libanotis
      - Cistus monspeliensis
      - Cistus parviflorus
      - Cistus populifolius
      - Cistus pouzolzii
      - Cistus salviifolius
      - Cistus sintenisii

Species-level cladogram of Cistus species, based on plastid and nuclear DNA sequences

== Distribution and habitat ==
Cistus chinamadensis is endemic to the Canary Islands. The three subspecies are found on different islands: C. ch. subsp. chinamadensis in the north of Tenerife in three locations in the Anaga region at altitudes of around 400–700 m (1,300–2,300 ft); C. ch. subsp. gomerae in one natural location and several introduced locations in La Gomera at around 1,000–1,300 m (3,300–4,300 ft); and C. ch. subsp. ombriosus in one location in El Hierro at 1,250 m (4,100 ft).

== Conservation ==
In 2011 when its status was assessed as "endangered" according to the IUCN Red List criteria, Cistus chinamadensis was known from seven locations in the Canary Islands. C. ch. ssp. chinamadensis from Tenerife was present in three locations; its population appeared to be stable or increasing. C. ch. ssp. gomerae from La Gomera was found in two natural locations and has since been introduced to four others. Its range appeared to be decreasing. C. ch. subsp. ombriosus from El Hierro was present in a single location with an area of about 1 km^{2} (0.4 mi^{2}). Threats to the species include a variety of natural hazards, such as landslides, fires and drought, and biological hazards, such as grazing.
