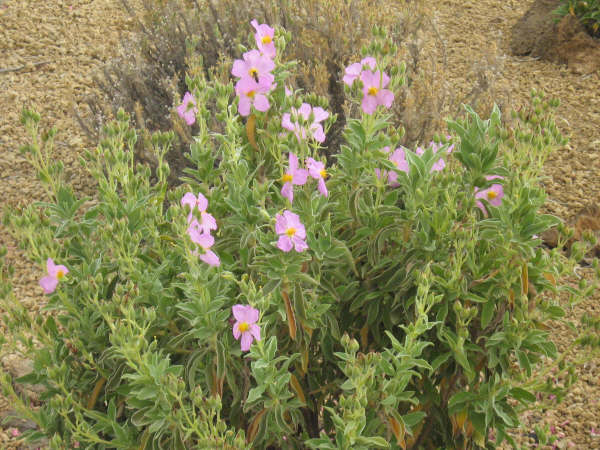

Scientific classification
- Kingdom: Plantae
- Clade: Embryophytes
- Clade: Tracheophytes
- Clade: Spermatophytes
- Clade: Angiosperms
- Clade: Eudicots
- Clade: Rosids
- Order: Malvales
- Family: Cistaceae
- Genus: Cistus
- Species: C. osbeckiifolius

Binomial name
- Cistus osbeckiifolius Webb

= Cistus osbeckiifolius =

Species of flowering plant

Cistus osbeckiifolius is a shrubby species of flowering plant in the family Cistaceae, with pink to purple flowers.

== Description ==
Cistus osbeckiifolius is a shrub usually up to 1.2 m (4 ft) tall, although it may reach 1.55 m (5 ft). Its three-nerved leaves are narrow, lanceolate to elliptical in shape, and slightly pointed at the apex. They are densely covered with simple hairs. The flowers are about 5 cm (2.0 in) across, with pink to purple petals. The stigma is longer than the stamens. The fruiting capsules are brown and covered with hairs.

== Taxonomy and phylogeny ==
Cistus osbeckiifolius was formally named in 1887 (the epithet was originally spelt osbeckiaefolius). Philip Webb collected in the Canary Islands in 1828–1830. Although he gave this species a name and wrote a description, it was not published in his lifetime (he died in 1854). In 1887, Heinrich Christ published Webb's description, along with those of other plants in Webb's herbarium. The epithet osbeckiifolius means "with leaves like Osbeckia".

A subspecies, C. osbeckiifolius subsp. tomentosus Bañares & Demoly, has been recognized (hence creating the nominate subspecies, C. osbeckiifolius subsp. osbeckiifolius), although as of March 2015 The Plant List does not accept this taxon.

A 2011 molecular phylogenetic study placed C. osbeckiifolius as a member of the purple and pink flowered clade (PPC) of Cistus species, along with other Canary Island endemics.

Species-level cladogram of Cistus species

- - Halimium spp.
  - - Halimium spp.
    - - PPC
        - Cistus crispus
        - - - Cistus heterophyllus
            - - Cistus albidus
              - Cistus creticus
          - - Cistus asper
            - Cistus chinamadensis
            - Cistus horrens
            - Cistus ocreatus
            - Cistus osbeckiifolius
            - Cistus palmensis
            - Cistus symphytifolius
  - WWPC
    - - Cistus clusii
      - Cistus munbyi
    - - Cistus inflatus
      - Cistus ladanifer
      - Cistus laurifolius
      - Cistus libanotis
      - Cistus monspeliensis
      - Cistus parviflorus
      - Cistus populifolius
      - Cistus pouzolzii
      - Cistus salviifolius
      - Cistus sintenisii

Species-level cladogram of Cistus species, based on plastid and nuclear DNA sequences

== Distribution and habitat ==
Cistus osbeckiifolius is endemic to Tenerife in the Canary Islands. It is found at elevations of 1,400–2,400 m (4,600–7,900 ft) around Mount Teide, particularly in the region known as Las Cañadas. The climate is relatively dry and temperate to cold.

== Conservation ==
Cistus osbeckiifolius (as the subspecies osbeckiifolius) has been rated as "endangered" (EN) in the Spanish "Red List" (Libro Rojo de la Flora Vascular Amenazada de España). The species is considered at risk for several reasons: a limited area of distribution, restricted genetic diversity in all but one subpopulation, grazing by rabbits, the effects of fire, and human disturbance. In 2007 a fire destroyed one complete subpopulation.
