= Cistus grancanariae =

Scientific classification
- Kingdom: Plantae
- Clade: Tracheophytes
- Clade: Angiosperms
- Clade: Eudicots
- Clade: Rosids
- Order: Malvales
- Family: Cistaceae
- Genus: Cistus
- Species: C. grancanariae

Binomial name
- Cistus grancanariae Marrero Rodr., R.S.Almeida & C.Ríos

Species of flowering plant

Cistus grancanariae is a shrubby species of flowering plant in the family Cistaceae. It was described for the first time in 2008. It is endemic to a small area in the north of the island of Gran Canaria.

== Description ==
Cistus grancanariae is a shrub, usually 60–120 cm (2–4 ft) high, densely branched, with grey-green leaves clustered towards the end of the branches. The oppositely arranged leaves are around 1.5–4 cm (0.6–1.6 in) long by 5–18 mm (0.2–0.7 in) wide, with three (or occasionally up to five) very obvious main veins. The upper sides of the leaves are covered with short stellate (star-shaped) hairs and long simple hairs, some glandular. The undersides of the leaves are whitish and more densely covered with hairs. The flowers are arranged in cymes, with 3–25 flowers to each inflorescence. Individual flowers are 18–28 mm (0.7–1.1 in) across. The petals are white, more-or-less rounded, about 8–14 mm (0.3–0.6 in) long and wide, with a wavy truncated apex and a short narrowed pale yellow tinged base. There are 35-70 stamens, longer than the pistil, with filaments 2–4.5 cm (0.8–1.8 in) long. The style is very short, usually less than 0.6 mm (0.02 in) long. Fertilized flowers produce 7–20 blackish-brown seeds up to 1.7 mm (0.07 in) long.

== Taxonomy ==
Cistus grancanariae was first described in 2008 by Águedo Marrero, Rafael Almeida and Carlos Ríos. One of the group of white-flowered species of Cistus, it was previously mistaken for Cistus monspeliensis, common in Gran Canaria. The leaves of the two species are different: C. monspeliensis has narrower leaves, more rolled under at the edges (more revolute), with upper surfaces that are green, sticky (viscous), and without stellate hairs.

== Distribution and habitat ==
Cistus grancanariae is only found in a small region in the north of the island of Gran Canaria in the Canary Islands, at elevations of 100–750 m (330–2,460 ft), where it can form quite extensive stands. There are two main populations (Cabo Verde–Los Toscales and the Montaña de Guía) and three that are more fragmented. Plants are found in areas affected by human activity, such as deforestation, cultivation and grazing. The region is influenced by moist Atlantic winds, and has a Mediterranean-type climate, generally somewhat arid or with only seasonal rainfall, totalling 25–80 cm (10–31 in) a year.

== Conservation ==
Cistus grancanariae grows only in a limited area. Two of its locations are within protected areas, but these contain few individuals. Most of its range is unprotected and subject to human disturbance. In view of these factors, Marrero et al. consider that the species is eligible for vulnerable (VU) status under the IUCN Red List criteria.
