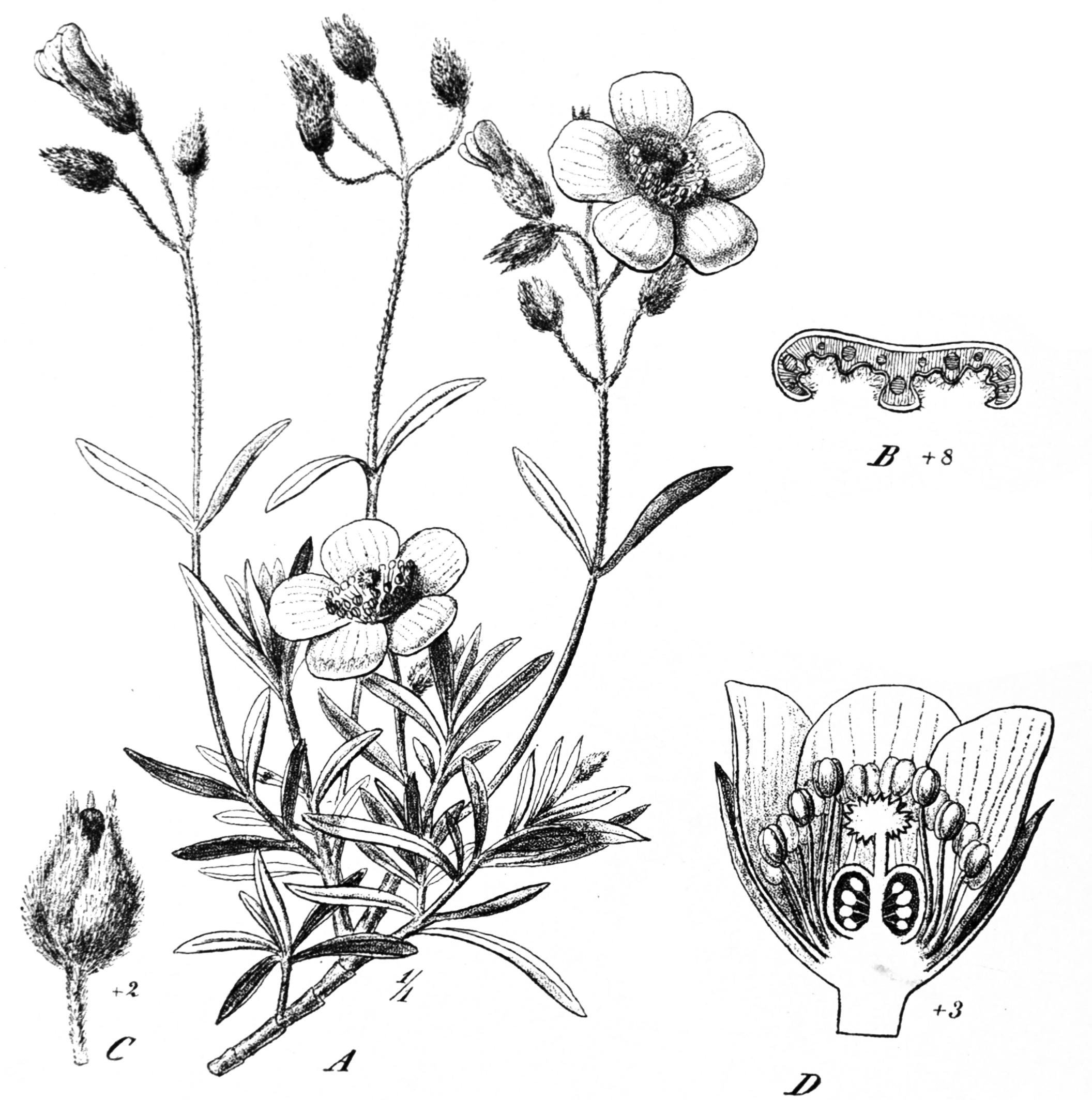

Scientific classification
- Kingdom: Plantae
- Clade: Embryophytes
- Clade: Tracheophytes
- Clade: Spermatophytes
- Clade: Angiosperms
- Clade: Eudicots
- Clade: Rosids
- Order: Malvales
- Family: Cistaceae
- Genus: Cistus
- Species: C. munbyi

Binomial name
- Cistus munbyi Pomel

Synonyms
- Cistus sericeus Munby, nom. illeg.

= Cistus munbyi =

Species of flowering plant

Cistus munbyi is a shrubby species of flowering plant in the family Cistaceae, with white flowers. Related to and resembling Cistus clusii, it is native to Morocco and Algeria in western north Africa.

== Description ==
Cistus munbyi has narrow linear leaves with a single prominent vein, generally 6–30 mm (0.2–1.2 in) long by 1–4 mm (0.0–0.2 in) wide, with edges that are turned down (revolute). The upper surfaces of the leaves are smooth, the lower surfaces have a dense covering of short stellate hairs. It has white flowers. C. munbyi resembles C. clusii, but the flower-bearing branches are longer and the flower stalks (peduncles) and sepals are covered with white hairs, making them appear silky ("sericeus").

== Taxonomy ==
Giles Munby gave a description of this species under the name Cistus sericeus in 1847. The name had already been published by Martin Vahl in 1790, so that Munby's name is illegitimate. Auguste Nicolas Pomel published the currently used name in 1874, the specific epithet munbyi honouring Munbyi.

== Phylogeny ==
Molecular phylogenetic studies place C. munbyi in a clade with Cistus clusii within the larger white and whitish pink clade of Cistus species, sister to all the remaining white and whitish pink flowered species.

Species-level cladogram of Cistus species

- - Halimium spp.
  - - Halimium spp.
    - - PPC
        - Cistus crispus
        - - - Cistus heterophyllus
            - - Cistus albidus
              - Cistus creticus
          - - Cistus asper
            - Cistus chinamadensis
            - Cistus horrens
            - Cistus ocreatus
            - Cistus osbeckiifolius
            - Cistus palmensis
            - Cistus symphytifolius
  - WWPC
    - - Cistus clusii
      - Cistus munbyi
    - - Cistus inflatus
      - Cistus ladanifer
      - Cistus laurifolius
      - Cistus libanotis
      - Cistus monspeliensis
      - Cistus parviflorus
      - Cistus populifolius
      - Cistus pouzolzii
      - Cistus salviifolius
      - Cistus sintenisii

Species-level cladogram of Cistus species, based on plastid and nuclear DNA sequences

== Distribution and habitat ==
Cistus munbyi is native to western north Africa, occurring at elevations of up to 100 metres (330 ft) along the Mediterranean coasts of Morocco and Algeria. It occurs in dry, sunny locations, generally in alkaline soils among bushy vegetation. Munby's description was based on a specimen from the cliffs east of Oran.
