= Cistus × purpureus =

Species of flowering plant

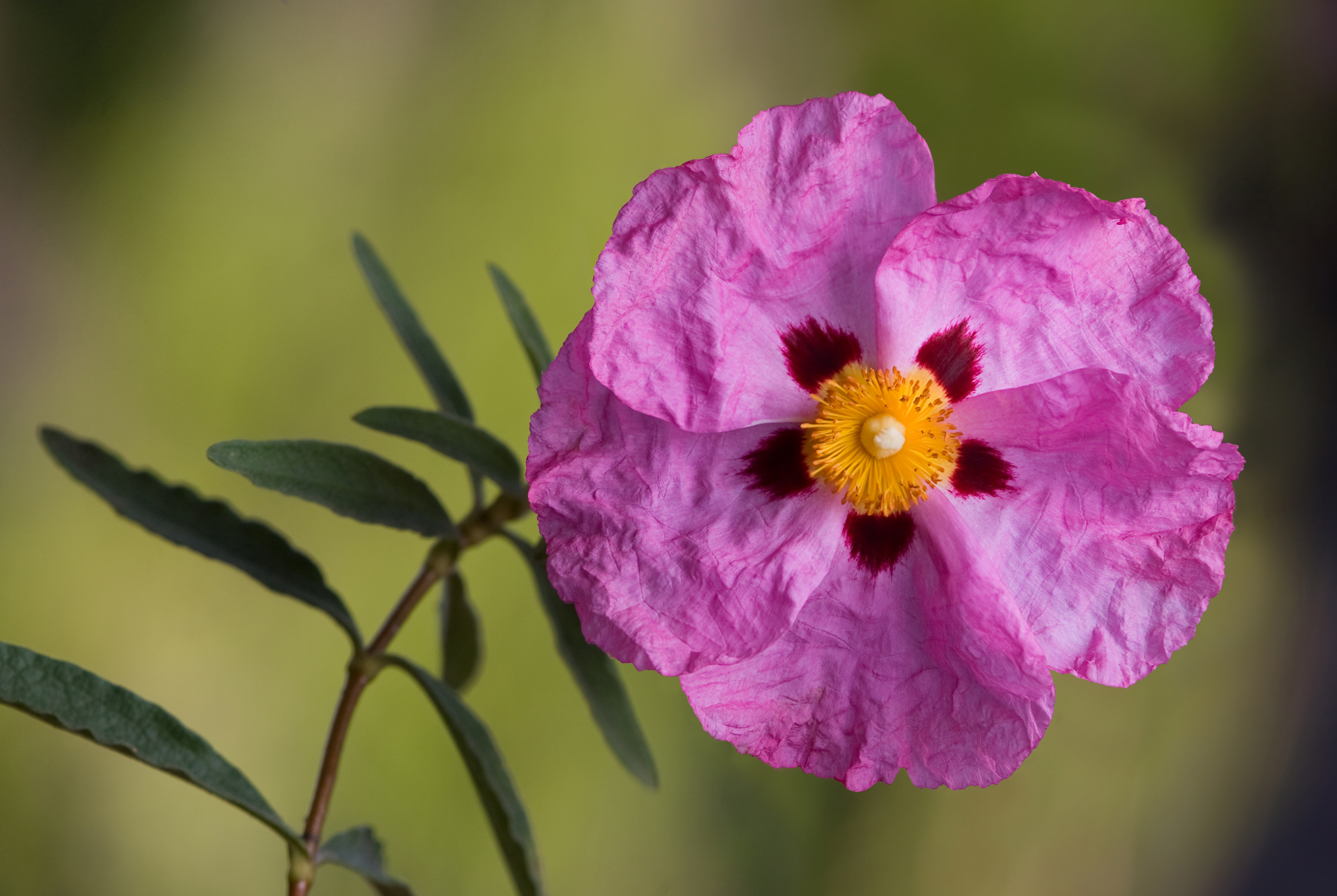
- Genus: Cistus
- Hybrid parentage: Cistus ladanifer × Cistus creticus
- Cultivar: x purpureus

Cistus × purpureus, commonly known as orchid rockrose, is one of the most commonly cultivated varieties of rockrose.

== Description ==
It is a small and bushy subshrub that grows 120cm to 180cm high and wide with wavy, dense, dull green leaves.

The pink flowers, which appear from spring to summer, are 8cm (3 in) across that have petals with a dark blotch towards the centre. Each flower lasts a day, though a succession of flowers appear throughout the flowering season.

== Taxonomy ==
The hybrid cultivar was first formally described in 1786 by Jean-Baptiste Lamarck in the botany division of the Encyclopédie méthodique par ordre des matières.
