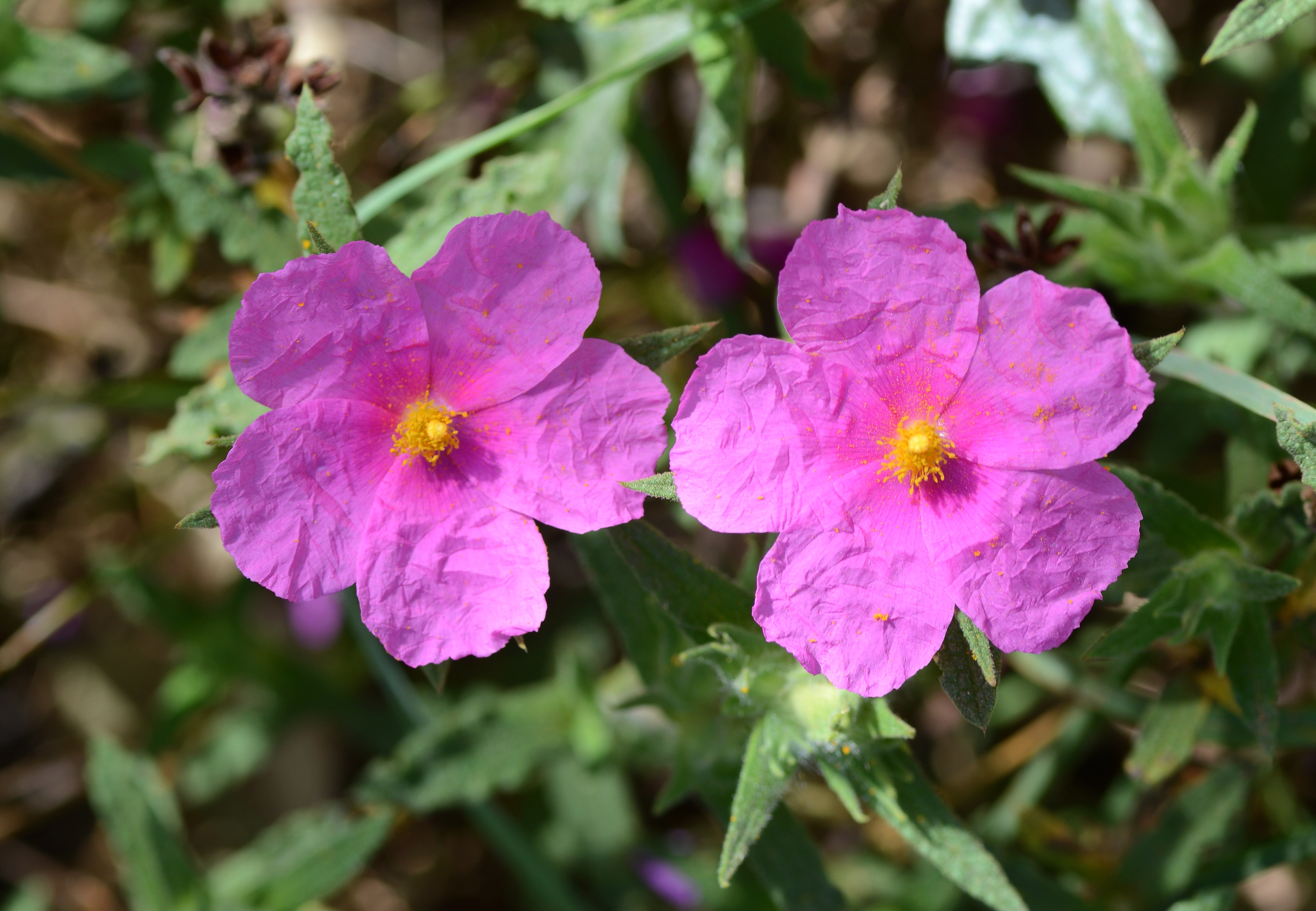

Scientific classification
- Kingdom: Plantae
- Clade: Embryophytes
- Clade: Tracheophytes
- Clade: Spermatophytes
- Clade: Angiosperms
- Clade: Eudicots
- Clade: Rosids
- Order: Malvales
- Family: Cistaceae
- Genus: Cistus
- Species: C. crispus

Binomial name
- Cistus crispus L.

= Cistus crispus =

Species of flowering plant

Cistus crispus is a shrubby species of flowering plant in the family Cistaceae, with pink to purple flowers, native to south-western Europe and western north Africa.

== Description ==
Cistus crispus grows up to 50 cm (1 ft 8 in) tall. Its grey-green leaves are wavy (undulate), oblong to elliptical in shape, usually 1–4 cm (0.4–1.6 in) long by 4–15 mm (0.2–0.6 in) wide. They have three prominent veins and are covered a mixture of short stellate hairs and longer simple hairs. The flowers are arranged in few-flowered cymes, each flower being 3–4 cm (1.2–1.6 in) across with five purplish-red petals and five hair-covered sepals.

== Taxonomy ==
Cistus crispus was first described by Carl Linnaeus in 1753 in Species Plantarum (p. 524). The specific epithet crispus means "curly" or "finely waved", referring to the leaves.

It hybridizes with Cistus albidus to form the hybrid Cistus × incanus.

== Phylogeny ==
A 2011 molecular phylogenetic study placed C. crispus as the deepest branching member of the clade of purple and pink flowered Cistus species (the "purple pink clade" or PPC).

Species-level cladogram of Cistus species.

- - Halimium spp.
  - - Halimium spp.
    - - PPC
        - Cistus crispus
        - - - Cistus heterophyllus
            - - Cistus albidus
              - Cistus creticus
          - - Cistus asper
            - Cistus chinamadensis
            - Cistus horrens
            - Cistus ocreatus
            - Cistus osbeckiifolius
            - Cistus palmensis
            - Cistus symphytifolius
  - WWPC
    - - Cistus clusii
      - Cistus munbyi
    - - Cistus inflatus
      - Cistus ladanifer
      - Cistus laurifolius
      - Cistus libanotis
      - Cistus monspeliensis
      - Cistus parviflorus
      - Cistus populifolius
      - Cistus pouzolzii
      - Cistus salviifolius
      - Cistus sintenisii

Species-level cladogram of Cistus species, based on plastid and nuclear DNA sequences

== Distribution ==
Cistus crispus is native to north Africa and south-western Europe, including Portugal, Spain, France, Corsica, Italy and Sicily.
