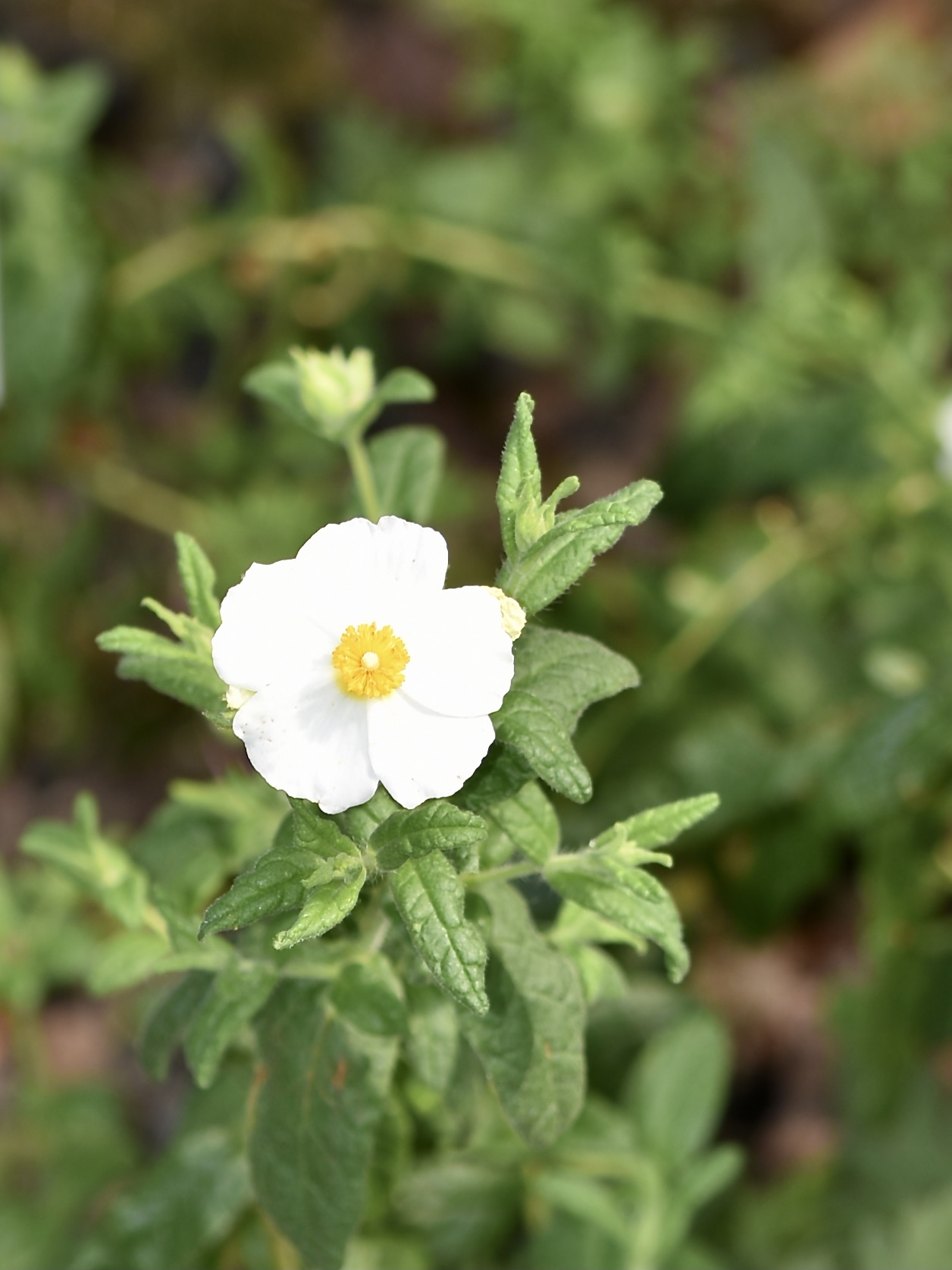

Conservation status
- Least Concern (IUCN 3.1)

Scientific classification
- Kingdom: Plantae
- Clade: Tracheophytes
- Clade: Angiosperms
- Clade: Eudicots
- Clade: Rosids
- Order: Malvales
- Family: Cistaceae
- Genus: Cistus
- Species: C. inflatus

Binomial name
- Cistus inflatus Pourr. ex J.-P.Demoly

Synonyms
- Cistus hirsutus Lam. (1786), nom. illeg., non Lam. (1779); Cistus psilosepalus auct., non Sweet

= Cistus inflatus =

Species of flowering plants

Cistus inflatus is a shrubby species of flowering plant in the family Cistaceae, often known as Cistus psilosepalus, although this name is a synonym of the hybrid Cistus × laxus. It has white flowers.

== Description ==
Cistus inflatus is a slightly spreading shrub, up to 1 m (3 ft) tall. It leaves are green, oblong in shape, usually 2–6 cm (0.8–2.4 in) long by 5–20 mm (0.2–0.8 in) wide, with turned under (revolute) margins, variably hairy, with long simple and stellate hairs on both sides. The leaves are unstalked (sessile) and, at least near the base, have three veins. The flowers are arranged in cymes with one to five individual flowers, each 4–6 cm (1.6–2.4 in) across with five white petals with narrowed yellow bases, and five sepals. The style is very short.

== Taxonomy ==
Cistus inflatus has a somewhat confused nomenclatural history. In 1786, Jean-Baptiste Lamarck described this species under the name Cistus hirsutus, but it was an illegitimate name since he had earlier used it for a different species. In 1826, Robert Sweet published the name Cistus psilosepalus, which was then applied to this species by many authors. In 1997, Jean-Pierre Demoly identified Sweet's type as C. × laxus Aiton, a hybrid between this species and C. populifolius. As the name Cistus laxus was published by Aiton in 1789, it has priority over the name Cistus psilosepalus, which becomes a synonym. Demoly revived a name used (but not published) by Pierre André Pourret, namely C. inflatus.

In summary, in Demoly's analysis:

- Cistus psilosepalus Sweet is a synonym of Cistus × laxus Aiton
- Cistus psilosepalus auct., non Sweet has incorrectly been used for what is now Cistus inflatus Pourr. ex J.-P.Demoly

Sweet called his C. psilosepalus "the smooth sepaled rock-rose" (the meaning of the epithet), describing it as "differing from all others ... by its smooth glossy sepals", whereas later sources (including Flora Europaea) described C. psilosepalus as having hairy sepals. In C. × laxus the backs of the outer sepals are hairless (glabrous); in C. inflatus they are hairy.

A 2011 molecular phylogenetic study placed C. inflatus in the white and whitish pink clade of Cistus species. No particularly close relationship to any other species in the clade was identified.

== Phylogeny ==
Cistus inflatus belongs to the white and whitish pink flowered clade of Cistus species.

Species-level cladogram of Cistus species.

- - Halimium spp.
  - - Halimium spp.
    - - PPC
        - Cistus crispus
        - - - Cistus heterophyllus
            - - Cistus albidus
              - Cistus creticus
          - - Cistus asper
            - Cistus chinamadensis
            - Cistus horrens
            - Cistus ocreatus
            - Cistus osbeckiifolius
            - Cistus palmensis
            - Cistus symphytifolius
  - WWPC
    - - Cistus clusii
      - Cistus munbyi
    - - Cistus inflatus
      - Cistus ladanifer
      - Cistus laurifolius
      - Cistus libanotis
      - Cistus monspeliensis
      - Cistus parviflorus
      - Cistus populifolius
      - Cistus pouzolzii
      - Cistus salviifolius
      - Cistus sintenisii

Species-level cladogram of Cistus species, based on plastid and nuclear DNA sequences.

== Distribution ==
Cistus inflatus (generally recorded as C. psilosepalus) is native to Portugal, western Spain, and two small regions of north-west France.
