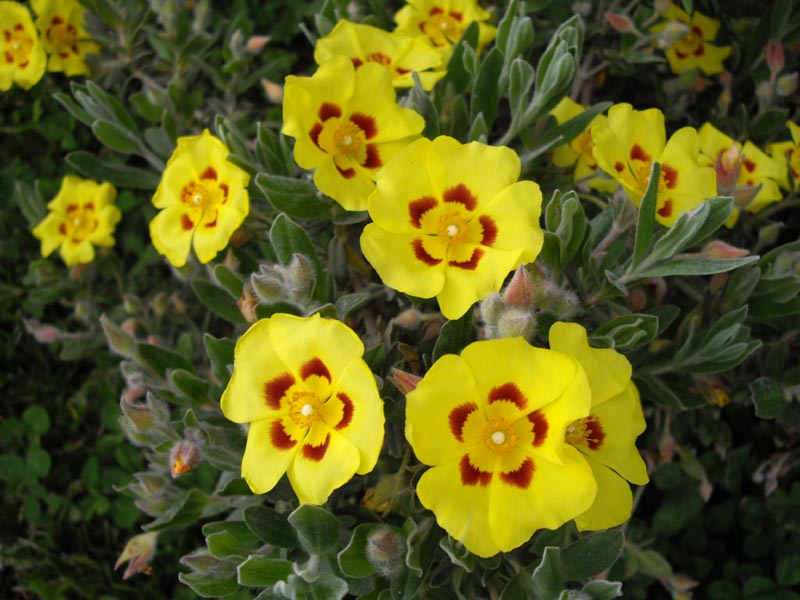

Scientific classification
- Kingdom: Plantae
- Clade: Tracheophytes
- Clade: Angiosperms
- Clade: Eudicots
- Clade: Rosids
- Order: Malvales
- Family: Cistaceae
- Genus: Cistus
- Species: C. lasianthus

Binomial name
- Cistus lasianthus Lam. (1786)

Subspecies
- Cistus lasianthus subsp. alyssoides (Lam.) Demoly; Cistus lasianthus subsp. lasianthus

Synonyms
- Halimium alyssoides subsp. lasianthum (Lam.) Rivas Mart. (1977 publ. 1978); Halimium cheiranthoides proles lasianthum (Lam.) Samp. (1922), nom. superfl.; Halimium lasianthum (Lam.) Spach (1836); Helianthemum lasianthum (Lam.) Pers. (1806); Stegitris lasianthus (Lam.) Raf. (1838)

= Cistus lasianthus =

Species of flowering plant

Cistus lasianthus, the Lisbon false sun-rose or woolly rock rose, is a species of flowering plant in the family Cistaceae, native to the Iberian Peninsula (Portugal, western Spain and southwestern France) and Northwest Africa (Morocco). It is a spreading evergreen shrub growing to 1 m (3 ft) tall by 1.5 m (5 ft) wide, with grey-green leaves and bright yellow flowers in spring. The flowers may have a maroon blotch at the base of each petal.

In cultivation this plant requires sandy soil and full sun.
