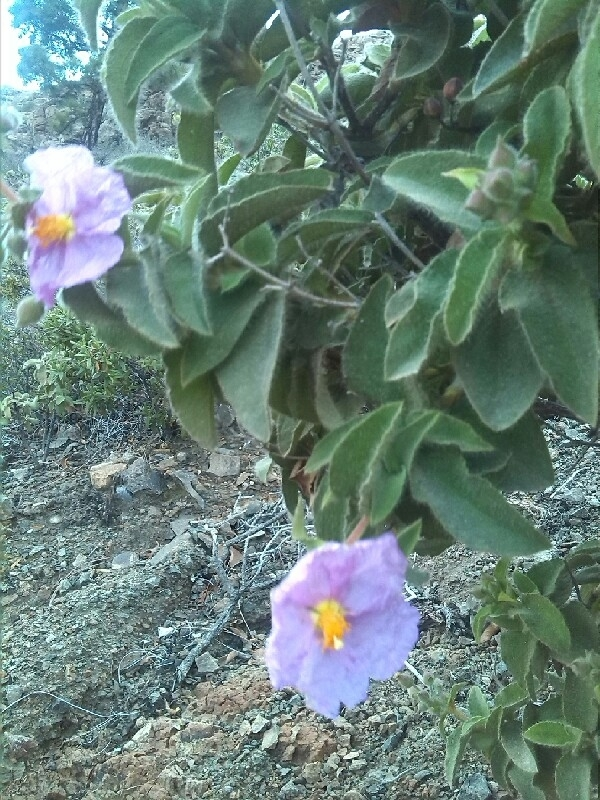

Scientific classification
- Kingdom: Plantae
- Clade: Embryophytes
- Clade: Tracheophytes
- Clade: Spermatophytes
- Clade: Angiosperms
- Clade: Eudicots
- Clade: Rosids
- Order: Malvales
- Family: Cistaceae
- Genus: Cistus
- Species: C. horrens

Binomial name
- Cistus horrens Demoly

= Cistus horrens =

Species of flowering plant

Cistus horrens is a shrubby species of flowering plant in the family Cistaceae, with purple to pink flowers. It is endemic to Gran Canaria in the Canary Islands. First described as a species in 2004, it was previously identified as Cistus symphytifolius, which it resembles.

== Description ==
Cistus horrens generally resembles the more widespread Cistus symphytifolius. Differences include young branches covered with simple hairs; leaf blades grayer and shorter, densely covered with simple, glandular and stellate hairs on the upper surface and with longer simple hairs on the lower surface, with glandular hairs only on the nerves; sepals densely covered with simple hairs; and smaller fruiting capsules with fewer seeds. The leaves are elliptical to lanceolate, stalked (petiolate) and have netted (reticulate) veins. The stigmas are longer than the stamens.

== Taxonomy and phylogeny ==
Cistus horrens was first described as a new species by Jean-Pierre Demoly in 2004; it had previously been treated as C. symphytifolius. The specific epithet horrens is Latin for "standing erect, bristling".

A 2011 molecular phylogenetic study placed C. horrens as a member of the purple and pink flowered clade (PPC) of Cistus species, along with some other Canary Island endemics (Cistus asper, Cistus chinamadensis, Cistus ocreatus, and Cistus symphytifolius).

Species-level cladogram of Cistus species.

- - Halimium spp.
  - - Halimium spp.
    - - PPC
        - Cistus crispus
        - - - Cistus heterophyllus
            - - Cistus albidus
              - Cistus creticus
          - - Cistus asper
            - Cistus chinamadensis
            - Cistus horrens
            - Cistus ocreatus
            - Cistus osbeckiifolius
            - Cistus palmensis
            - Cistus symphytifolius
  - WWPC
    - - Cistus clusii
      - Cistus munbyi
    - - Cistus inflatus
      - Cistus ladanifer
      - Cistus laurifolius
      - Cistus libanotis
      - Cistus monspeliensis
      - Cistus parviflorus
      - Cistus populifolius
      - Cistus pouzolzii
      - Cistus salviifolius
      - Cistus sintenisii

Species-level cladogram of Cistus species, based on plastid and nuclear DNA sequences

== Distribution and habitat ==
Cistus horrens is endemic to Gran Canaria in the Canary Islands, being found in the south-west sector of the island. It is typically found at elevations of 300–1,500 metres (1,000–4,900 ft) in pine forests, in semiarid conditions.
