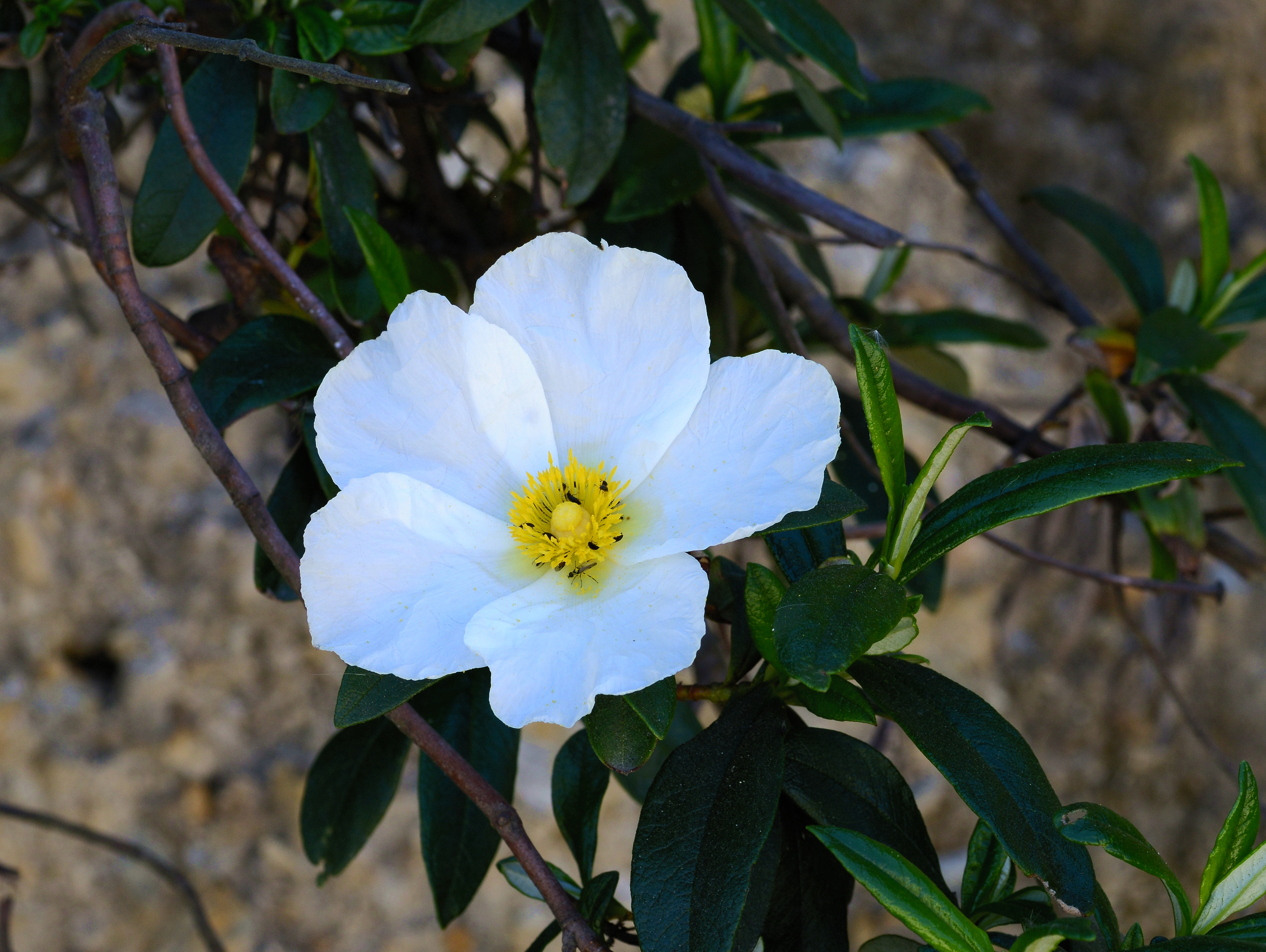
- Cistus monspeliensis

Scientific classification
- Kingdom: Plantae
- Clade: Embryophytes
- Clade: Tracheophytes
- Clade: Spermatophytes
- Clade: Angiosperms
- Clade: Eudicots
- Clade: Rosids
- Order: Malvales
- Family: Cistaceae
- Genus: Cistus; L. (1753)

Species
- 34; see text

Synonyms
- Halimiocistus Janch. (1925); Halimium (Dunal) Spach (1836); Ladanium Spach (1836); Ladanum Raf. (1838), nom. illeg.; Ledonia Spach (1836); Libanotis Raf. (1838), nom. illeg.; Rhodocistus Spach (1836); Stegitris Raf. (1838); Stephanocarpus Spach (1836); Strobon Raf. (1838)

= Cistus =

Genus of flowering plants

Cistus (from the Greek kistos) is a genus of flowering plants in the rockrose family Cistaceae, containing about 34 species and a similar number of natural hybrids. They are perennial shrubs found on dry or rocky soils throughout the Mediterranean region, from Morocco, Spain, Italy, Greece, through to the Middle East, and also on the Canary Islands.

Cistus, with its many hybrids and cultivars, is commonly encountered as a garden flower.

The common name rock-rose or rockrose is applied to the species, a name also shared by the related genera Helianthemum and Tuberaria, all in the same family Cistaceae. The common name gum cistus is also applied to resin-bearing species, especially C. ladanifer.

== Description ==
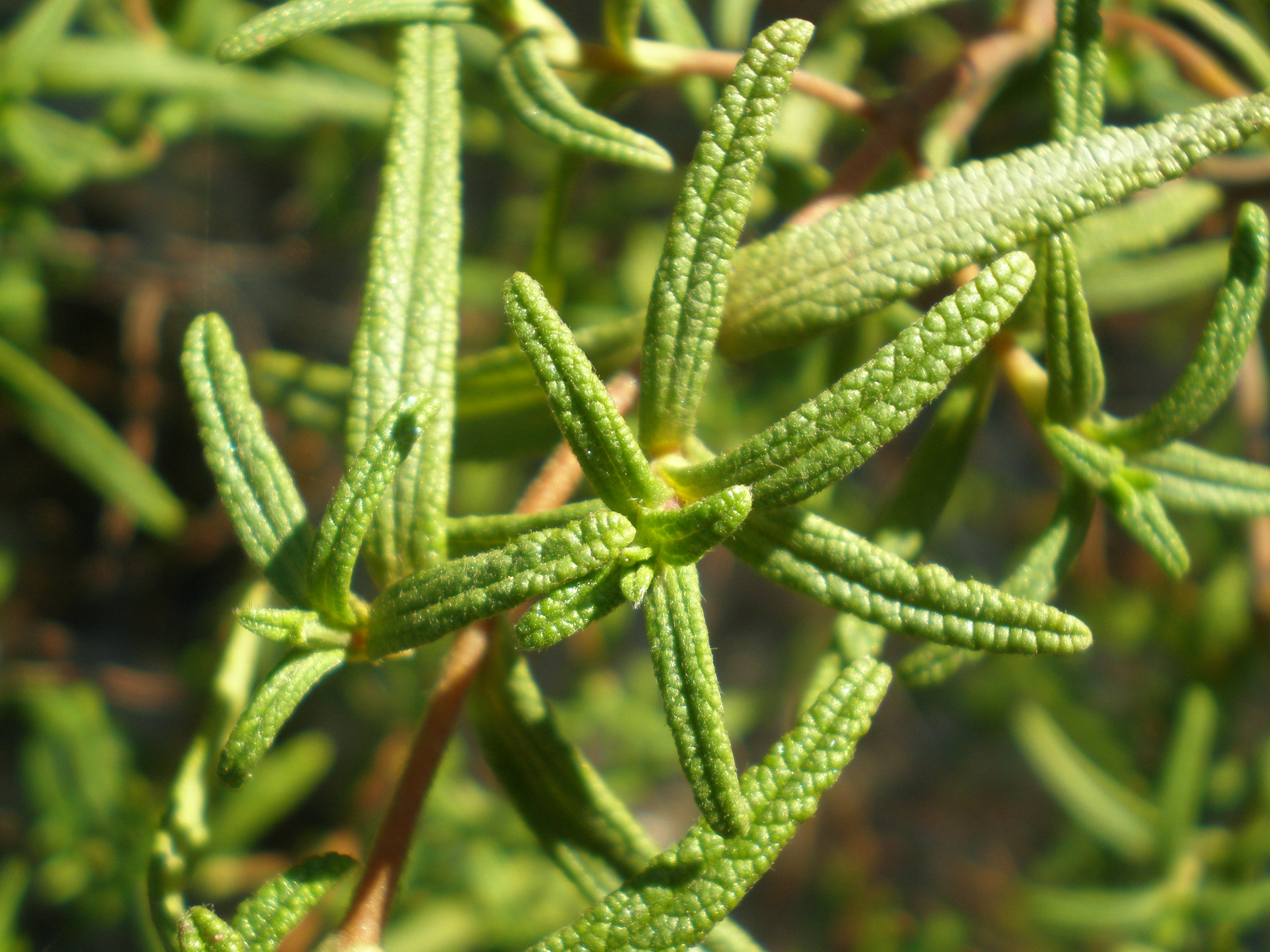
Evergreen leaves of a Cistus species (Cistus monspeliensis)

The leaves are evergreen, opposite, simple, usually slightly rough-surfaced, 2–8 cm long. In a few species (notably C. ladanifer), the leaves are coated with a highly aromatic resin called labdanum.

They have showy 5-petaled flowers ranging from white to purple and dark pink, in a few species with a conspicuous dark red spot at the base of each petal.

== Taxonomy ==
=== Phylogeny ===
Cistus and Halimium form a cohesive and the most derived clade within Cistaceae. Plants of the World Online and World Flora Online treat Halimium as a synonym of Cistus. Molecular phylogenetic analyses conducted between 2005 and 2011 confirm that Cistus species divide into two well-defined clades, neither of which was fully resolved internally. The first clade consists of those with purple and pink flowers (the "purple pink clade" or PPC). The second clade consists of those with white flowers or, in the case of Cistus parviflorus, pale pink flowers (the "white or whitish pink clade" or WWPC). Although the flower colour of C. parviflorus is anomalous, it has very short styles, otherwise characteristic of WWPC species. A hybrid origin has been suggested. A simplified cladogram is shown below:

Species-level cladogram of Cistus species

- - Halimium spp.
  - - Halimium spp.
    - - PPC
        - Cistus crispus
        - - - Cistus heterophyllus
            - - Cistus albidus
              - Cistus creticus
          - - Cistus asper
            - Cistus chinamadensis
            - Cistus horrens
            - Cistus ocreatus
            - Cistus osbeckiifolius
            - Cistus palmensis
            - Cistus symphytifolius
  - WWPC
    - - Cistus clusii
      - Cistus munbyi
    - - Cistus inflatus
      - Cistus ladanifer
      - Cistus laurifolius
      - Cistus libanotis
      - Cistus monspeliensis
      - Cistus parviflorus
      - Cistus populifolius
      - Cistus pouzolzii
      - Cistus salviifolius
      - Cistus sintenisii

Species-level cladogram of Cistus species, based on plastid and nuclear DNA sequences

Within the purple pink clade (PPC), C. crispus is consistently the first diverging species. C. albidus, C. creticus and C. heterophyllus form a well supported clade. Seven species endemic to the Canary Islands form a polytomy, resolved differently in different analyses, in which subtaxa of some species do not always cluster together. Within the white and whitish pink clade (WWPC), there is weak support for a clade consisting of C. clusii and C. munbyi; the other species either formed part of a polytomy or resolved differently in different analyses. Halimium and Cistus were regularly shown to be paraphyletic with respect to one another.

=== Species ===
The following species are recognised in the genus Cistus:

- Cistus albidus L.
- Cistus asper Demoly & R.Mesa
- Cistus atlanticus (Humbert & Maire) Demoly
- Cistus atriplicifolius Lam.
- Cistus calycinus L.
- Cistus chinamadensis Bañares & P.Romero
- Cistus clusii Dunal
- Cistus creticus L.
- Cistus crispus L.
- Cistus formosus Curtis
- Cistus grancanariae Marrero Rodr., R.S.Almeida & C.Ríos
- Cistus halimifolius L.
- Cistus heterophyllus Desf.
- Cistus horrens Demoly
- Cistus inflatus Pourr. ex J.-P.Demoly, syn. Cistus psilosepalus Sweet
- Cistus ladanifer L., including Cistus palhinhae N.D.Ingram – Gum Rockrose
- Cistus lasianthus Lam.
- Cistus lasiocalycinus (Boiss. & Reut.) Byng & Christenh.
- Cistus laurifolius L.
- Cistus libanotis L.
- Cistus macrocalycinus (Pau) Byng & Christenh.
- Cistus monspeliensis L. – Montpellier Cistus
- Cistus munbyi Pomel
- Cistus ocreatus C.Sm.
- Cistus ocymoides Lam.
- Cistus osbeckiifolius Webb
- Cistus palhinhae N.D.Ingram
- Cistus palmensis Bañares & Demoly
- Cistus parviflorus Lam.
- Cistus populifolius L.
- Cistus pouzolzii Delile ex Gren. & Godr.
- Cistus salviifolius L. – Salvia Cistus
- Cistus sintenisii Litard. (syn. C. albanicus)
- Cistus symphytifolius Lam.
- Cistus tauricus C.Presl
- Cistus umbellatus L.

=== Gallery ===
Various species of Cistus

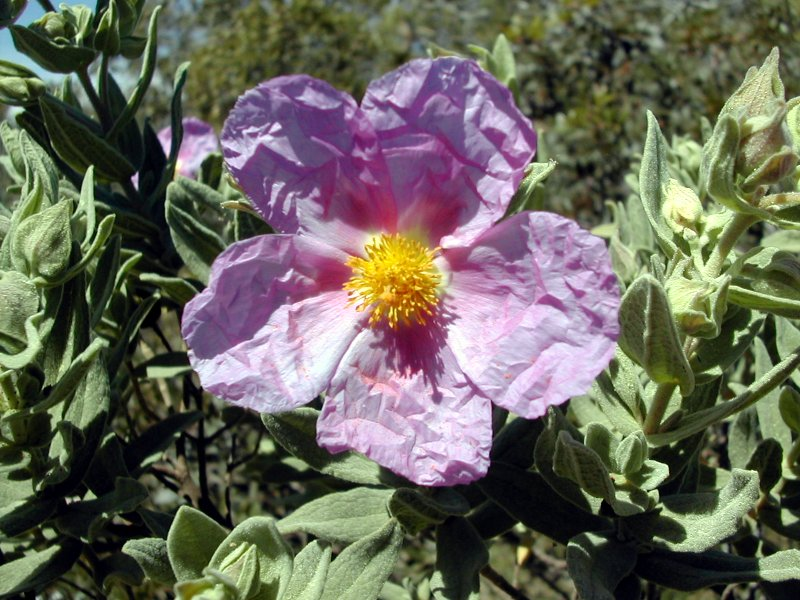
Cistus albidus photo taken near Sitges

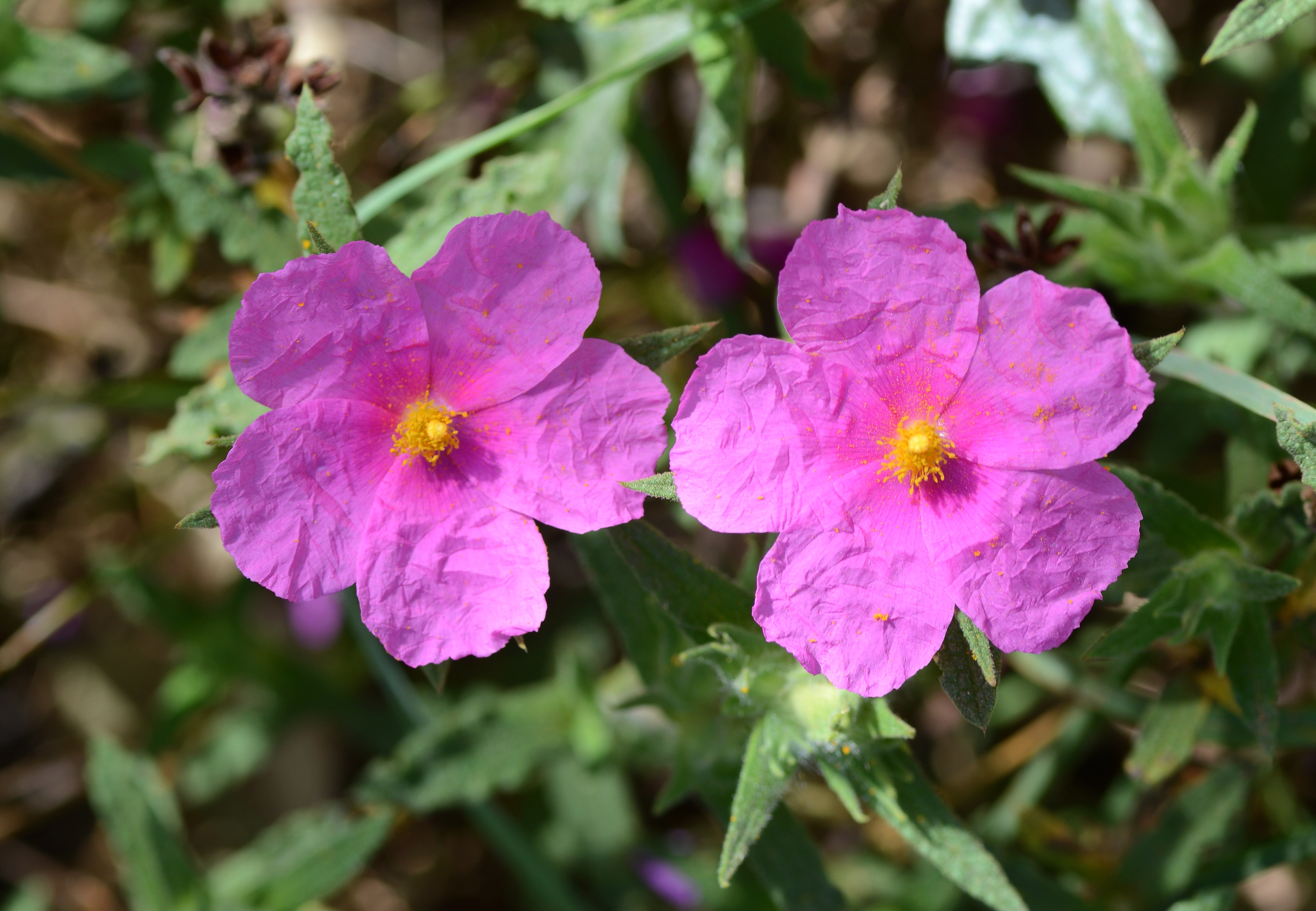
Cistus crispus

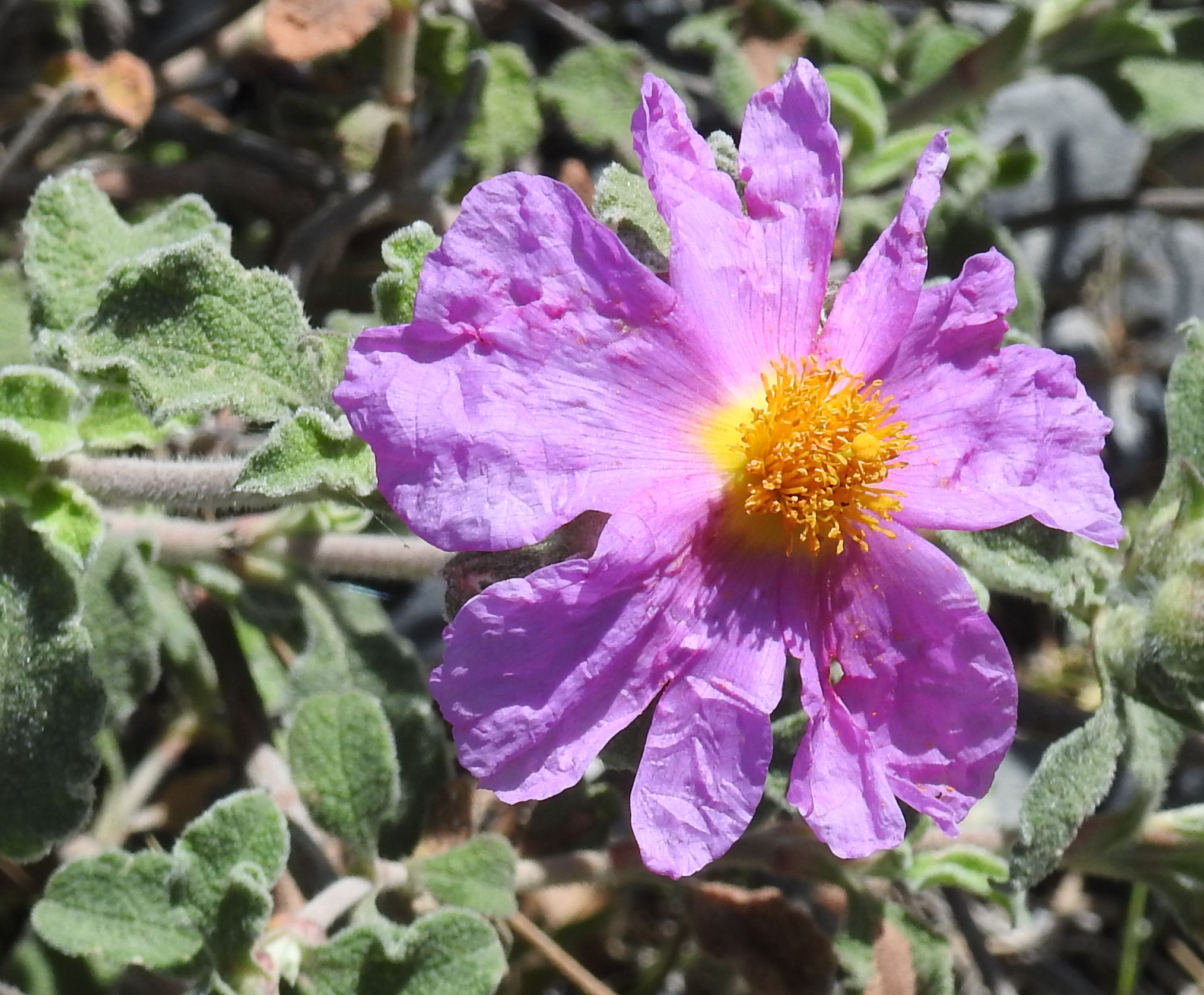
Cistus creticus from Crete

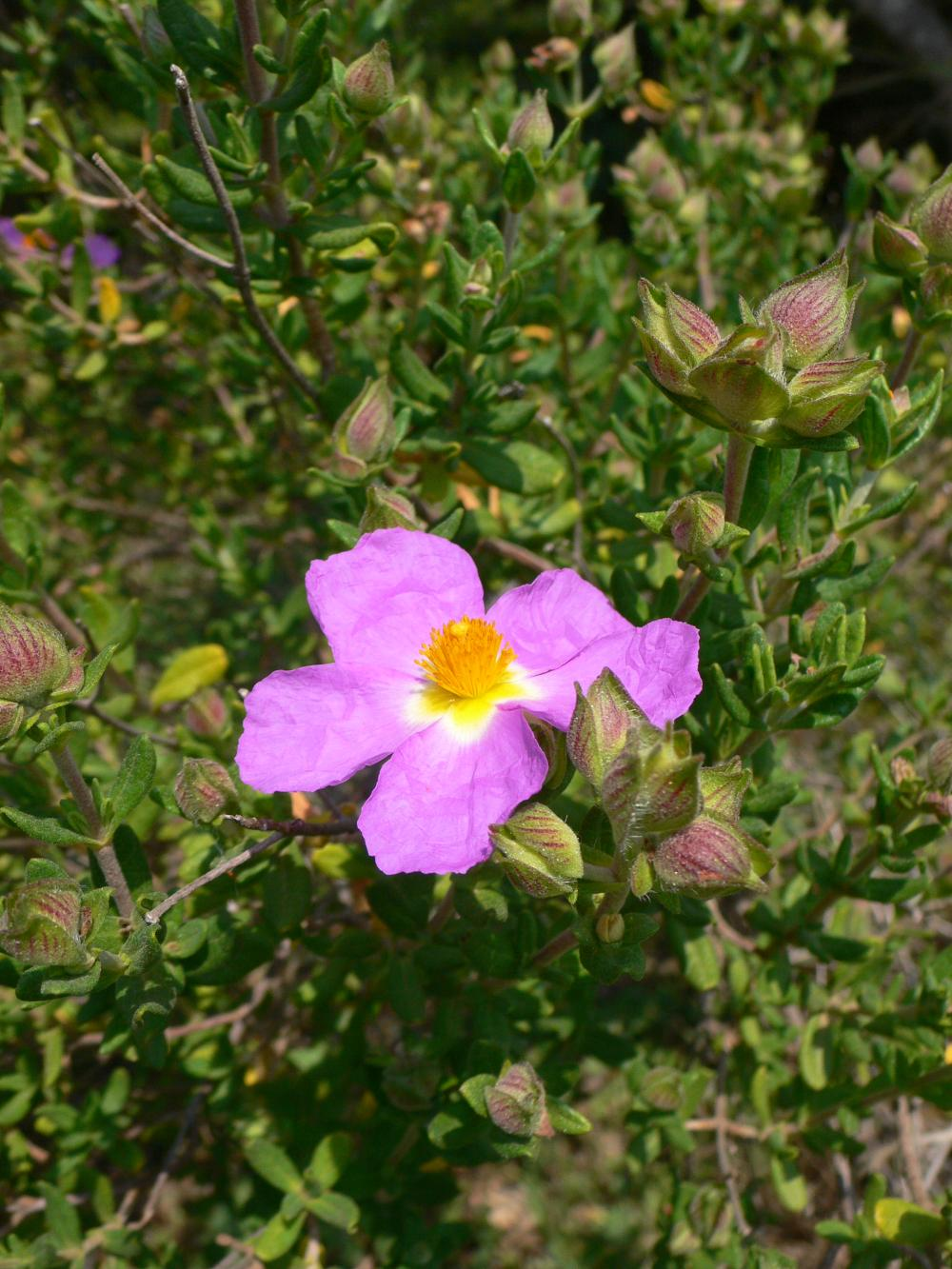
Cistus heterophyllus subsp. carthaginensis. Critically endangered cistus from Cartagena (Spain).

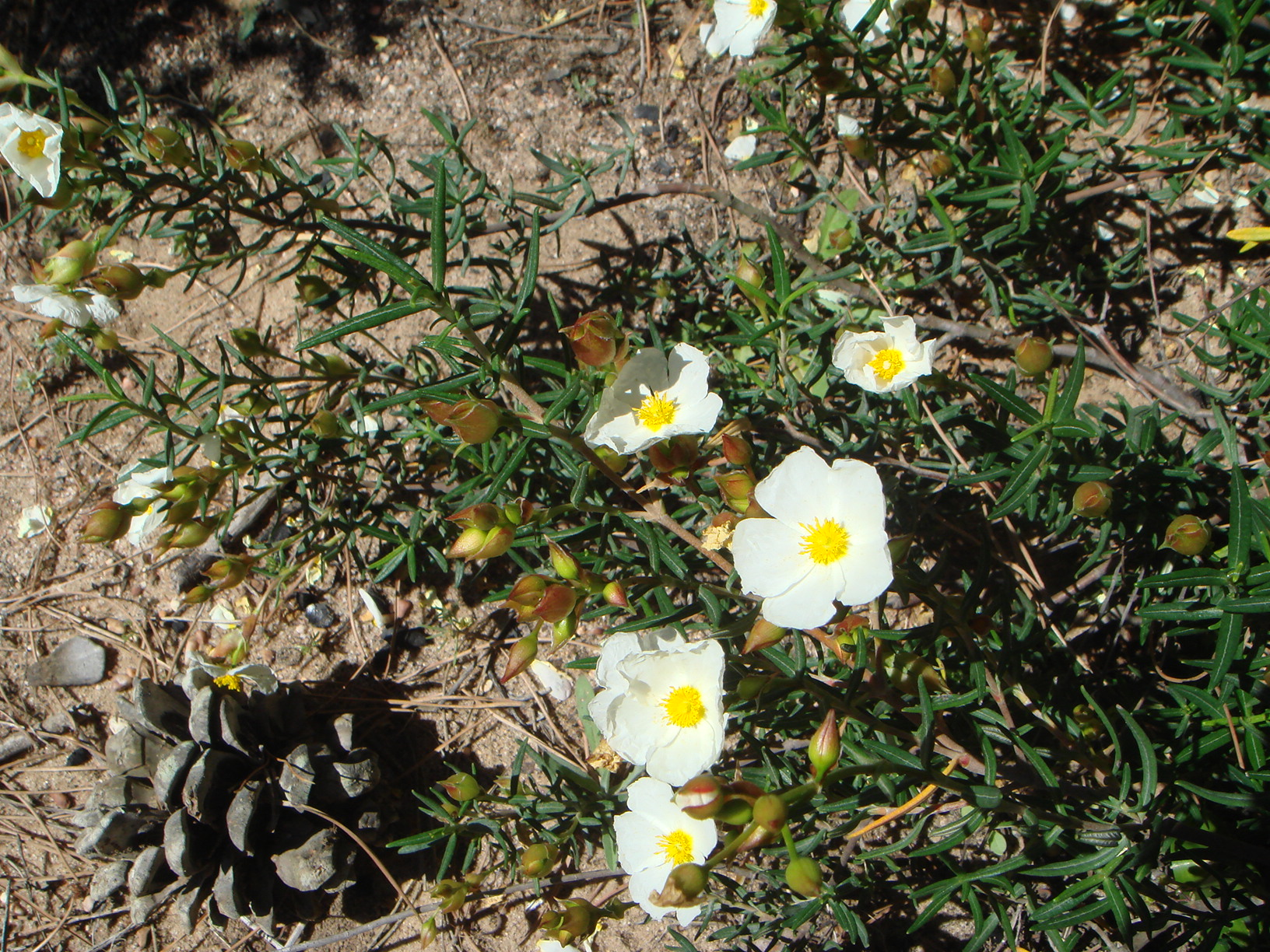
Cistus libanotis near Cádiz

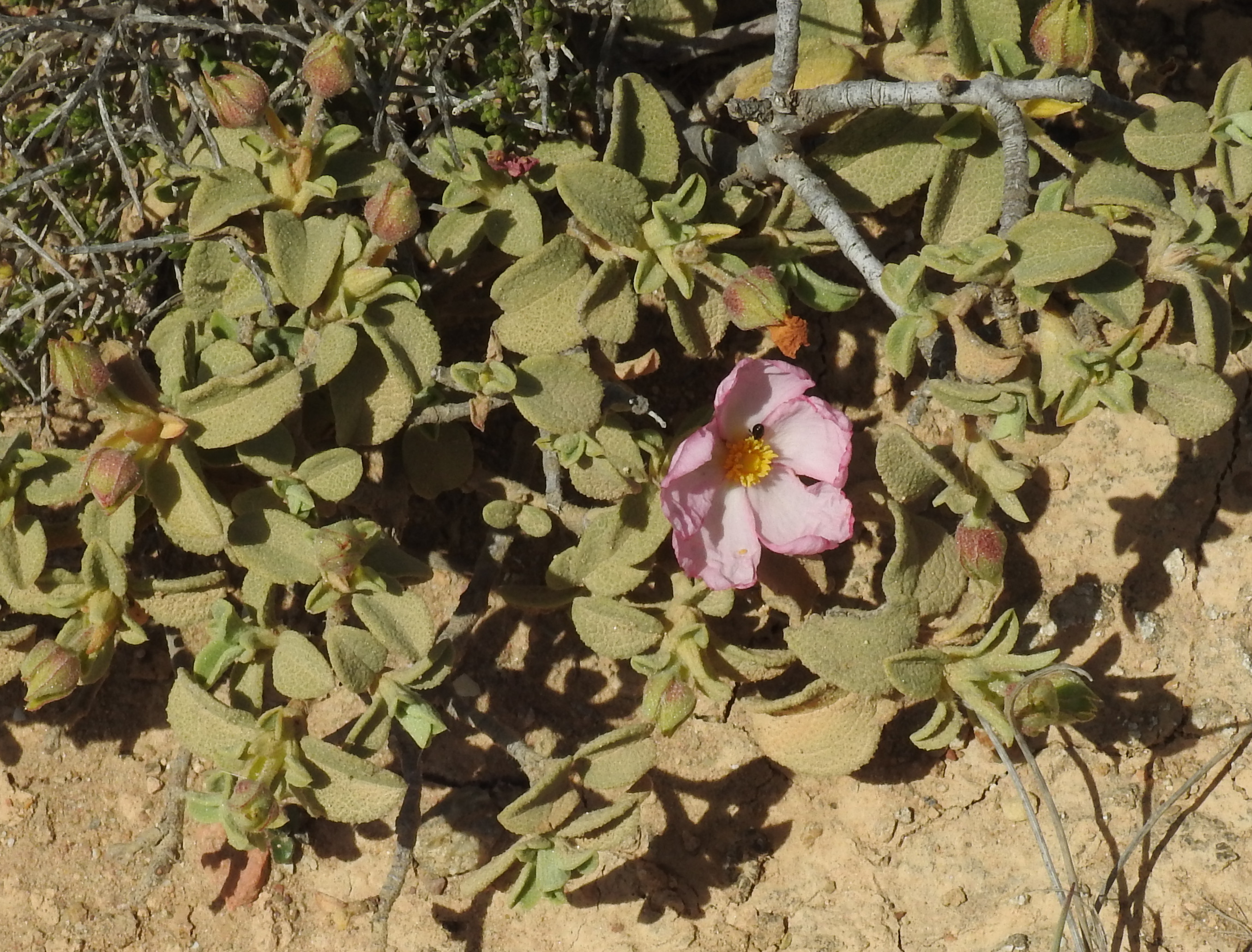
Cistus parviflorus from Crete

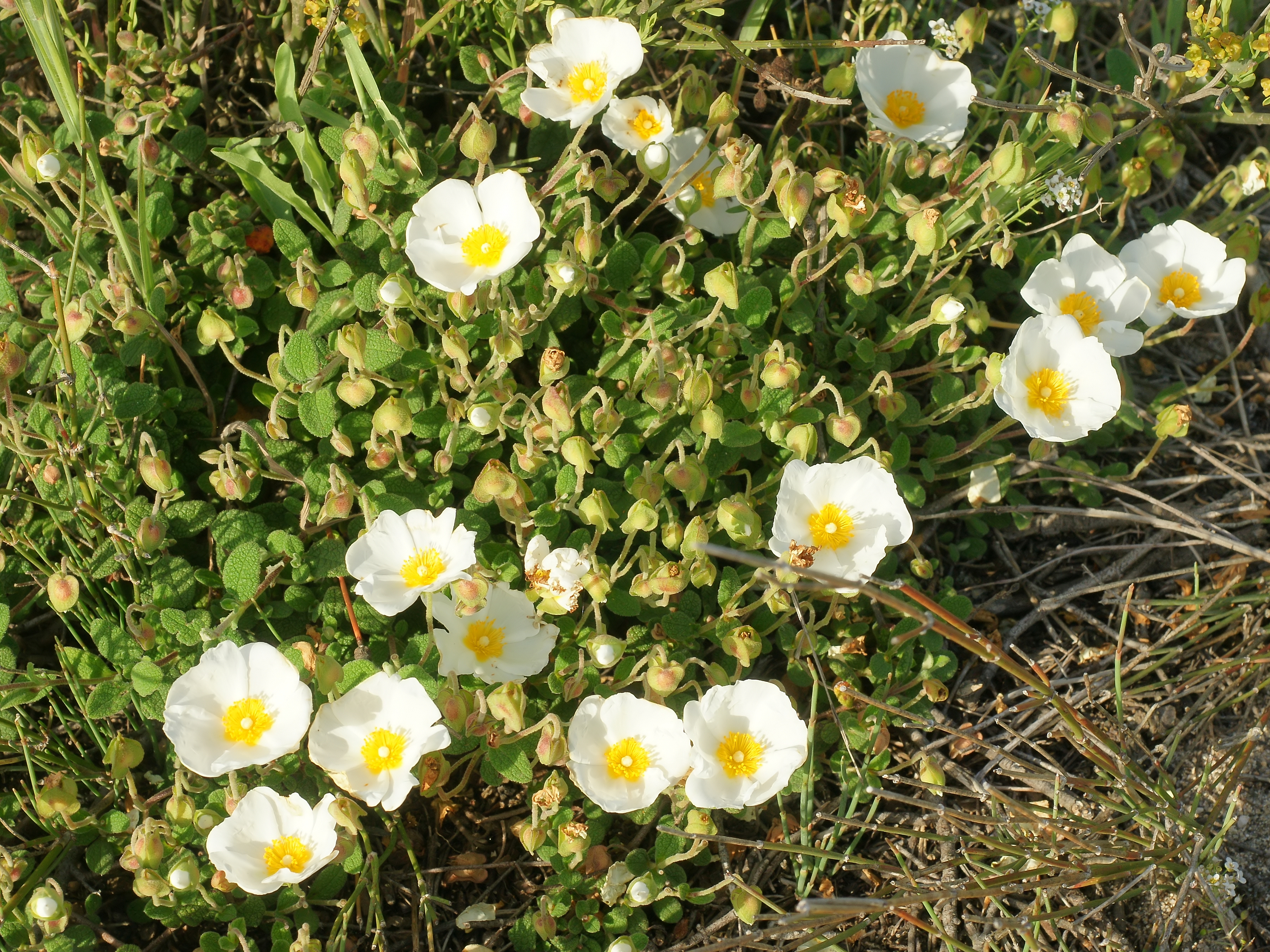
Cistus salviifolius

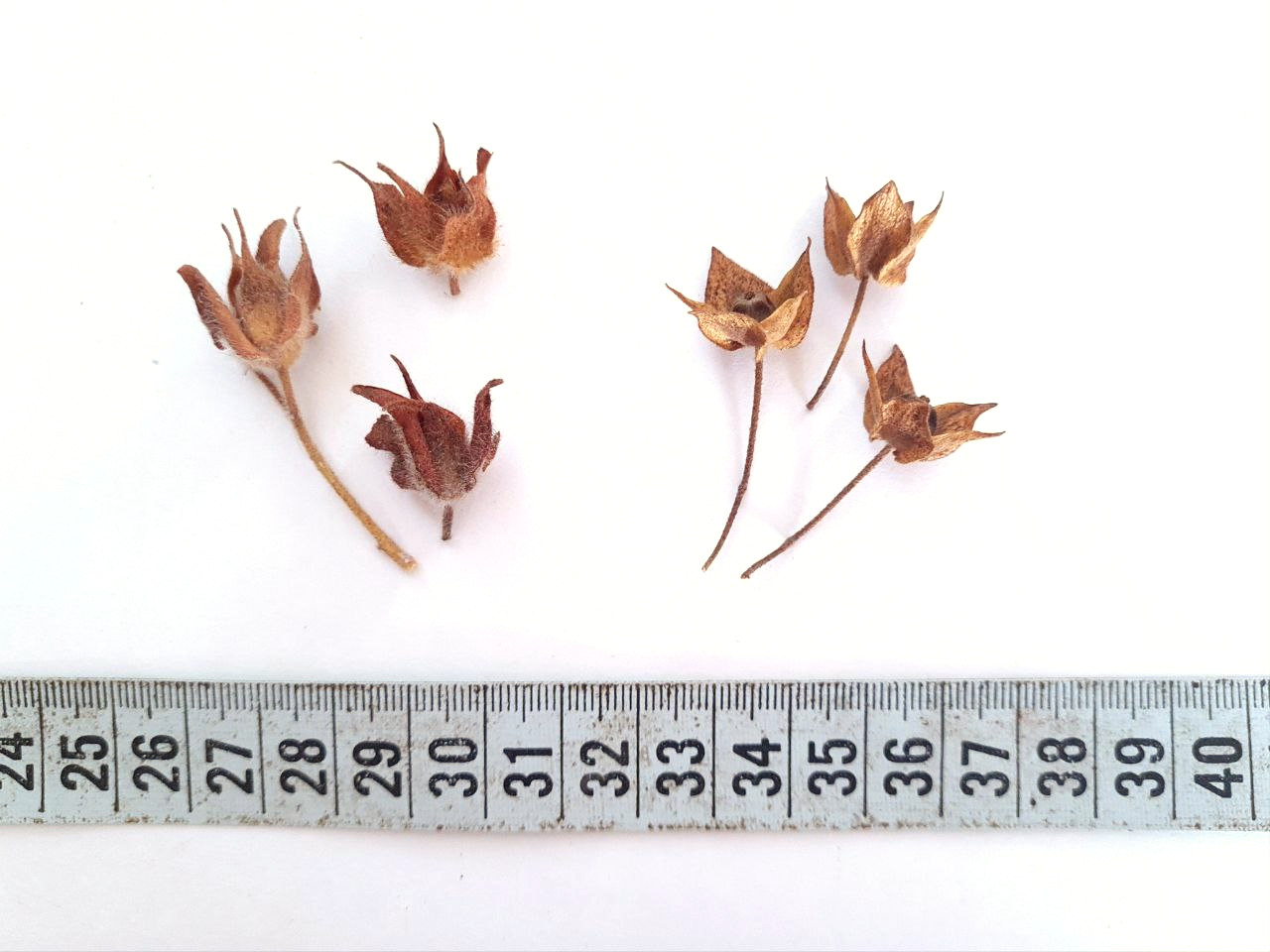
Fruits of Cistus salviifolius (right) and Cistus creticus (left), Israel

=== Hybrids ===
In addition a large number of hybrids have been recorded, including:

- Cistus × aguilari O.E.Warb. (C. ladanifer × C. populifolius)
- Cistus × akamantis Demoly
- Cistus × banaresii Demoly
- Cistus × candidus (Sweet) Demoly
- Cistus × canescens Sweet
- Cistus × cebennensis Aubin & J.Prudhomme
- Cistus × cheiranthoides Lam.
- Cistus × clausonii Font Quer & Maire
- Cistus × conradiae Demoly
- Cistus × cyprius Lam. (C. ladanifer × C. laurifolius)
- Cistus × dansereaui P.Silva (C. ladanifer × C. inflatus)
- Cistus × escartianus Demoly
- Cistus × florentinus Lam. (C. monspeliensis × C. salviifolius)
- Cistus × hybridus Pourr.
- Cistus × incanus L. (C. albidus × C. crispus)
- Cistus × ingwersenii Demoly
- Cistus × laxus Aiton (C. populifolius × C. inflatus ?)
- Cistus × ledon Lam. (C. laurifolius × C. monspeliensis)
- Cistus × matritensis Carazo Roman & Jiménez Alb.
- Cistus × nigricans Pourr. (C. populifolius × C. monspeliensis)
- Cistus × novus Rouy
- Cistus × obtusifolius Sweet (C. inflatus × C. salviifolius)
- Cistus × pauranthus Demoly (C. parviflorus × C. salviifolius)
- Cistus × platysepalus Sweet (C. monspeliensis × C. inflatus)
- Cistus × pourretii Rouy & Foucaud
- Cistus × purpureus Lam. (C. ladanifer × C. creticus)
- Cistus × rodiaei Verg. (C. ladanifer × C. albidus)
- Cistus × revolii H.J.Coste & Soulié
- Cistus × sahucii H.J.Coste & Soulié
- Cistus × santae (Sauvage) Demoly
- Cistus × skanbergii Lojac. (C. parviflorus × C. monspeliensis)
- Cistus × stenophyllus Link (C. ladanifer × C. monspeliensis)
- Cistus × timbalii Demoly
- Cistus × verguinii Coste (C. ladanifer × C. salviifolius)
- Cistus × vinyalsii Sennen

== Ecology ==
They are thermophilous plants, which require open, sunny places. This plant genus is peculiar in that it has developed a range of specific adaptations to resist summer drought and frequent disturbance events, such as fire and grazing. In addition, it can form both ectomycorrhizas and arbuscular mycorrhizas. More than 200 ectomycorrhiza-forming fungal species belonging to 40 genera have been reported so far to be associated with Cistus. As with many other Cistaceae, the species of Cistus have the ability to form mycorrhizal associations with truffles (Tuber) and are thus able to thrive on poor sandy soils or rocks. Cistus ladanifer has been found to have mycorrhizal associations with Boletus edulis, Boletus rhodoxanthus, and Laccaria laccata.

Cistus are the only host of Cytinus hypocistis, a small parasitic plant that lives on the roots and is noticeable only for a short period of time when in flower. The presence of the parasite does not seem to harm the host population.

Cistus species are used as food plants by the larvae of some Lepidoptera species including Coleophora confluella and Coleophora helianthemella, the latter recorded on Cistus monspeliensis.

Various Cistus species are known to emit volatile oils, rendering the plants flammable. Their emission of these essential oils is a genetic adaptation for the species intended to actually promote flammability and even cause spontaneous combustion. Cistus plants are therefore considered pyrophytes, or plants which rely upon fire as a part of their life cycle to encourage spread within their biome. Cistus seeds are resistant to the fires allowing them to germinate once fires have subsided and allowing them to benefit from an environment with less competition from other species.

== Cultivation ==
Cistuses are suitable for sunny gardens with a nearly frost-free Mediterranean climate. The hardiest of the species is C. laurifolius, which survived the hard frost at Royal Botanical Gardens at Kew in 1895 that eliminated all the cistuses save this and two white-flowered natural hybrids, C. × corbariensis, already grown by John Tradescant the Elder, and C. × loretii, a 19th-century introduction.

=== Cultivars ===
Cultivars (those marked agm have gained the Royal Horticultural Society's Award of Garden Merit) include:

- C. × aguilarii 'Maculatus' agm
- C. × argenteus 'Peggy Sammons' - pink flowers, grey-green leaves
- C. × bornetianus 'Jester' agm
- C. × cyprius agm
- C. × cyprius var. ellipticus 'Elma' agm
- C. × dansereaui 'Decumbens' agm
- C. × dansereaui 'Jenkyn Place' agm
- C. × florentinus - white flowers
- C. 'Gordon Cooper' agm
- C. × hybridus - pink buds, white flowers
- C. × laxus 'Snow White' agm
- C. × lenis 'Grayswood Pink' agm
- C. × obtusifolius 'Thrive' agm
- 'C. 'Paladin' - large white flowers, dark green leaves
- C. × pulverulentus 'Sunset' agm
- C. × purpureus agm - pink petals with dark blotches near centre
- C. × skanbergii - small pink flowers
- C. 'Snow Fire' agm
- ×Halimiocistus 'Ingwersenii' agm
- ×Halimiocistus sahucii agm

=== Gallery ===
Various hybrids and cultivars

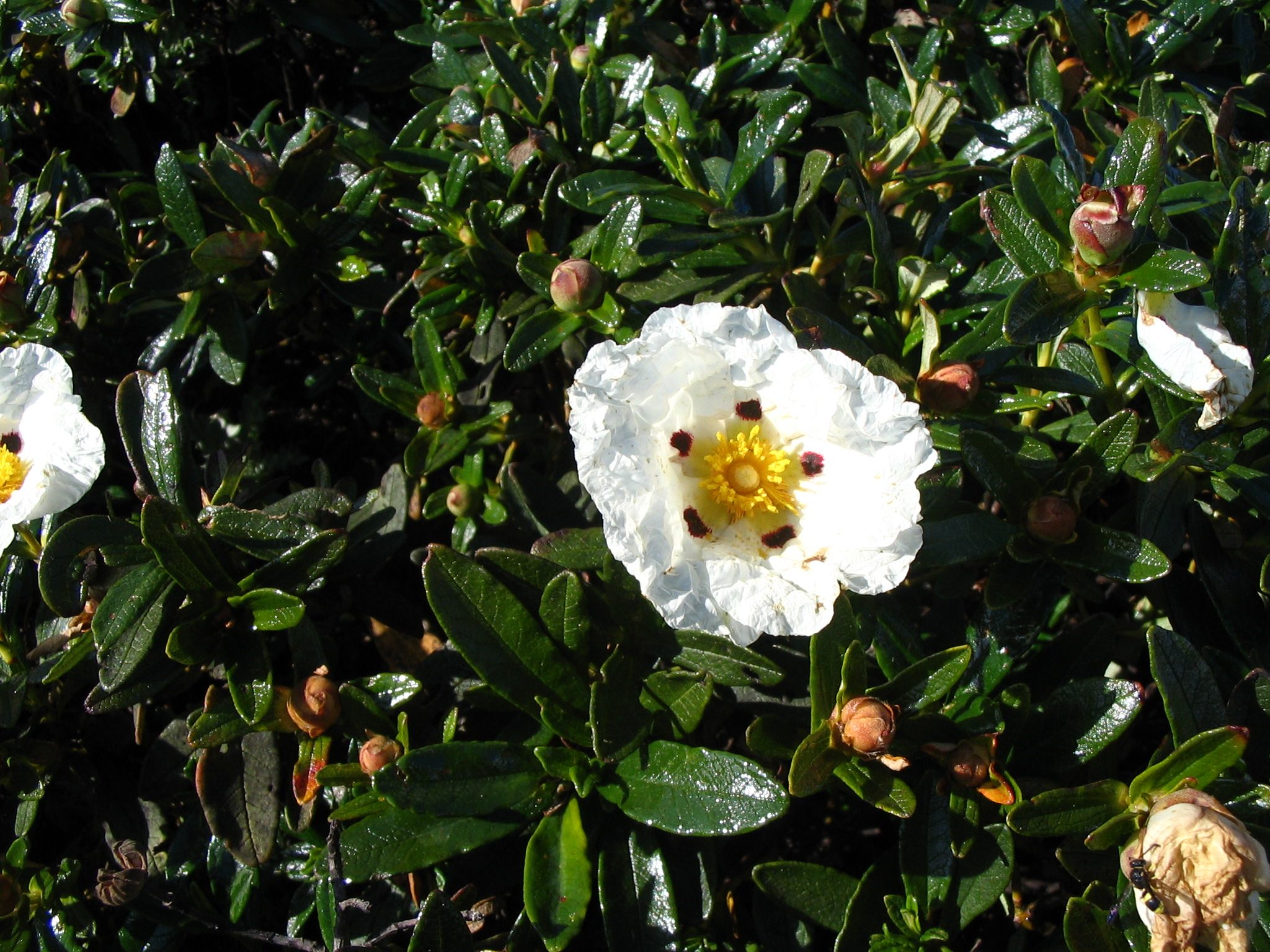
Cistus × dansereaui

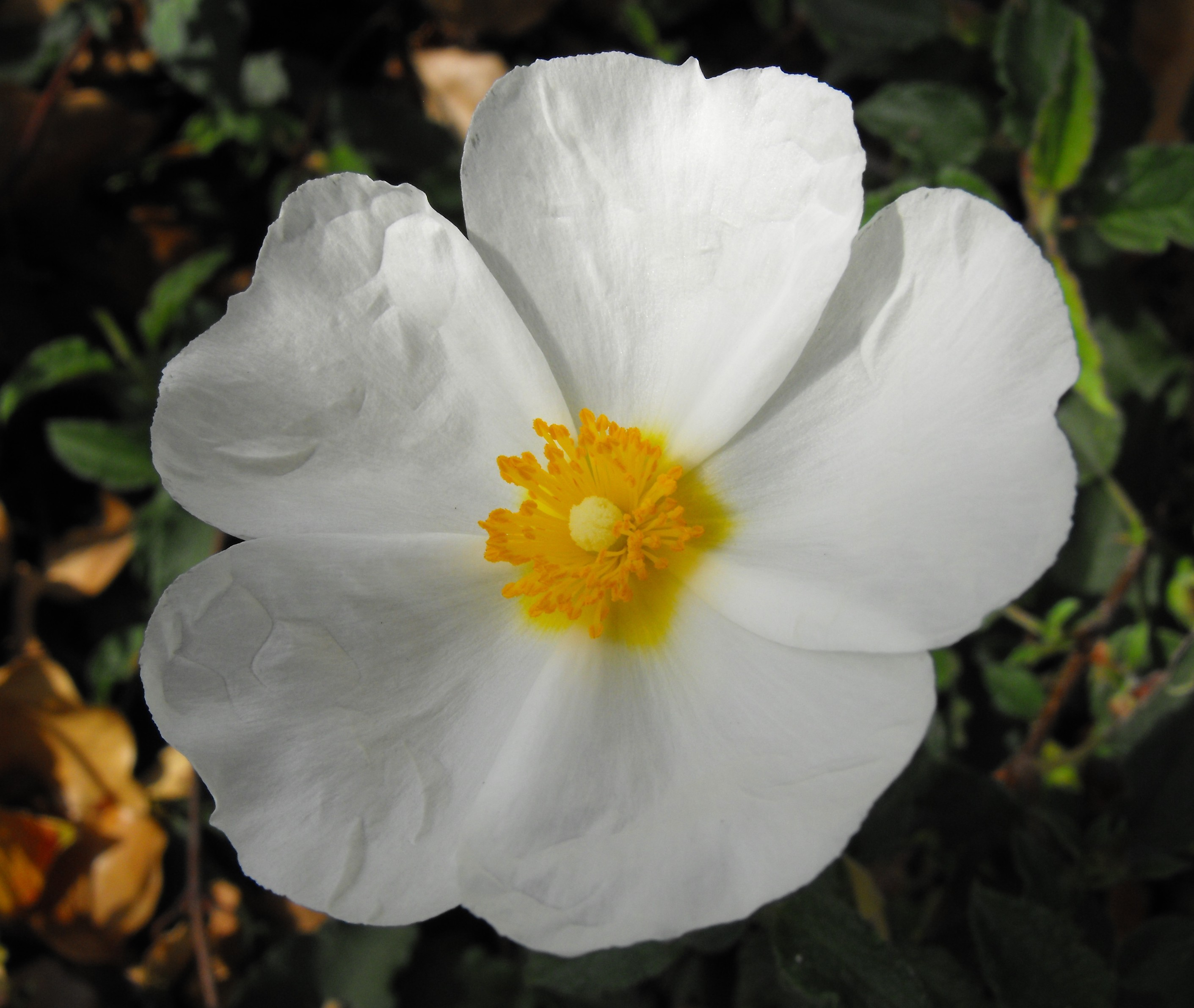
Cistus × hybridus

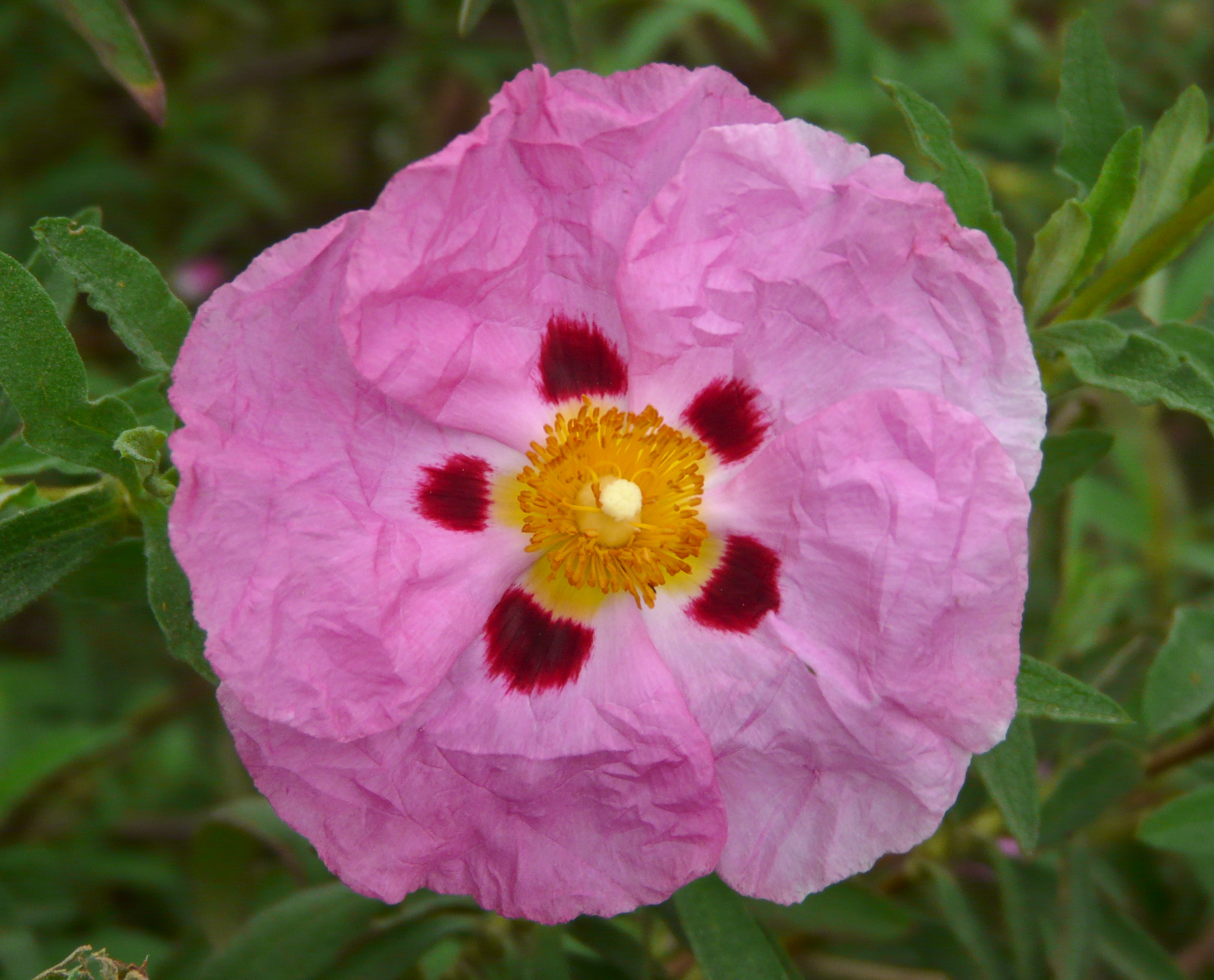
Cistus × purpureus

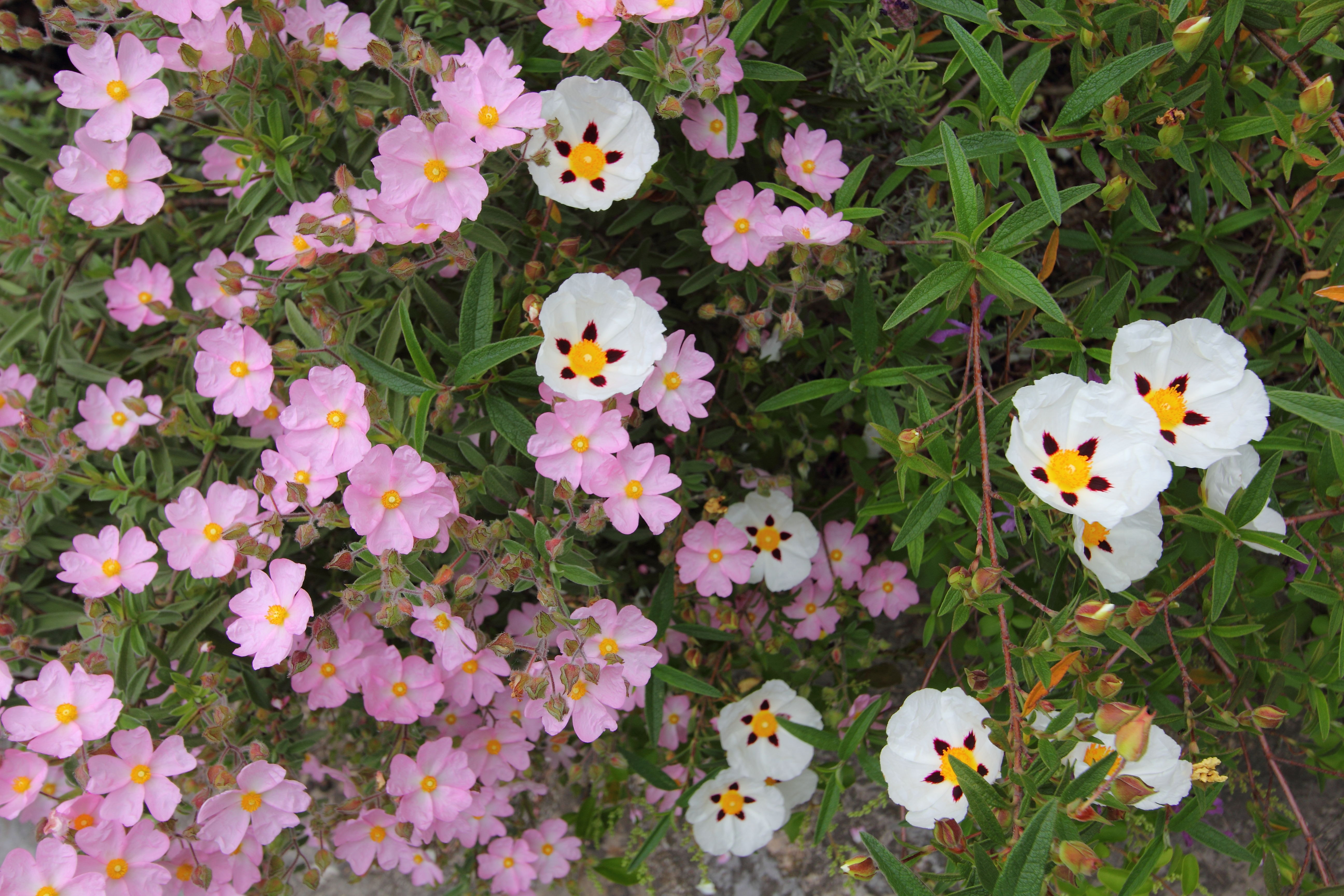
Cistus × skanbergii (pale pink) and Cistus × verguinii (white and spotted)

== Bibliography ==
- Demoly, J.-P. (2006). "Notes taxonomiques, chorologiques et nouveautes nomenclaturales pour le genre Cistus L. elargi, incluant Halimium (Dunal) Spach (Cistaceae)". Acta Botanica Gallica. 153 (3): 309–323. Proposes merging Cistus and Halimium.
- Demoly, J.-P. & Montserrat, P. (1993). "Cistus" (PDF). In Castroviejo, S.; Aedo, C.; Cirujano, S.; Lainz, M.; Montserrat, P.; Morales, R.; Munoz Garmendia, F.; Navarro, C.; Paiva, J.; Soriano, C. & Fernandez Arias, M.I. (eds.). Flora Iberica: Plantas vasculares de la Península Ibérica e Islas Baleares. Vol. 3. Madrid: Real Jardín Botánico, CSIC. pp. 319–337. ISBN 978-84-00-07375-6.
- Ellul, P.; Boscaiu, M.; Vicente, O.; Moreno, V. & Rossello, J.A. (2002). "Intra- and Interspecific Variation in DNA Content in Cistus (Cistaceae)". Annals of Botany. 90 (3): 345–351. doi:10.1093/aob/mcf194. PMC 4240394. PMID 12234146.
- Page, R.G. (n.d.) [2002 onwards]. "The Cistus & Halimium Website".
- Sweet, Robert (1825–1830). Cistineae: the natural order of Cistus or Rock-rose. London: James Ridgeway.
- Warburg, E.F. (1968). "Cistus". In Tutin, T.G.; Heywood, V.H.; Burges, N.A.; Valentine, D.H.; Walters, S.M. & Webb, D.A. (eds.). Flora Europaea, Volume 2: Rosaceae to Umbelliferae. Cambridge University Press. pp. 282–284. ISBN 978-0-521-06662-4.
