= Cistus pouzolzii =

Scientific classification
- Kingdom: Plantae
- Clade: Embryophytes
- Clade: Tracheophytes
- Clade: Spermatophytes
- Clade: Angiosperms
- Clade: Eudicots
- Clade: Rosids
- Order: Malvales
- Family: Cistaceae
- Genus: Cistus
- Species: C. pouzolzii

Binomial name
- Cistus pouzolzii Delile ex Gren. & Godr.

Species of flowering plant

Cistus pouzolzii is a shrubby species of flowering plant in the family Cistaceae.

== Phylogeny ==
Cistus pouzolzii belongs to the white and whitish pink flowered clade of Cistus species.

Species-level cladogram of Cistus species

- - Halimium spp.
  - - Halimium spp.
    - - PPC
        - Cistus crispus
        - - - Cistus heterophyllus
            - - Cistus albidus
              - Cistus creticus
          - - Cistus asper
            - Cistus chinamadensis
            - Cistus horrens
            - Cistus ocreatus
            - Cistus osbeckiifolius
            - Cistus palmensis
            - Cistus symphytifolius
  - WWPC
    - - Cistus clusii
      - Cistus munbyi
    - - Cistus inflatus
      - Cistus ladanifer
      - Cistus laurifolius
      - Cistus libanotis
      - Cistus monspeliensis
      - Cistus parviflorus
      - Cistus populifolius
      - Cistus pouzolzii
      - Cistus salviifolius
      - Cistus sintenisii

Species-level cladogram of Cistus species, based on plastid and nuclear DNA sequences
