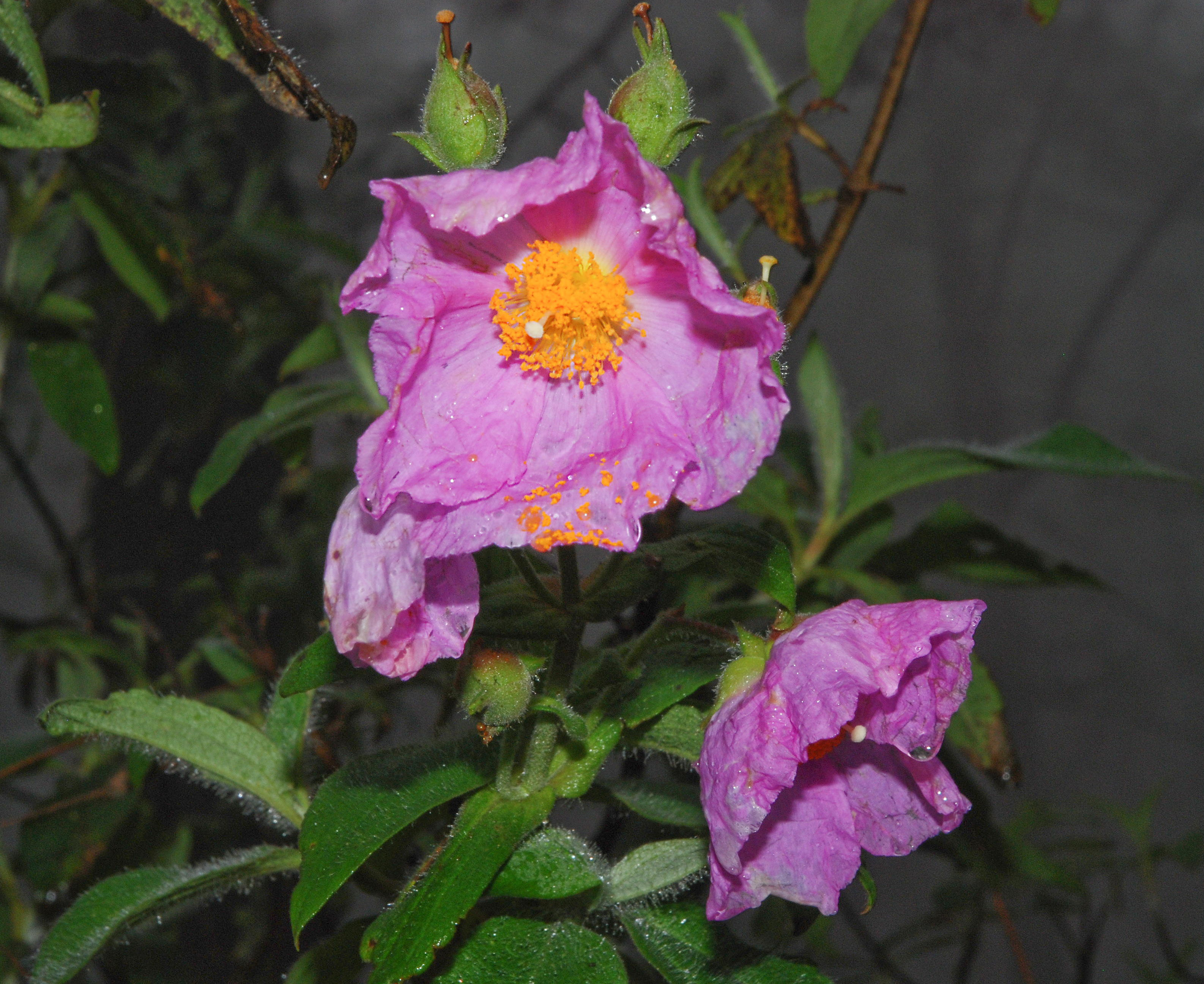

Scientific classification
- Kingdom: Plantae
- Clade: Embryophytes
- Clade: Tracheophytes
- Clade: Spermatophytes
- Clade: Angiosperms
- Clade: Eudicots
- Clade: Rosids
- Order: Malvales
- Family: Cistaceae
- Genus: Cistus
- Species: C. symphytifolius

Binomial name
- Cistus symphytifolius Lam.

Synonyms
- Cistus vaginatus Dryand.

= Cistus symphytifolius =

Species of flowering plant

Cistus symphytifolius is a shrubby species of flowering plant in the family Cistaceae. It is endemic to the Canary Islands".

== Phylogeny ==
Cistus symphytifolius belongs to the clade of species with purple and pink flowers (the "purple pink clade" or PPC), along with some other Canary Island endemics (Cistus asper, Cistus chinamadensis, Cistus horrens, and Cistus ocreatus).

Species-level cladogram of Cistus species

- - Halimium spp.
  - - Halimium spp.
    - - PPC
        - Cistus crispus
        - - - Cistus heterophyllus
            - - Cistus albidus
              - Cistus creticus
          - - Cistus asper
            - Cistus chinamadensis
            - Cistus horrens
            - Cistus ocreatus
            - Cistus osbeckiifolius
            - Cistus palmensis
            - Cistus symphytifolius
  - WWPC
    - - Cistus clusii
      - Cistus munbyi
    - - Cistus inflatus
      - Cistus ladanifer
      - Cistus laurifolius
      - Cistus libanotis
      - Cistus monspeliensis
      - Cistus parviflorus
      - Cistus populifolius
      - Cistus pouzolzii
      - Cistus salviifolius
      - Cistus sintenisii

Species-level cladogram of Cistus species, based on plastid and nuclear DNA sequences
