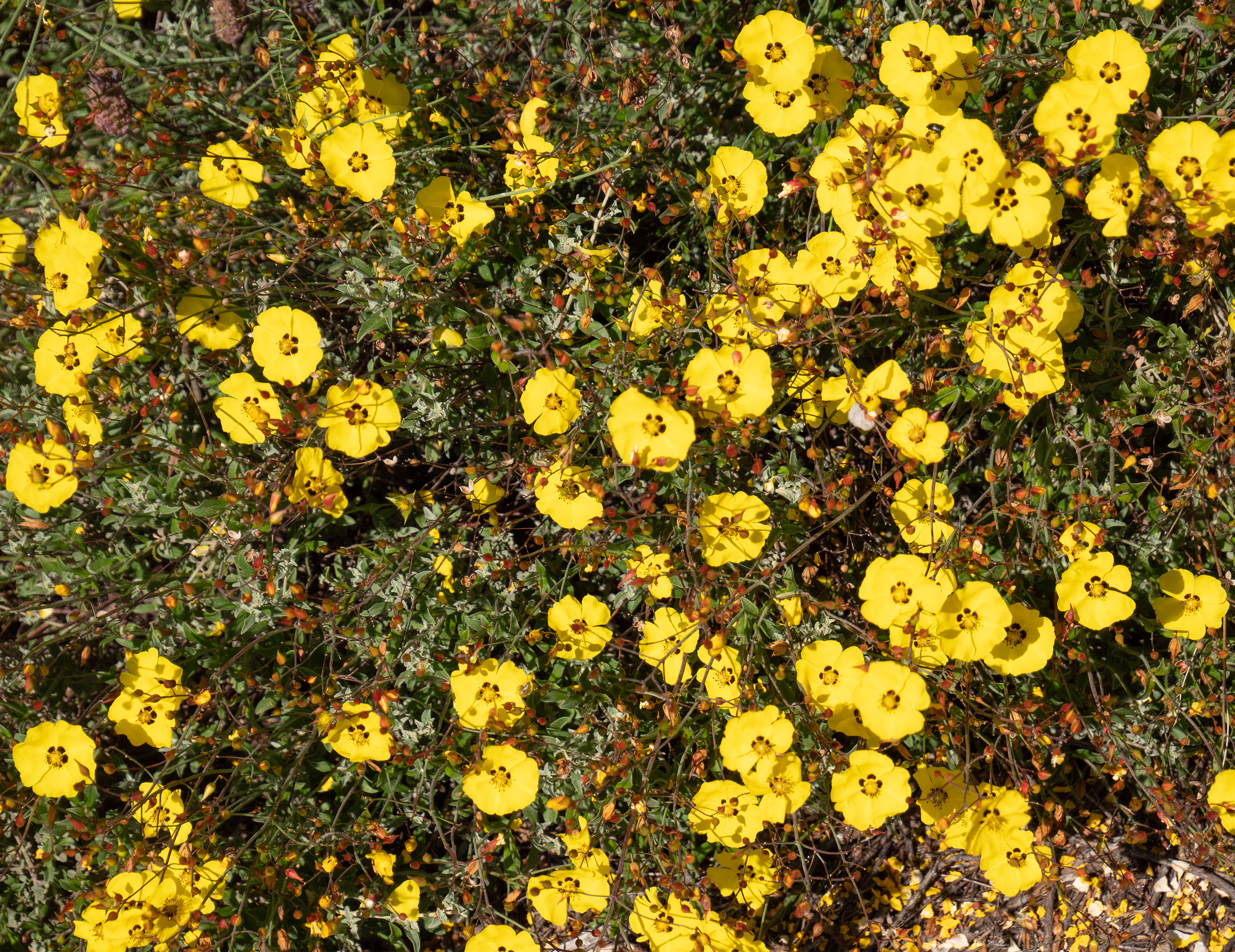

Scientific classification
- Kingdom: Plantae
- Clade: Embryophytes
- Clade: Tracheophytes
- Clade: Spermatophytes
- Clade: Angiosperms
- Clade: Eudicots
- Clade: Rosids
- Order: Malvales
- Family: Cistaceae
- Genus: Cistus
- Species: C. ocymoides

Binomial name
- Cistus ocymoides Lam. (1786)

Synonyms
- Cistus algarvensis Sims (1803); Cistus elongatus Vahl (1790); Cistus involucratus Lam. (1786); Cistus sampsucifolius Cav. (1791); Halimium heterophyllum Spach (1836); Halimium ocymoides (Lam.) Willk. (1878); Helianthemum algarvense (Sims) Dunal (1824); Helianthemum heterophyllum Steud. (1840); Helianthemum microphyllum Sweet (1829); Helianthemum ocimifolium Pourr. ex Nyman (1878); Helianthemum ocymoides (Lam.) Pers. (1806); Helianthemum rugosum Sweet (1828), nom. illeg.; Stegitris algarviensis Raf. (1838)

= Cistus ocymoides =

Species of flowering plant

Cistus ocymoides (syn. Halimium ocymoides), the basil-leaved rock rose, is a species of flowering plant in the family Cistaceae, native to Portugal and Spain in the Iberian Peninsula, and northern Morocco in Northwest Africa. It is an erect evergreen shrub growing to 60 cm (24 in) tall by 100 cm (3 ft) wide, with woolly grey-green leaves and bright yellow flowers in spring. The flowers may have a dark brown blotch at the base of each petal.

In cultivation this plant requires a sandy soil and full sun.
