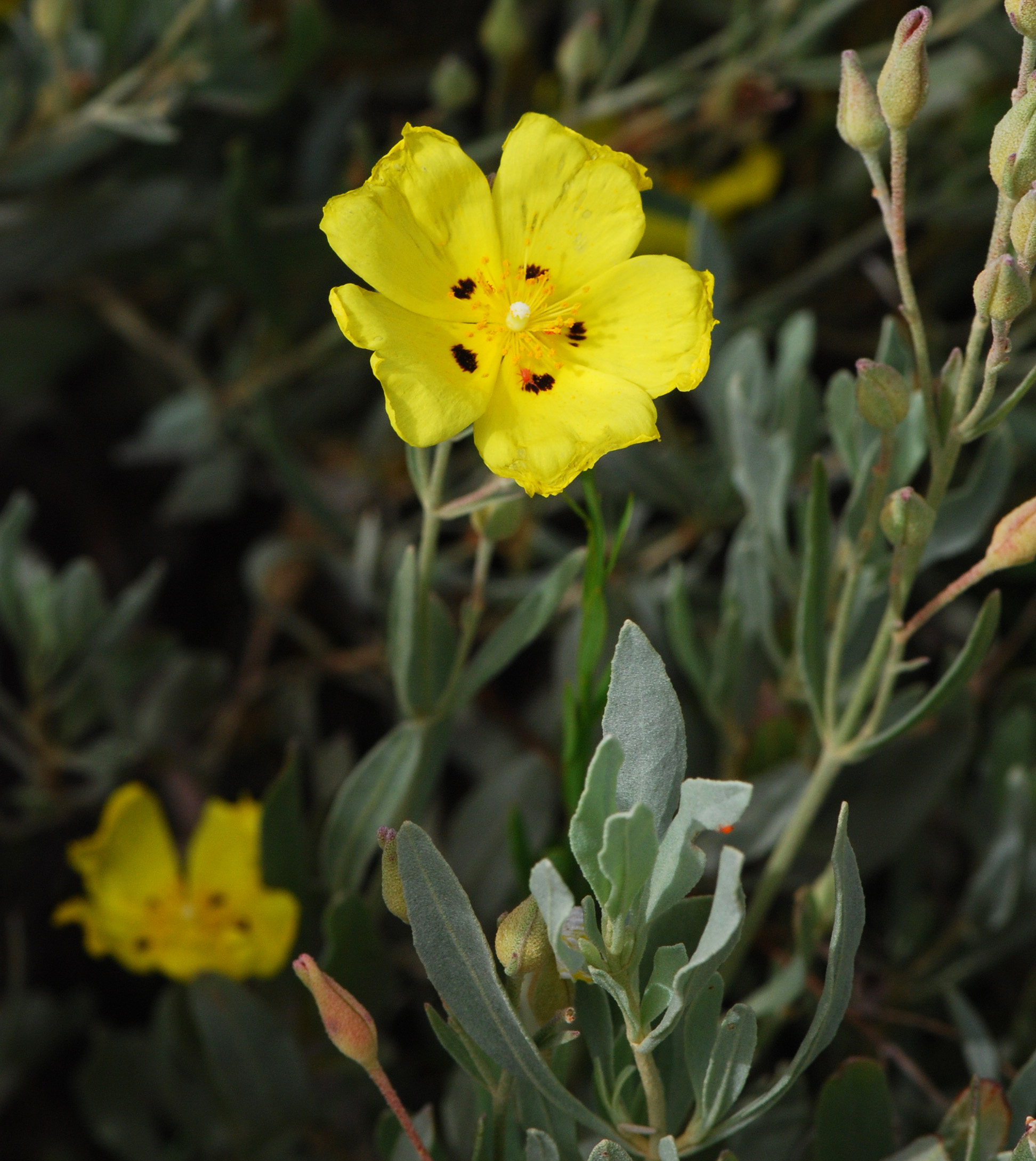

Scientific classification
- Kingdom: Plantae
- Clade: Embryophytes
- Clade: Tracheophytes
- Clade: Spermatophytes
- Clade: Angiosperms
- Clade: Eudicots
- Clade: Rosids
- Order: Malvales
- Family: Cistaceae
- Genus: Cistus
- Species: C. halimifolius

Binomial name
- Cistus halimifolius L. (1753)

Synonyms
- Cistus lepidotus Amo (1873); Cistus multiflorus (Salzm. ex Dunal) Amo (1873); Halimium antiatlanticum Maire & Wilczek (1935); Halimium halimifolium (L.) Willk. (1878); Helianthemum halimifolium (L.) Pers. (1806); Strobon halimifolium (L.) Raf. (1838)

= Cistus halimifolius =

Species of flowering plant

Cistus halimifolius is a species of flowering plant in the family Cistaceae. it is a subshrub or shrub native to the western and central Mediterranean Basin, Including Portugal, mainland Spain and the Balearic Islands, Corsica, Sardinia, the Italian peninsula, Morocco, Algeria, and Tunisia.
