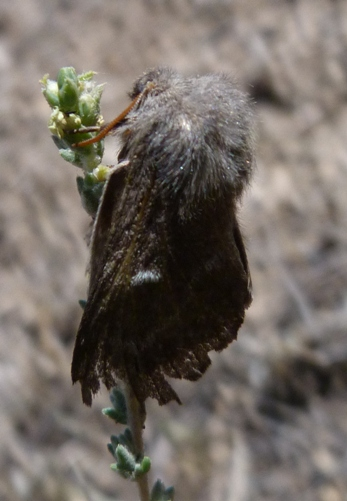

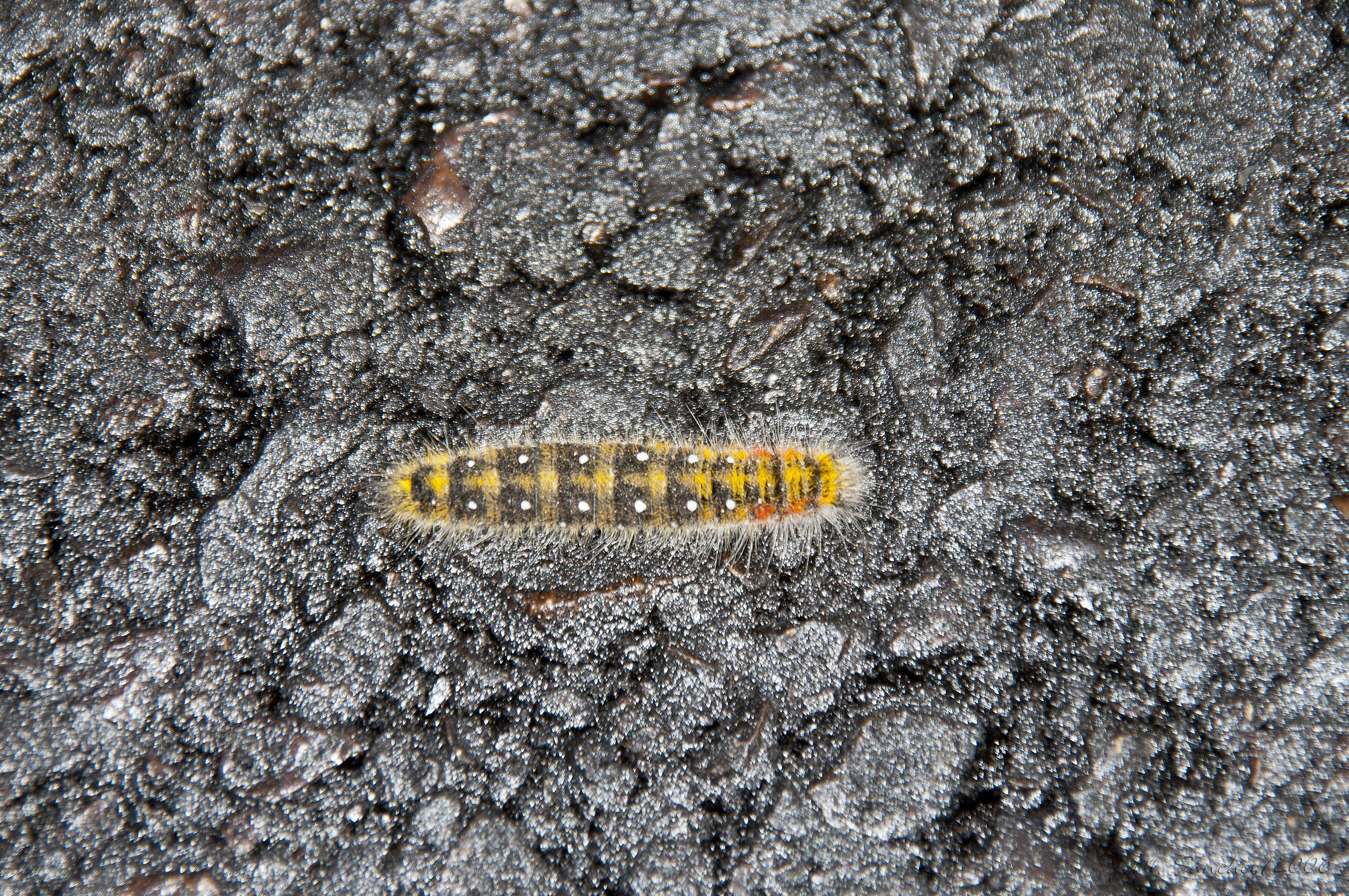

Scientific classification
- Kingdom: Animalia
- Phylum: Arthropoda
- Clade: Pancrustacea
- Class: Insecta
- Order: Lepidoptera
- Family: Lasiocampidae
- Subfamily: Lasiocampinae
- Genus: Psilogaster; Reichenbach, 1817
- Species: P. loti

Binomial name
- Psilogaster loti (Ochsenheimer, 1810)

Synonyms
- Genus: Diplura Rambur, 1866; Dipluriella Strand, 1910; Species: Gastropacha loti Ochsenheimer, 1810; Dipluriella loti; Psilogaster brunnea Oberthür, 1900; Psilogaster vernetensis Oberthür, 1916; Psilogaster homochroa Zerny, 1927; Psilogaster claussi Dionisio, 1977

= Psilogaster =

Psilogaster loti

Genus of moths

Psilogaster is a monotypic genus of moths in the family Lasiocampidae, first described by Reichenbach in 1817. Its only species, Psilogaster loti, described by Ferdinand Ochsenheimer in 1810, is found in south-western Europe and North Africa.

The wingspan is 27–35 mm.

The larvae feed on Cistus salvifolius, Cistus albidus, Cistus populifolius, Cistus ladanifer, Cistus laurifolius, Cistus clusii and possibly Rosmarinus officinalis and Helianthemum.

== Subspecies ==
- Psilogaster loti loti
- Psilogaster loti algeriensis Baker, 1885 (Morocco to Libya)
- Psilogaster loti simulatrix Chrétien, 1910 (Tunisia, Libya)
