= Parafomoria cistivora =

- Leaf mines on Cistus laurifolius

Scientific classification
- Kingdom: Animalia
- Phylum: Arthropoda
- Clade: Pancrustacea
- Class: Insecta
- Order: Lepidoptera
- Family: Nepticulidae
- Genus: Parafomoria
- Species: P. cistivora

Binomial name
- Parafomoria cistivora (Peyerimhoff, 1871)

Synonyms
- Nepticula cistivora Peyerimhoff, 1871; Stigmella cistivora

Species of moth

Parafomoria cistivora is a species of moth in the family Nepticulidae. It is found in the western Mediterranean region.

The length of the forewings is 2.3-2.6 mm for males and 2.1-2.6 mm for females. Adults are on wing from the end of August to the end of October. There is probably one generation per year.

The larvae feed on Cistus ladanifer, Cistus laurifolius, Cistus monspeliensis, Cistus populifolius and Cistus salviifolius. They mine the leaves of their host plant.
