= Neotelphusa huemeri =

Scientific classification
- Kingdom: Animalia
- Phylum: Arthropoda
- Clade: Pancrustacea
- Class: Insecta
- Order: Lepidoptera
- Family: Gelechiidae
- Genus: Neotelphusa
- Species: N. huemeri

Binomial name
- Neotelphusa huemeri (Nel, 1998)

Synonyms
- Teleiodes huemeri Nel, 1998; Teleiodes pseudocisti Leraut, 1997 (nom. nud.)

Species of moth

Neotelphusa huemeri is a moth of the family Gelechiidae. It is found in Portugal, Spain, southern France and on Corsica and Sardinia.

The larvae feed on Cistus salvifolius, Cistus laurifolius, Cistus monspeliensis and Cistus psilosepalus.
