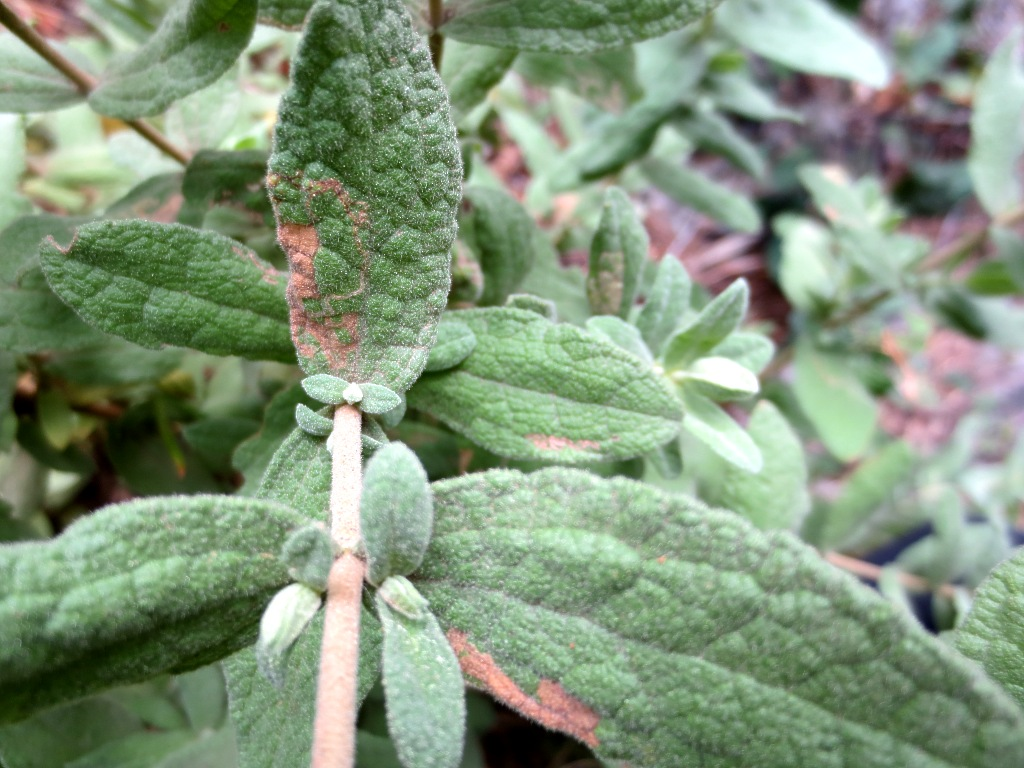

Scientific classification
- Kingdom: Animalia
- Phylum: Arthropoda
- Clade: Pancrustacea
- Class: Insecta
- Order: Lepidoptera
- Family: Nepticulidae
- Genus: Parafomoria
- Species: P. pseudocistivora

Binomial name
- Parafomoria pseudocistivora van Nieukerken 1983

= Parafomoria pseudocistivora =

Species of moth

Parafomoria pseudocistivora is a moth of the family Nepticulidae. It is probably found in the whole Mediterranean region.

The length of the forewings is 2.1-2.6 mm for males and 2.1-2.6 mm for females. Adults are on wing from September to October. There is probably one generation per year.

The larvae feed on Cistus albidus, Cistus crispus, Cistus incanus creticus and Cistus salviifolius. They mine the leaves of their host plant.
