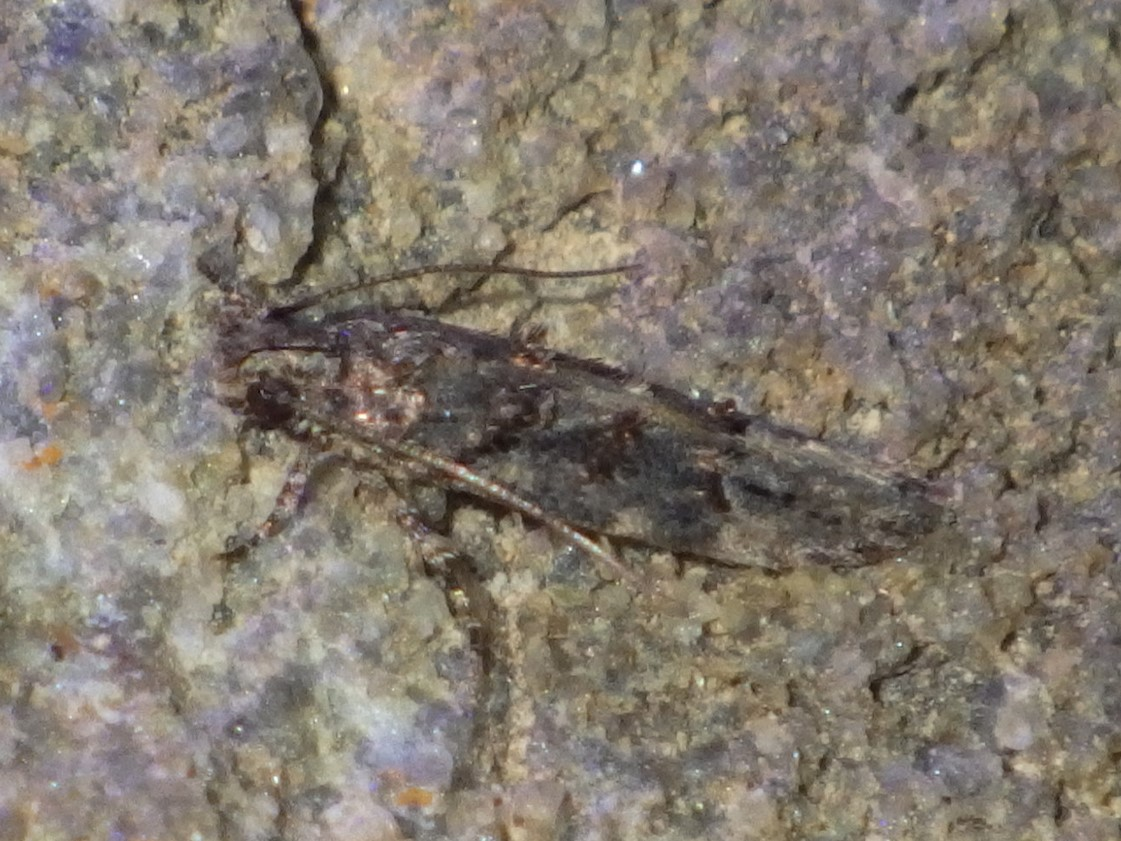

Scientific classification
- Kingdom: Animalia
- Phylum: Arthropoda
- Clade: Pancrustacea
- Class: Insecta
- Order: Lepidoptera
- Family: Gelechiidae
- Genus: Neotelphusa
- Species: N. cisti

Binomial name
- Neotelphusa cisti (Stainton, 1869)

Synonyms
- Gelechia cisti Stainton, 1869

= Neotelphusa cisti =

Species of moth

Neotelphusa cisti is a species of moth in the family Gelechiidae. It is found on the Canary Islands and in North Africa, Turkey, Corsica, Sardinia, Cyprus, France, Croatia, Italy, Bulgaria, Greece and Portugal.

== Description ==
The forewings are dark slaty grey, with three tufts of tawny grey scales near the inner margin, the first (and largest) before the middle, the second in the middle, the third beyond the middle and with an oblique black streak that arises on the costa near the base and terminates at the first tuft, and a fainter oblique dark streak proceeds from near the middle of the costa. On the costa, beyond the middle, is a small blackish spot, below which are two black spots at the end of the discoidal cell, edged externally with pale grey. A little beyond them a slender black streak proceeds to the apex of the wing, the apex of the costa and hinder margin are faintly mottled with darker grey. The hindwings are pale grey, darker towards the hindmargin. The larvae are pale yellowish green with a yellowish brown head.

== Behaviour and ecology ==
The larvae on Cistus salvifolius, Cistus albidus, Cistus monspeliensis and Halimium alyssoides.
