= Parafomoria ladaniphila =

Scientific classification
- Kingdom: Animalia
- Phylum: Arthropoda
- Class: Insecta
- Order: Lepidoptera
- Family: Nepticulidae
- Genus: Parafomoria
- Species: P. ladaniphila

Binomial name
- Parafomoria ladaniphila (Mendes, 1910)

Synonyms
- Nepticula ladaniphila Mendes, 1910; Stigmella ladaniphila; Ectoedemia ladaniphila

Species of moth

Parafomoria ladaniphila is a moth of the family Nepticulidae. It is found in Portugal and southern Spain.

The length of the forewings is 1.7-1.85 mm for males and 1.7-1.8 mm for females. Adults are on wing from June to July.

The larvae feed on Cistus ladanifer. They mine the leaves of their host plant.
