= Parafomoria liguricella =

Scientific classification
- Kingdom: Animalia
- Phylum: Arthropoda
- Class: Insecta
- Order: Lepidoptera
- Family: Nepticulidae
- Genus: Parafomoria
- Species: P. liguricella

Binomial name
- Parafomoria liguricella (Klimesch, 1946) van Nieukerken, 1983

Synonyms
- Stigmella liguricella Klimesch, 1946

Species of moth

Parafomoria liguricella is a moth of the family Nepticulidae. It is found in the Italian Riviera and the Spanish Mediterranean coast. It is probably also present in France, Portugal and North Africa.

The length of the forewings is 1.7–1.85 mm for males and 1.3–2.2 mm for females. Adults are on wing from May to June. There is probably one generation per year.

The larvae feed on Cistus albidus. They mine the leaves of their host plant.
