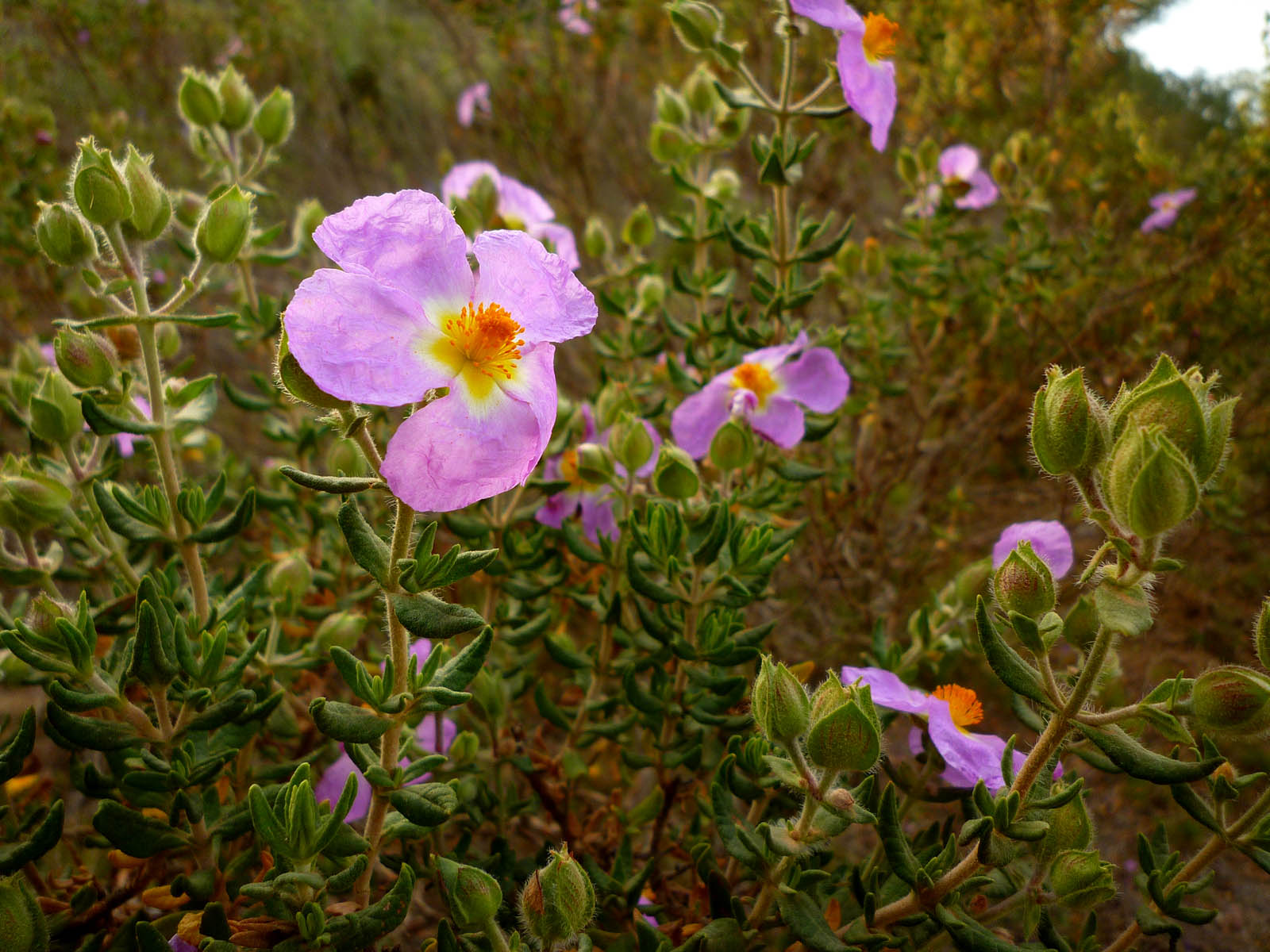
- Cistus heterophyllus subsp. carthaginensis, Sierra minera de Cartagena, Spain

Scientific classification
- Kingdom: Plantae
- Clade: Embryophytes
- Clade: Tracheophytes
- Clade: Spermatophytes
- Clade: Angiosperms
- Clade: Eudicots
- Clade: Rosids
- Order: Malvales
- Family: Cistaceae
- Genus: Cistus
- Species: C. heterophyllus

Binomial name
- Cistus heterophyllus Desf.

= Cistus heterophyllus =

Species of flowering plant

Cistus heterophyllus is a shrubby species of flowering plant in the family Cistaceae.

== Description ==
Cistus heterophyllus grows up to 1 m (3 ft) tall, forming an erect, much-branched shrub. Its leaves are elliptical to lanceolate in shape, usually 5–20 mm (0.2–0.8 in) long, the upper surfaces being dark green with stellate and simple hairs, and the lower surfaces whitish with a coating of short hairs. The leaf margins are slightly turned under (revolute) and the veins are much more obvious on the underside. The leaves are of two kinds: the upper are without stalks (petioles), the lower have short stalks. The flowers are arranged in cymes of one to five individual flowers, each with five purplish-pink petals, usually with a yellow spot at the base. Like the leaves, the five sepals have stellate hairs, plus some longer simple hairs. The fruit capsule is about 9 mm (0.35 in) high containing angular brownish seeds.

The two described subspecies differ in the distribution of hairs. In C. h. subsp. heterophyllus, the young stems have both many stellate hairs and many longer simple hairs, and the leaves have scattered long simple hairs. In C. h. subsp. carthaginensis, the young stems and leaves have fewer simple hairs. The outer two sepals of C. h. subsp. heterophyllus average about 10 mm (0.39 in) long by 9 mm (0.35 in) wide, whereas those of C. h. subsp. carthaginensis are smaller, averaging about 8.5 mm (0.33 in) long by 6 mm (0.24 in) wide. The petals of C. h. subsp. heterophyllus are about 20–30 mm (0.8–1.2 in) long by 20–25 mm (0.8–1.0 in) wide, making the flower diameter typically 40–50 mm (1.6–2.0 in). Although there is considerable variation and the size ranges overlap, the petals of C. h. subsp. carthaginensis may be as small as 12 mm (0.47 in) long and 10 mm (0.39 in) wide, making the flower diameter typically 30–40 mm (1.2–1.6 in).

== Taxonomy and phylogeny ==
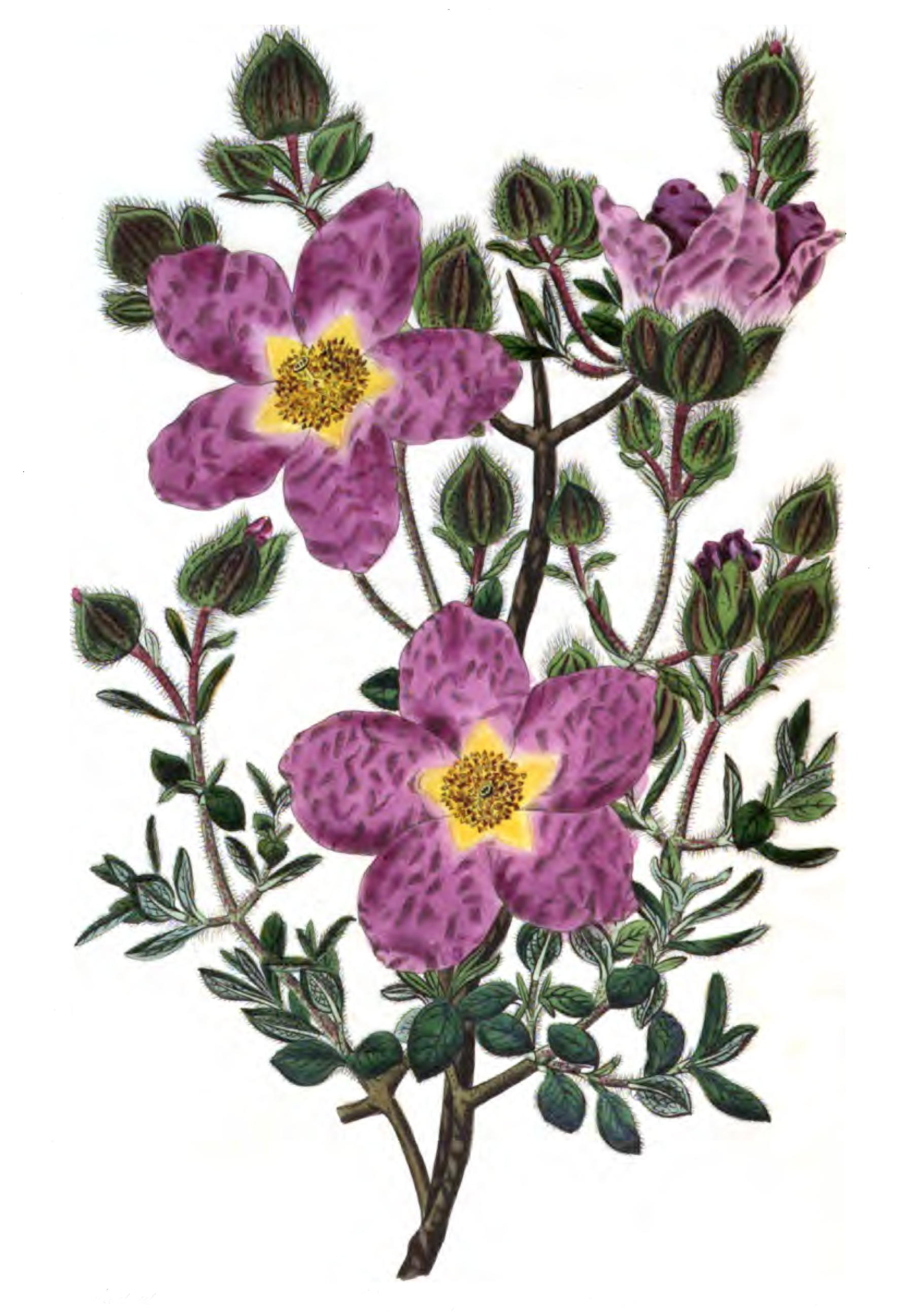
Cistus heterophyllus from Sweet's Cystineae; probably subsp. heterophyllus as said to be "from Algeria"

Cistus heterophyllus was first described by René Louiche Desfontaines in 1798. The specific epithet heterophyllus means "with leaves of different shapes", the upper being unstalked, the lower shortly stalked.

Two subspecies are accepted:

- Cistus heterophyllus subsp. carthaginensis (Pau) M.B.Crespo & Mateo – mainland Spain
- Cistus heterophyllus subsp. heterophyllus – north Africa

The two subspecies have been artificially crossed forming a hybrid subspecies called C. h. nothosubsp. marzoi.

A 2011 molecular phylogenetic study placed C. heterophyllus in the purple and pink flowered clade (PPC) of Cistus species, in a subclade with C. albidus and C. creticus.

Species-level cladogram of Cistus species

- - Halimium spp.
  - - Halimium spp.
    - - PPC
        - Cistus crispus
        - - - Cistus heterophyllus
            - - Cistus albidus
              - Cistus creticus
          - - Cistus asper
            - Cistus chinamadensis
            - Cistus horrens
            - Cistus ocreatus
            - Cistus osbeckiifolius
            - Cistus palmensis
            - Cistus symphytifolius
  - WWPC
    - - Cistus clusii
      - Cistus munbyi
    - - Cistus inflatus
      - Cistus ladanifer
      - Cistus laurifolius
      - Cistus libanotis
      - Cistus monspeliensis
      - Cistus parviflorus
      - Cistus populifolius
      - Cistus pouzolzii
      - Cistus salviifolius
      - Cistus sintenisii

Species-level cladogram of Cistus species, based on plastid and nuclear DNA sequences

== Distribution ==
Cistus heterophyllus has a disjoint distribution. C. h. subsp. heterophyllus is native to western North Africa, along the coastal Mediterranean region from the Spanish island of Peñón de Alhucemas and Targuist in Morocco to Algiers. C. h. subsp. carthaginensis is found only in two locations in mainland Spain: near La Pobla de Vallbona in Valencia and in the Calblanque Regional Park in Murcia.

== Conservation ==
Cistus heterophyllus subsp. carthaginensis is listed as critically endangered (CR) in the IUCN Red List. Fewer than 30 individuals were known in 2011 (only one at the Valencian site) and some appear to be hybrids with Cistus albidus. The subspecies is threatened by fires and human disturbance. Seeds have been stored in seedbanks, and attempts are being made to increase plants in cultivation, both from seed and in vitro.
