= Neotelphusa ochrophthalma =

Scientific classification
- Kingdom: Animalia
- Phylum: Arthropoda
- Class: Insecta
- Order: Lepidoptera
- Family: Gelechiidae
- Genus: Neotelphusa
- Species: N. ochrophthalma

Binomial name
- Neotelphusa ochrophthalma (Meyrick, 1927)

Synonyms
- Telphusa ochrophthalma Meyrick, 1927

Species of moth

Neotelphusa ochrophthalma is a moth of the family Gelechiidae. It is found in South Africa and Namibia.

The wingspan is about 10 mm. The forewings are pale grey suffusedly irrorated white and with a slender blackish costal streak from the base to two-thirds, interrupted by white marks into three equal portions. There is a pale ochreous-yellow spot of raised scales beneath the costa before the middle, two others transversely placed in the disc at two-thirds, and a dot in the disc between these. There are also some scattered black specks, especially on the posterior half and the apical area is darker grey. The hindwings are pale grey with white reflections.
