= Neotelphusa obliquifascia =

Scientific classification
- Domain: Eukaryota
- Kingdom: Animalia
- Phylum: Arthropoda
- Class: Insecta
- Order: Lepidoptera
- Family: Gelechiidae
- Genus: Neotelphusa
- Species: N. obliquifascia

Binomial name
- Neotelphusa obliquifascia Janse, 1960

Species of moth

Neotelphusa obliquifascia is a moth of the family Gelechiidae. It is found in Mozambique.
