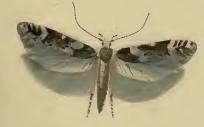

Scientific classification
- Kingdom: Animalia
- Phylum: Arthropoda
- Clade: Pancrustacea
- Class: Insecta
- Order: Lepidoptera
- Family: Gelechiidae
- Genus: Neotelphusa
- Species: N. sequax

Binomial name
- Neotelphusa sequax (Haworth, 1828)

Synonyms
- Recurvaria sequax Haworth, 1828; Teleiodes sequax; Lita apicistrigella Duponchel, [1843]; Gelechia sequacella Doubleday, 1859; Gelechia sequaxella Bruand, 1859

= Neotelphusa sequax =

Species of moth

Neotelphusa sequax (crepuscular rock-rose moth) is a moth of the family Gelechiidae. It is found in most of Europe and has also been recorded from North America.

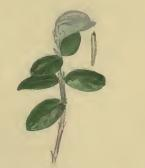
A shoot of Helianthemum vulgare spun together by larva

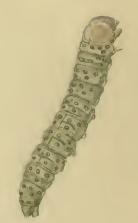
Larva

The wingspan is 11–14 mm. Adults are on wing in July.

The larvae feed on Helianthemum nummularium and Helianthemum oelandicum.
