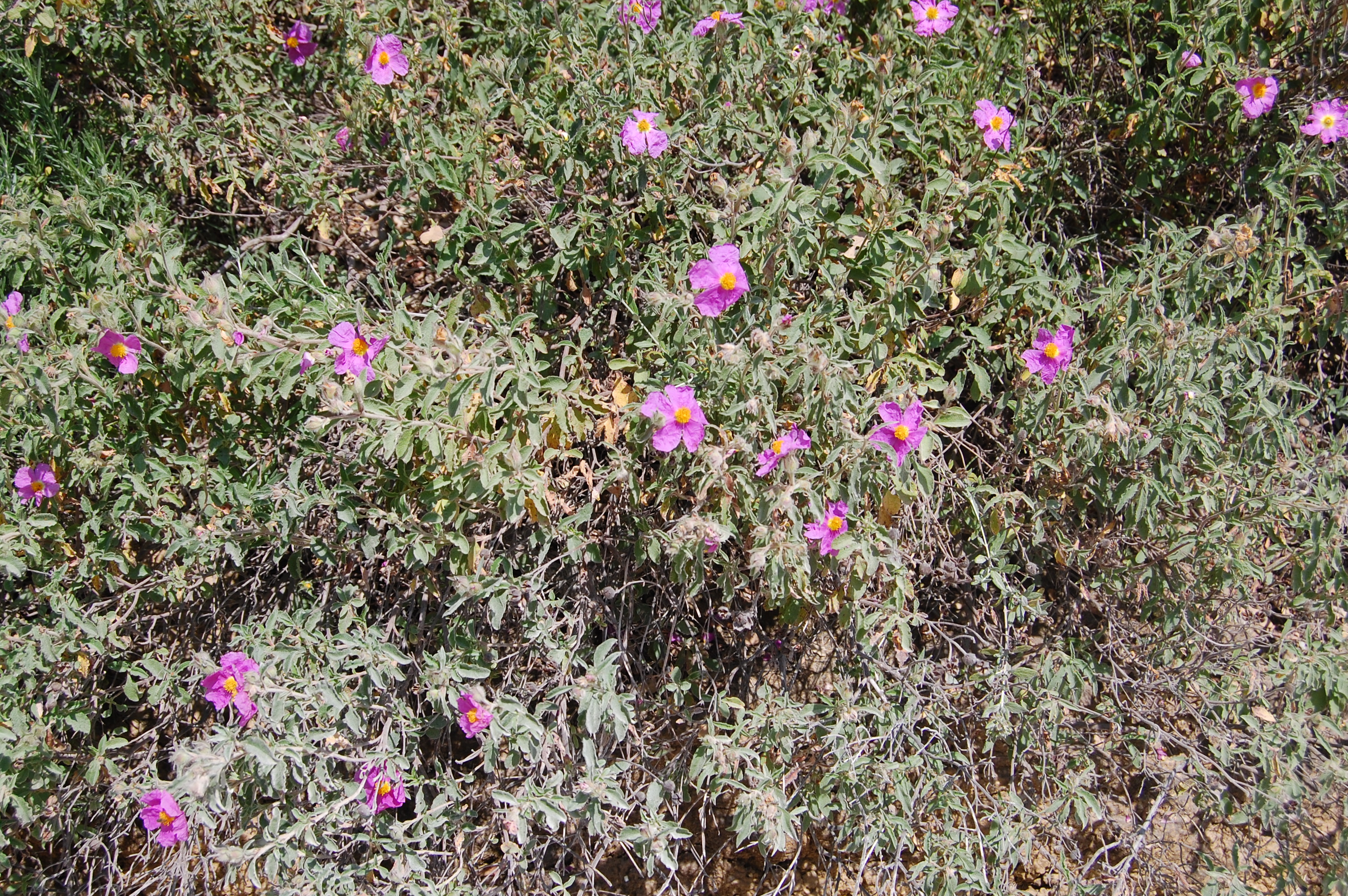

Scientific classification
- Kingdom: Plantae
- Clade: Tracheophytes
- Clade: Angiosperms
- Clade: Eudicots
- Clade: Rosids
- Order: Malvales
- Family: Cistaceae
- Genus: Cistus
- Species: C. × incanus

Binomial name
- Cistus × incanus L.

Synonyms
- See § Taxonomy. C. incanus auct., non L. = Cistus creticus

= Cistus × incanus =

Nothospecies of flowering plant

Cistus × incanus L. is a hybrid between Cistus albidus and Cistus crispus. The name "Cistus incanus" (synonym C. villosus) has been used by other authors in a different sense, for Cistus creticus (at least in part). The English name hoary rock-rose may refer to this species, among others.

== Description ==
Because of confusion between the original species named by Linnaeus in 1753 and the way in which the name was used by later authors (see § Taxonomy), plants described under this name may actually belong to different species. C. × incanus is a shrubby plant, to about 1 m (3 ft) tall, with grey-green leaves and pink to purple flowers.

== Taxonomy ==
The name Cistus incanus was first used by Carl Linnaeus in 1753 in Species Plantarum. Confusion exists among this name and two later names published by Linnaeus, Cistus creticus in 1762 and Cistus villosus in 1764. There is general agreement that C. villosus, at least as used by later authors, is not a distinct species. Two treatments are then found.

In the first, generally older, treatment, C. incanus is accepted, with C. villosus being a synonym. C. creticus is treated as C. incanus subsp. creticus.

According to Demoly (1996), Linnaeus's Cistus incanus was recognized to be a hybrid as early as 1904. The second treatment (followed here) is based on this recognition. C. creticus is accepted, with C. villosus as a synonym. C. × incanus L. is treated as the hybrid C. albidus × C. crispus. As used by previous authors, but not Linnaeus, the name "C. incanus" is taken to refer to Cistus creticus, particularly C. creticus subsp. eriocephalus. Two formerly recognised subspecies of C. incanus are regarded as subspecies of Cistus creticus:

- Cistus × incanus subsp. corsicus = C. creticus subsp. corsicus
- Cistus × incanus subsp. creticus = C. creticus subsp. creticus
