= Parafomoria =

Scientific classification
- Domain: Eukaryota
- Kingdom: Animalia
- Phylum: Arthropoda
- Class: Insecta
- Order: Lepidoptera
- Family: Nepticulidae
- Genus: Parafomoria; Borkowski, 1975

Genus of moths

Parafomoria is a genus of moths of the family Nepticulidae.

== Species ==
- Parafomoria cistivora (Peyerimhoff 1871)
- Parafomoria fumanae A. & Z. Lastuvka 2005
- Parafomoria halimivora van Nieukerken 1985
- Parafomoria helianthemella (Herrich-Schaffer 1860)
- Parafomoria ladaniphila (Mendes 1910)
- Parafomoria liguricella (Klimesch 1946)
- Parafomoria pseudocistivora van Nieukerken 1983
- Parafomoria tingitella (Walsingham 1904)
