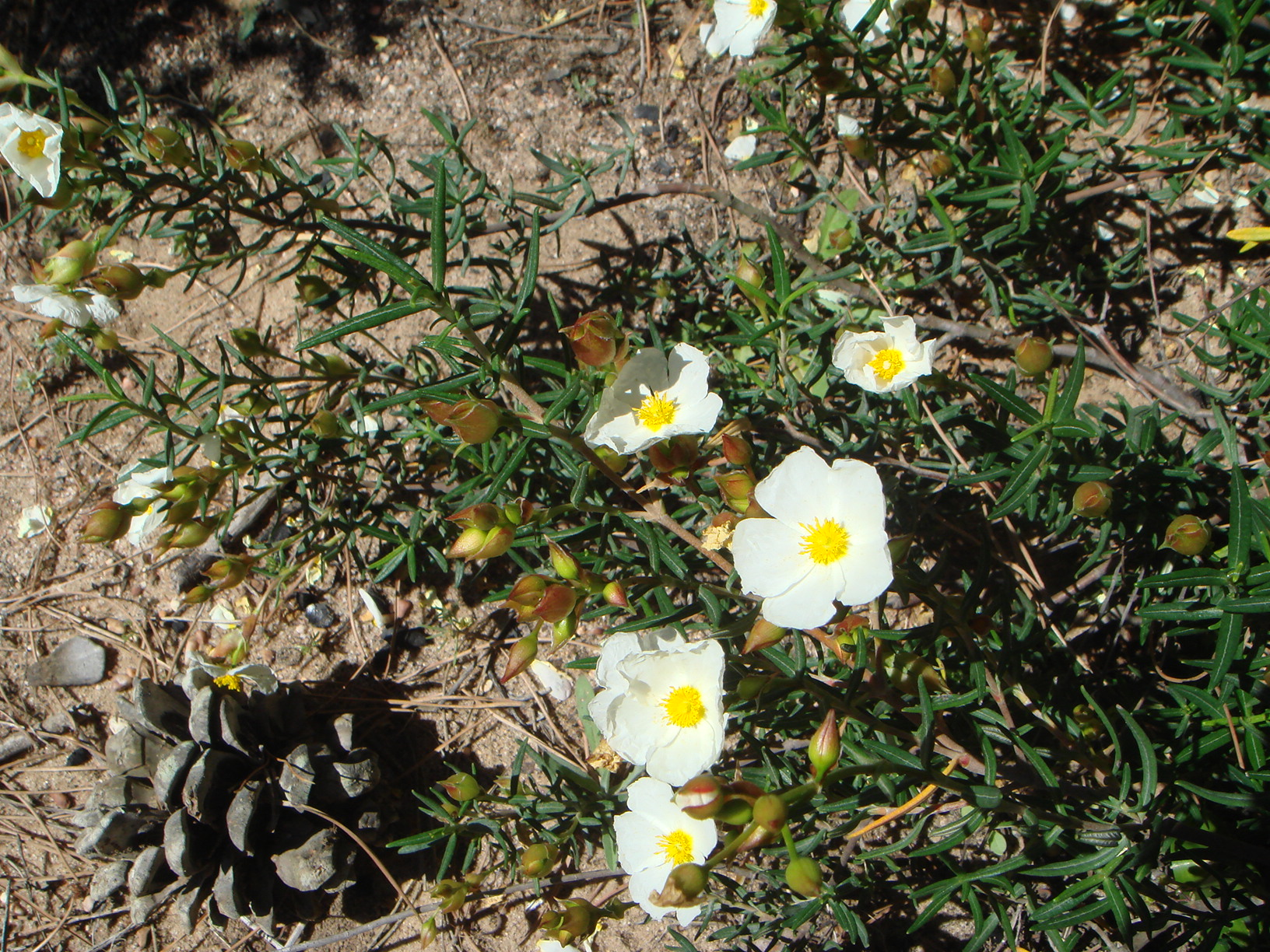

Conservation status
- Least Concern (IUCN 3.1)

Scientific classification
- Kingdom: Plantae
- Clade: Embryophytes
- Clade: Tracheophytes
- Clade: Spermatophytes
- Clade: Angiosperms
- Clade: Eudicots
- Clade: Rosids
- Order: Malvales
- Family: Cistaceae
- Genus: Cistus
- Species: C. libanotis

Binomial name
- Cistus libanotis L.

Synonyms
- Cistus bourgaeanus Coss.

= Cistus libanotis =

Species of flowering plant

Cistus libanotis is a shrubby species of flowering plant in the family Cistaceae, with white flowers. It has been confused with Cistus clusii, which it resembles, resulting in some uncertainty in its distribution. It is endemic to the Iberian Peninsula (in southern Portugal and southwestern Spain).

== Description ==
Cistus libanotis is a prostrate or less often erect shrub, up to 80–120 cm (2 ft 7 in – 3 ft 11 in) tall. It leaves are dark green, long and thin in shape, usually 2–4 cm (0.8–1.6 in) long by 2–5 mm (0.08–0.20 in) wide and with turned under (revolute) margins. The upper surfaces of the leaves have only a few stellate hairs, particularly on the margins and the veins; the lower surfaces have a conspicuous vein and two dense bands of short stellate hairs. The flowers are arranged in cymes or whorls, the top group forming an umbel of three or four flowers. Each flower has three striped reddish sepals, 7–9 mm (0.3–0.4 in) long by 4–5 mm (0.2–0.2 in) wide, and five white petals with a yellow spot at the base, 10–13 mm (0.4–0.5 in) long by 9–12 mm (0.4–0.5 in) wide. The stamens are unequal in length, longer than the pistil. The style is short. The fruiting capsule is 6–7 mm (0.2–0.3 in) long, with relatively large seeds up to 1.8 mm (0.07 in) in diameter.

== Distribution and habitat ==
Cistus libanotis is native to the southwestern Iberian Peninsula (southern Portugal and south-west Spain) where it is commonly found in dry, sandy coastal areas from Campo de Gibraltar to Cape St. Vincent and between Alcácer do Sal and Grândola, but it can also be found as far inland as Paradas, Seville. There are records of this species in Morocco, Algeria and Tunisia, although these may belong to Cistus libanotis auct. non L., i.e. C. clusii.

== Taxonomy ==
Cistus libanotis was first described by Carl Linnaeus in 1759. A different but similar species, Cistus clusii, has regularly been mis-identified as this species. A 2011 molecular phylogenetic study placed C. libanotis in the white and whitish pink clade of Cistus species. No strong relationship with C. clusii was found.

The specific epithet libanotis was the word used for rosemary by Pliny.

== Phylogeny ==
Cistus libanotis belongs to the white and whitish pink flowered clade of Cistus species.

Species-level cladogram of Cistus species.

- - Halimium spp.
  - - Halimium spp.
    - - PPC
        - Cistus crispus
        - - - Cistus heterophyllus
            - - Cistus albidus
              - Cistus creticus
          - - Cistus asper
            - Cistus chinamadensis
            - Cistus horrens
            - Cistus ocreatus
            - Cistus osbeckiifolius
            - Cistus palmensis
            - Cistus symphytifolius
  - WWPC
    - - Cistus clusii
      - Cistus munbyi
    - - Cistus inflatus
      - Cistus ladanifer
      - Cistus laurifolius
      - Cistus libanotis
      - Cistus monspeliensis
      - Cistus parviflorus
      - Cistus populifolius
      - Cistus pouzolzii
      - Cistus salviifolius
      - Cistus sintenisii

Species-level cladogram of Cistus species, based on plastid and nuclear DNA sequences
