= Neotelphusa craterota =

Scientific classification
- Kingdom: Animalia
- Phylum: Arthropoda
- Class: Insecta
- Order: Lepidoptera
- Family: Gelechiidae
- Genus: Neotelphusa
- Species: N. craterota

Binomial name
- Neotelphusa craterota (Meyrick, 1913)

Synonyms
- Telphusa craterota Meyrick, 1913

Species of moth

Neotelphusa craterota is a moth of the family Gelechiidae first described by Edward Meyrick in 1913. It is found in South Africa.

The wingspan is 12–13 mm. The forewings are grey and there is a black basal patch occupying one-third of the wing, the edge nearly vertical, slightly irregular, margined with whitish suffusion, forming a white spot on the costa. There is a white somewhat raised spot in the middle of the disc and a small blackish spot beneath this, followed by some raised whitish scales. There is an irregularly triangular blackish blotch on the costa at two-thirds, connected with a blackish tornal spot by a short fine black white-edged streak, preceded by two small spots of brownish suffusion. Beyond this a suffused white costal spot, where a fine angulated whitish line crosses the wing, followed by some brownish suffusion towards the apex of the wing, and scattered whitish scales. The hindwings are grey, thinly scaled in the disc anteriorly.
