= Neotelphusa flavinotata =

Scientific classification
- Domain: Eukaryota
- Kingdom: Animalia
- Phylum: Arthropoda
- Class: Insecta
- Order: Lepidoptera
- Family: Gelechiidae
- Genus: Neotelphusa
- Species: N. flavinotata

Binomial name
- Neotelphusa flavinotata Janse, 1958

Species of moth

Neotelphusa flavinotata is a moth of the family Gelechiidae. It is found in South Africa.
