= Parafomoria fumanae =

Scientific classification
- Domain: Eukaryota
- Kingdom: Animalia
- Phylum: Arthropoda
- Class: Insecta
- Order: Lepidoptera
- Family: Nepticulidae
- Genus: Parafomoria
- Species: P. fumanae

Binomial name
- Parafomoria fumanae A. & Z. Lastuvka, 2005

Species of moth

Parafomoria fumanae is a moth of the family Nepticulidae. It is found in southern France and Spain.

There are at least two to three generations per year.

The larvae feed on Fumana procumbens. They mine the stems of their host plant.
