= Cistus ocreatus =

Scientific classification
- Kingdom: Plantae
- Clade: Embryophytes
- Clade: Tracheophytes
- Clade: Spermatophytes
- Clade: Angiosperms
- Clade: Eudicots
- Clade: Rosids
- Order: Malvales
- Family: Cistaceae
- Genus: Cistus
- Species: C. ocreatus

Binomial name
- Cistus ocreatus C.Sm.

Synonyms
- Cistus symphytifolius Lam. subsp. leucophyllus (Spach) G.Kunkel; Cistus symphytifolius Lam. var. leucophyllus (Spach) Dansereau

Species of flowering plant

Cistus ocreatus is a shrubby species of flowering plant in the family Cistaceae, with purple-pink flowers. It is sometimes treated as synonymous with Cistus symphytifolius or as its subspecies C. symphytifolius subsp. leucophyllus. Its name is sometimes spelt Cistus ochreatus. It is endemic to Gran Canaria in the Canary Islands.

== Description ==
Cistus ocreatus has ovate leaves with three main veins and a short stalk (petiole). The flowers are purple, with styles longer than the stamens. It resembles Cistus symphytifolius, but has smaller flowers, and its leaves have a whitish appearance due to a covering of fine hairs.

== Taxonomy and phylogeny ==
The name Cistus ocreatus originates from Christen Smith, who collected plants in the Canary Islands. Smith died in 1816. In 1819 (i.e. after Smith's death), the name and description were published by Christian Leopold von Buch, attributed to "Dr Smith's notes". Smith differentiated C. ocreatus from Cistus symphytifolius (which he called C. vaginatus), noting that it had smaller flowers. (Note: von Buch (1819), "Petalis [...] minor. quam in C. vagin." (with petals ... smaller than in C. vagin[atus]))

The specific epithet ocreatus derives from the Latin noun ocrea, "greave", plus the ending -atus, "possessing or resembling". Although the noun may also be spelt ochrea, the spelling ocreatus was used by Buch in publishing Smith's notes.

An alternative name for the taxon derives ultimately from Édouard Spach, who in 1836 published a description of Rhodocistus berthelotianus, including variety leucophyllus. Rhodocistus berthelotianus was later synonymized with Cistus symphytifolius, and Günther Kunkel transferred the variety as the subspecies C. symphytifolius subsp. leucophyllus. Smith's name Cistus ocreatus is considered to be a synonym of C. symphytifolius or its subspecies leucophyllus by some sources; others accept it as an independent species.

A 2011 molecular phylogenetic study placed C. ocreatus as a member of the purple and pink flowered clade (PPC) of Cistus species, along with some other Canary Island endemics (Cistus asper, Cistus chinamadensis, Cistus horrens, and Cistus symphytifolius).

Species-level cladogram of Cistus species

- - Halimium spp.
  - - Halimium spp.
    - - PPC
        - Cistus crispus
        - - - Cistus heterophyllus
            - - Cistus albidus
              - Cistus creticus
          - - Cistus asper
            - Cistus chinamadensis
            - Cistus horrens
            - Cistus ocreatus
            - Cistus osbeckiifolius
            - Cistus palmensis
            - Cistus symphytifolius
  - WWPC
    - - Cistus clusii
      - Cistus munbyi
    - - Cistus inflatus
      - Cistus ladanifer
      - Cistus laurifolius
      - Cistus libanotis
      - Cistus monspeliensis
      - Cistus parviflorus
      - Cistus populifolius
      - Cistus pouzolzii
      - Cistus salviifolius
      - Cistus sintenisii

Species-level cladogram of Cistus species, based on plastid and nuclear DNA sequences

== Distribution and habitat ==
Cistus ocreatus is endemic to Gran Canaria, where it is found in pine forests at altitudes of 860–1,400 metres (2,820–4,590 ft), in a climate described as "subhumid" and "temperate-warm".
