= Neotelphusa melicentra =

Scientific classification
- Kingdom: Animalia
- Phylum: Arthropoda
- Class: Insecta
- Order: Lepidoptera
- Family: Gelechiidae
- Genus: Neotelphusa
- Species: N. melicentra

Binomial name
- Neotelphusa melicentra (Meyrick, 1921)

Synonyms
- Gelechia melicentra Meyrick, 1921

Species of moth

Neotelphusa melicentra is a moth of the family Gelechiidae first described by Edward Meyrick in 1921.

== Description ==
The wingspan is about 7 mm for males and 8 mm for females. The forewings are white speckled with dark grey and with a line of blackish-grey irroration (sprinkles) along the costa from the base to two-fifths, and a short similar mark beyond the middle. There are pale yellowish dots accompanied with a few blackish scales as follows, one towards the costa at one-fifth, one beneath the fold slightly beyond this, one nearer the costa at two-fifths, and three representing the stigmata, the first discal about the middle, the plical nearly beneath it and a small dorsal spot of black irroration beneath the second discal. There is some grey suffusion and scattered black irroration towards the apex. The hindwings are light grey.

== Distribution ==
It is found in Mozambique.
