= Neotelphusa limenaea =

Scientific classification
- Kingdom: Animalia
- Phylum: Arthropoda
- Class: Insecta
- Order: Lepidoptera
- Family: Gelechiidae
- Genus: Neotelphusa
- Species: N. limenaea

Binomial name
- Neotelphusa limenaea (Meyrick, 1920)

Synonyms
- Telphusa limenaea Meyrick, 1920

Species of moth

Neotelphusa limenaea is a moth of the family Gelechiidae. It is found in South Africa.

The wingspan is about 12 mm. The forewings are dark grey, with the tips of the scales very finely whitish and the extreme base mixed with black. There is a broad white antemedian fascia edged with blackish anteriorly and preceded by a brown subcostal mark, its posterior half not reaching the costa and marked with a black subcostal dot in an indentation, its posterior margin followed by a brown transverse spot in the disc, opposite white costal and tornal spots at three-fourths, their anterior angles connected by a black mark, above and beneath which is some brownish suffusion. The hindwings are pale grey.
