= Neotelphusa ochlerodes =

Scientific classification
- Kingdom: Animalia
- Phylum: Arthropoda
- Clade: Pancrustacea
- Class: Insecta
- Order: Lepidoptera
- Family: Gelechiidae
- Genus: Neotelphusa
- Species: N. ochlerodes

Binomial name
- Neotelphusa ochlerodes (Meyrick, 1926)

Synonyms
- Telphusa ochlerodes Meyrick, 1926

Species of moth

Neotelphusa ochlerodes is a moth of the family Gelechiidae. It is found in Namibia.

The wingspan is about 15 mm. The forewings are grey, with the tips of the scales whitish, with a faint rosy tinge, more marked posteriorly. There are small blackish spots on the base of the costa and dorsum and an oblique irregular blackish streak from the costa at one-sixth to below the fold. The stigmata are black, moderate, the plical elongate, hardly before the first discal, a small spot obliquely above and before the first discal and one on the costa above this, the second discal forming an irregular transverse mark. There is also a blackish spot on the costa above this and a dark grey suffused spot connecting it with the dorsum, as well as some scattered blackish irroration in the disc towards the apex and indistinct dark grey marginal dots towards the apex. The hindwings are grey, in the disc thinly scaled and subhyaline with a bluish tinge.
