= Parafomoria tingitella =

Scientific classification
- Kingdom: Animalia
- Phylum: Arthropoda
- Class: Insecta
- Order: Lepidoptera
- Family: Nepticulidae
- Genus: Parafomoria
- Species: P. tingitella

Binomial name
- Parafomoria tingitella (Walsingham, 1904)

Synonyms
- Nepticula tingitella Walsingham, 1904; Stigmella tingitella

Species of moth

Parafomoria ladaniphila is a moth of the family Nepticulidae. It is found in Morocco and Portugal.

The length of the forewings is 1.9–2 mm for males and about 2.2 mm for females. Adults are on wing from February to March.

The larvae feed on Tuberaria lignosa. They mine the leaves of their host plant.
