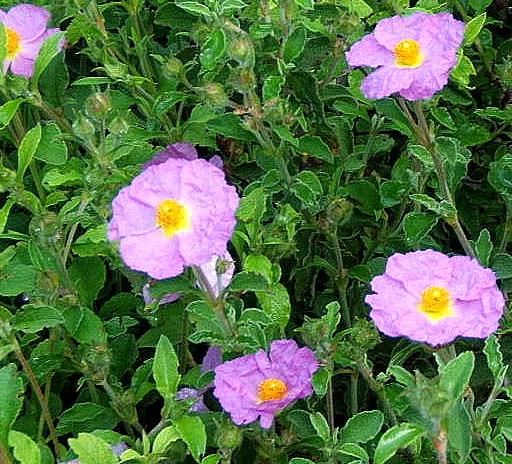

Scientific classification
- Kingdom: Plantae
- Clade: Embryophytes
- Clade: Tracheophytes
- Clade: Spermatophytes
- Clade: Angiosperms
- Clade: Eudicots
- Clade: Rosids
- Order: Malvales
- Family: Cistaceae
- Genus: Cistus
- Species: C. creticus

Binomial name
- Cistus creticus L.

Subspecies
- Cistus creticus subsp. creticus; Cistus creticus subsp. trabutii (Maire) Dobignard

Synonyms
- Cistus × incanus var. creticus (L.) Boiss. (1867); Cistus × incanus subsp. creticus (L.) Heywood (1968); Cistus polymorphus f. creticus (L.) Batt. (1888); Cistus polymorphus var. creticus (L.) Ball (1877); Cistus villosus subsp. creticus (L.) Nyman (1878); Cistus villosus var. creticus (L.) Boiss. (1867); Cistus vulgaris Spach (1836), nom. superfl.; Cistus vulgaris var. creticus (L.) Steud. (1840), nom. superfl.

= Cistus creticus =

Species of flowering plant

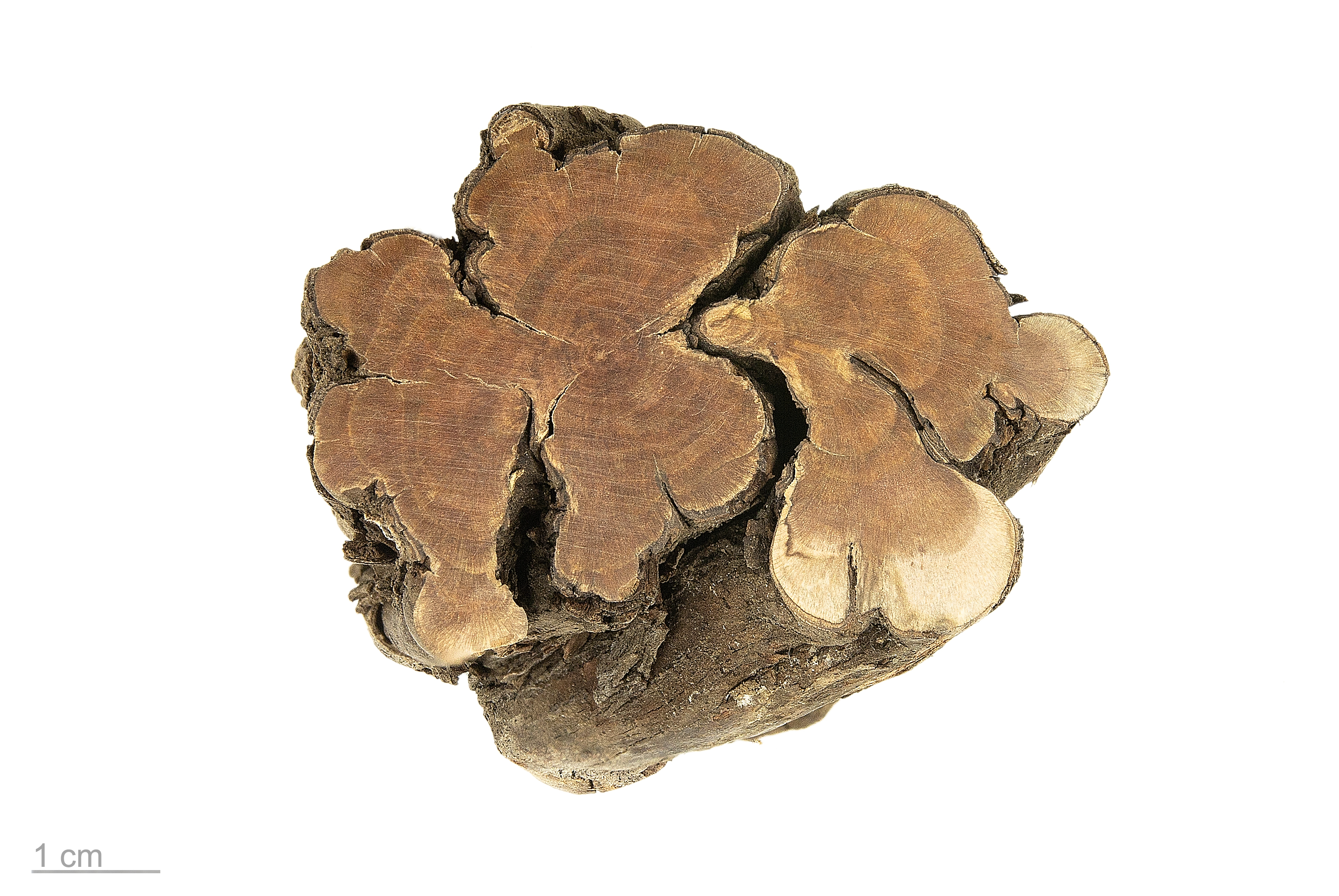
Cistus creticus (MHNT)

Cistus creticus (pink rock-rose, hoary rock-rose) is a species of shrubby plant in the family Cistaceae. Though it usually has pink flowers, of 4.5–5 cm (1.8–2.0 in) diameter, this species is very variable. It is widely known as a decorative plant. It is frequently called "Cistus incanus". (The true Cistus × incanus is the hybrid C. albidus × C. crispus.)

It is native to the central and eastern Mediterranean Basin, including Morocco, Corsica and Sardinia, Italy and southeastern Europe, Turkey, and the Levant.

== Taxonomy ==
The name Cistus creticus was first used by Carl Linnaeus in 1762. Confusion exists between this name and one published earlier by Linnaeus, Cistus incanus. As used by many authors, but not Linnaeus, the name "C. incanus" is taken to refer to Cistus creticus, particularly C. creticus subsp. eriocephalus.

=== Subspecies ===
Two subspecies are accepted.

- Cistus creticus subsp. creticus – central and eastern Mediterranean Basin
- Cistus creticus subsp. trabutii (Maire) Dobignard – Morocco

There are also several well-known cultivars, such as 'Lasithi' with compact, rounded flowers.

== Phylogeny ==
Cistus creticus belongs to the clade of species with purple and pink flowers (the "purple pink clade" or PPC), in a subclade with C. heterophyllus and C. albidus.

Species-level cladogram of Cistus species.

- - Halimium spp.
  - - Halimium spp.
    - - PPC
        - Cistus crispus
        - - - Cistus heterophyllus
            - - Cistus albidus
              - Cistus creticus
          - - Cistus asper
            - Cistus chinamadensis
            - Cistus horrens
            - Cistus ocreatus
            - Cistus osbeckiifolius
            - Cistus palmensis
            - Cistus symphytifolius
  - WWPC
    - - Cistus clusii
      - Cistus munbyi
    - - Cistus inflatus
      - Cistus ladanifer
      - Cistus laurifolius
      - Cistus libanotis
      - Cistus monspeliensis
      - Cistus parviflorus
      - Cistus populifolius
      - Cistus pouzolzii
      - Cistus salviifolius
      - Cistus sintenisii

Species-level cladogram of Cistus species, based on plastid and nuclear DNA sequences
