= Neotelphusa anisogrisea =

Scientific classification
- Domain: Eukaryota
- Kingdom: Animalia
- Phylum: Arthropoda
- Class: Insecta
- Order: Lepidoptera
- Family: Gelechiidae
- Genus: Neotelphusa
- Species: N. anisogrisea

Binomial name
- Neotelphusa anisogrisea Janse, 1958

Species of moth

Neotelphusa anisogrisea is a moth of the family Gelechiidae. It is found in Namibia and South Africa.
