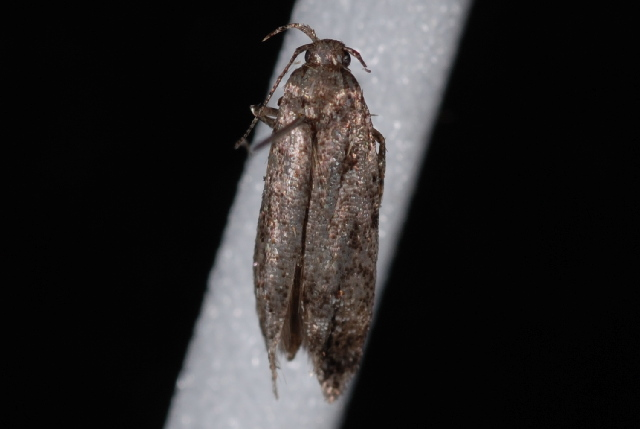

Scientific classification
- Domain: Eukaryota
- Kingdom: Animalia
- Phylum: Arthropoda
- Class: Insecta
- Order: Lepidoptera
- Family: Gelechiidae
- Genus: Neotelphusa
- Species: N. praefixa

Binomial name
- Neotelphusa praefixa (Braun, 1921)

Synonyms
- Telphusa praefixa Braun, 1921

= Neotelphusa praefixa =

Species of moth

Neotelphusa praefixa is a moth of the family Gelechiidae. It is found in North America, where it has been recorded in Alberta, British Columbia, Maine, Manitoba, Montana, Ontario, Quebec and Saskatchewan.

The wingspan is 13.5–14 mm. The forewings are dark fuscous, sprinkled with black scales in the middle and apical part of the wing. The scales near the base are minutely tipped with whitish. From the basal fourth of the costa an outwardly oblique pale fascia, narrowing toward the dorsum, reaches a little beyond the fold. It is bordered inwardly by a heavy line of black scales, which ends in a small patch of raised black and whitish scales just below the fold. There is also a small patch of raised black and white scales on the fold beyond the fascia and an indistinct pale spot in the middle of the costa, as well as an irregular transverse pale fascia at three-fourths concolorous with the oblique fascia, scarcely reaching the dorsum, and sending a short broad inward projection basalwards in the middle of the wing. At the inner edge of this projection is a small patch of raised black scales. The hindwings are fuscous.
