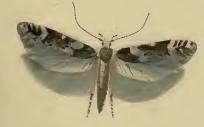
- 'Neotelphusa sequax

Scientific classification
- Domain: Eukaryota
- Kingdom: Animalia
- Phylum: Arthropoda
- Class: Insecta
- Order: Lepidoptera
- Family: Gelechiidae
- Subfamily: Gelechiinae
- Tribe: Litini
- Genus: Neotelphusa; Janse, 1958

= Neotelphusa =

Genus of moths

Neotelphusa is a genus of moths in the family Gelechiidae.

== Species ==
- Neotelphusa anisogrisea Janse, 1958
- Neotelphusa bimaculata Janse, 1958
- Neotelphusa castrigera (Meyrick, 1913)
- Neotelphusa cirrhomacula Janse, 1958
- Neotelphusa cisti (Stainton, 1869)
- Neotelphusa craterota (Meyrick, 1913)
- Neotelphusa ferrugilinea Janse, 1958
- Neotelphusa flavinotata Janse, 1958
- Neotelphusa huemeri (Nel, 1998)
- Neotelphusa fuscisparsa Janse, 1958
- Neotelphusa limenaea (Meyrick, 1920)
- Neotelphusa melicentra (Meyrick, 1921)
- Neotelphusa obliquifascia Janse, 1960
- Neotelphusa ochlerodes (Meyrick, 1926)
- Neotelphusa ochrophthalma (Meyrick, 1927)
- Neotelphusa pallidistola Janse, 1958
- Neotelphusa phaeomacula Janse, 1958
- Neotelphusa praefixa (Braun, 1921)
- Neotelphusa querciella (Chambers, 1872)
- Neotelphusa sequax (Haworth, 1828)
- Neotelphusa similella Janse, 1958
- Neotelphusa tapinota Janse, 1958
- Neotelphusa traugotti (Huemer & Karsholt, 2001)
