= Neotelphusa cirrhomacula =

Scientific classification
- Kingdom: Animalia
- Phylum: Arthropoda
- Clade: Pancrustacea
- Class: Insecta
- Order: Lepidoptera
- Family: Gelechiidae
- Genus: Neotelphusa
- Species: N. cirrhomacula

Binomial name
- Neotelphusa cirrhomacula Janse, 1958

Species of moth

Neotelphusa cirrhomacula is a moth of the family Gelechiidae. It is found in South Africa.
