= Neotelphusa traugotti =

Scientific classification
- Kingdom: Animalia
- Phylum: Arthropoda
- Clade: Pancrustacea
- Class: Insecta
- Order: Lepidoptera
- Family: Gelechiidae
- Genus: Neotelphusa
- Species: N. traugotti

Binomial name
- Neotelphusa traugotti (Huemer & Karsholt, 2001)

Synonyms
- Teleiodes traugotti Huemer & Karsholt, 2001

Species of moth

Neotelphusa traugotti is a moth of the family Gelechiidae. It is found in the Spain.

The wingspan is about 10 mm. Adults have been recorded on wing in July and August.

== Etymology ==
The species is named after Danish entomologist Ernst Christian Traugott-Olsen, who first collected the species.
