= Neotelphusa castrigera =

Scientific classification
- Kingdom: Animalia
- Phylum: Arthropoda
- Class: Insecta
- Order: Lepidoptera
- Family: Gelechiidae
- Genus: Neotelphusa
- Species: N. castrigera

Binomial name
- Neotelphusa castrigera (Meyrick, 1913)

Synonyms
- Telphusa castrigera Meyrick, 1913

Species of moth

Neotelphusa castrigera is a moth of the family Gelechiidae first described by Edward Meyrick in 1913. It is found in South Africa and Zimbabwe.

The wingspan is about 14 mm. The forewings are dark grey with the basal area blackish grey, limited by an irregular oblique blackish fascia, followed by a broader fascia of whitish suffusion except towards the dorsum. There is an irregular white ring in the middle of the disc, partly tinged with ochreous, anteriorly projecting into the preceding whitish fascia. There is also a raised blackish transverse mark extending from the tornus more than halfway across the wing, surmounted with pale ochreous. Beyond this is some whitish suffusion towards the costa and some black irroration (sprinkles) towards the apex. The hindwings are grey, darker posteriorly.
