= Neotelphusa querciella =

Scientific classification
- Kingdom: Animalia
- Phylum: Arthropoda
- Clade: Pancrustacea
- Class: Insecta
- Order: Lepidoptera
- Family: Gelechiidae
- Genus: Neotelphusa
- Species: N. querciella

Binomial name
- Neotelphusa querciella (Chambers, 1872)

Synonyms
- Depressaria querciella Chambers, 1872

Species of moth

Neotelphusa querciella is a moth of the family Gelechiidae. It is found in North America, where it has been recorded from Alabama, Kentucky, Maine, Mississippi, North Carolina and Tennessee. The larvae feed on Quercus obtusiloba.
