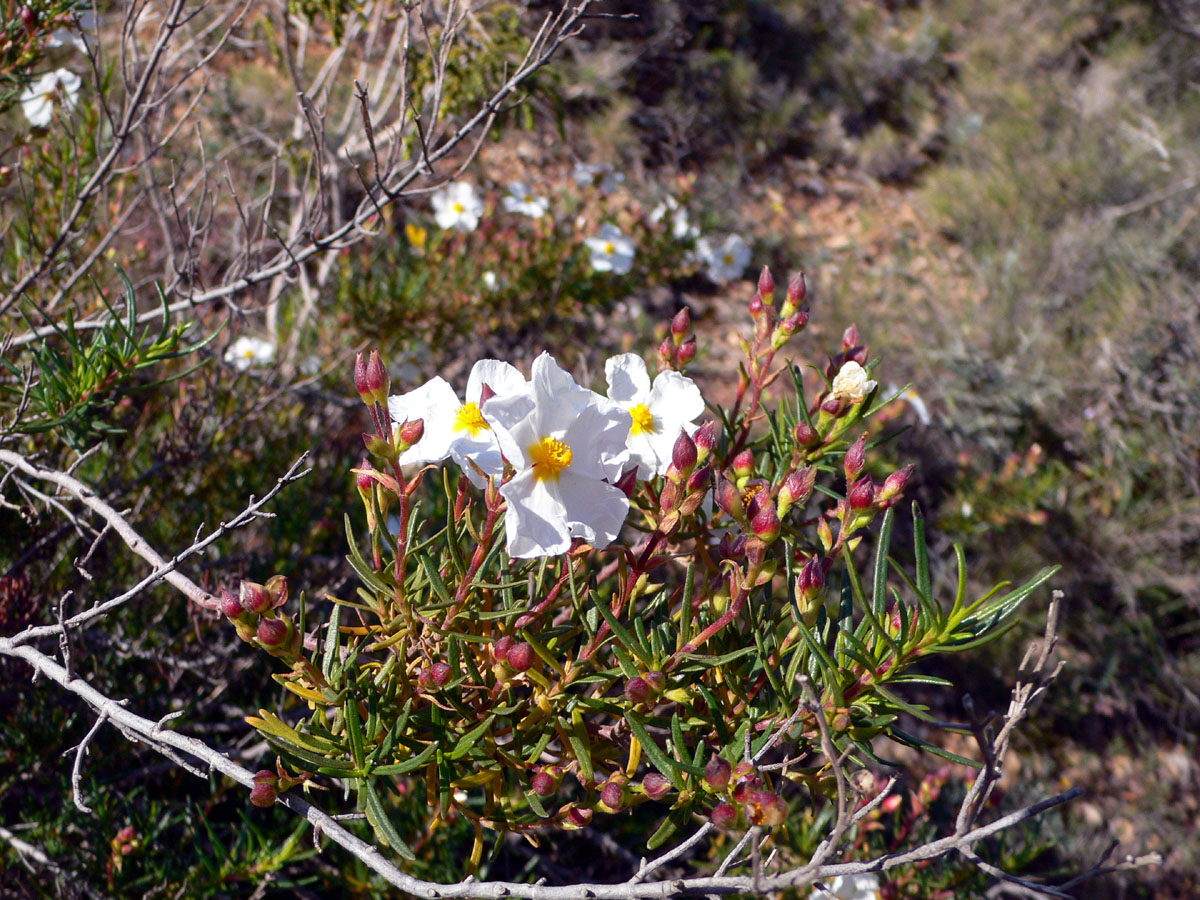

Scientific classification
- Kingdom: Plantae
- Clade: Embryophytes
- Clade: Tracheophytes
- Clade: Spermatophytes
- Clade: Angiosperms
- Clade: Eudicots
- Clade: Rosids
- Order: Malvales
- Family: Cistaceae
- Genus: Cistus
- Species: C. clusii

Binomial name
- Cistus clusii Dunal

Synonyms
- Cistus fastigiatus Guss.; Cistus rosmarinifolius Pourr.; Cistus sedjera Pomel; Cistus libanotis auct. mult., non L.

= Cistus clusii =

Species of flowering plant

Cistus clusii is a shrubby species of flowering plant in the family Cistaceae, with white flowers, native to south west and south central Europe and north Africa. It has been wrongly called Cistus libanotis by many authors.

== Description ==
Cistus clusii is a much branched shrub, up to 1 m (3 ft) tall. Its leaves are narrowly linear in shape, usually 1–2.5 cm (0.4–1.0 in) long by 1–2 mm (0.04–0.08 in) wide, with edges that are turned under (revolute), green on the upper side and densely covered with short hairs on the lower side, producing a whitish appearance. The flowers are arranged in umbel-like cymes with up to 12 individual flowers, each 2–3 cm (0.8–1.2 in) across with five white petals and three sepals, 5–8 mm (0.2–0.3 in) long. The flower stalks (peduncles and pedicels) and the sepals are covered with long white hairs. The style is short.

== Taxonomy ==
Cistus clusii was first described by Michel Félix Dunal in 1824. The specific epithet clusii honours Carolus Clusius. The name Cistus libanotis has been wrongly applied to this species by many authors. A 2011 molecular phylogenetic study placed C. clusii in a clade with Cistus munbyi in the white and whitish pink clade of Cistus species, sister to all the remaining white and whitish pink flowered species.

== Phylogeny ==
Cistus clusii belongs to the white and whitish pink flowered clade of Cistus species.

Species-level cladogram of Cistus species.

- - Halimium spp.
  - - Halimium spp.
    - - PPC
        - Cistus crispus
        - - - Cistus heterophyllus
            - - Cistus albidus
              - Cistus creticus
          - - Cistus asper
            - Cistus chinamadensis
            - Cistus horrens
            - Cistus ocreatus
            - Cistus osbeckiifolius
            - Cistus palmensis
            - Cistus symphytifolius
  - WWPC
    - - Cistus clusii
      - Cistus munbyi
    - - Cistus inflatus
      - Cistus ladanifer
      - Cistus laurifolius
      - Cistus libanotis
      - Cistus monspeliensis
      - Cistus parviflorus
      - Cistus populifolius
      - Cistus pouzolzii
      - Cistus salviifolius
      - Cistus sintenisii

Species-level cladogram of Cistus species, based on plastid and nuclear DNA sequences

== Distribution ==
Cistus clusii is native to north Africa and the west and central Mediterranean region: southern Spain, the Balearic Islands, south-east Italy and Sicily.
