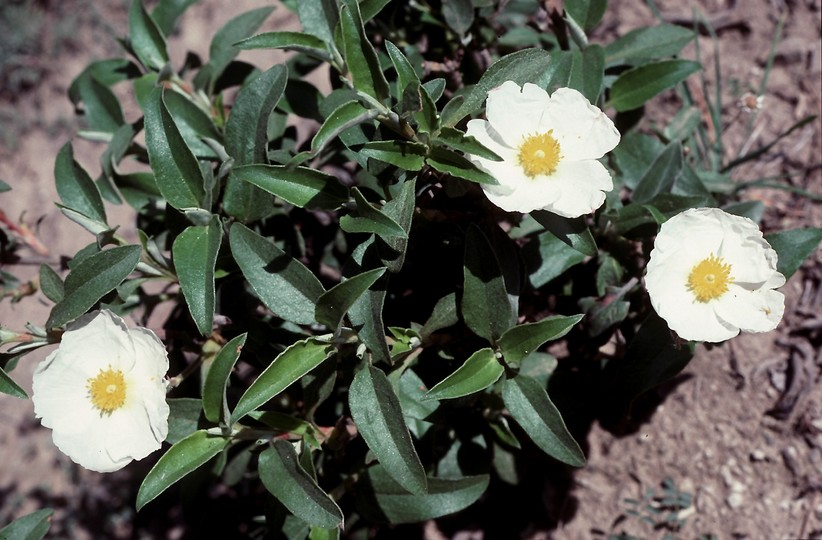

Scientific classification
- Kingdom: Plantae
- Clade: Tracheophytes
- Clade: Angiosperms
- Clade: Eudicots
- Clade: Rosids
- Order: Malvales
- Family: Cistaceae
- Genus: Cistus
- Species: C. laurifolius

Binomial name
- Cistus laurifolius L.

= Cistus laurifolius =

Species of flowering plant

Cistus laurifolius, commonly called laurel-leaf cistus, laurel-leaved cistus or laurel-leaved rock rose, is a species of highly branched flowering evergreen shrub native to some areas around the Mediterranean.

== Description ==
It grows 0.8–2 m (2 ft 7 in – 6 ft 7 in) high. The branches are strong and erect, with reddish bark that is easily removed in strips. The leaves are larger than in the other species of Cistus, up to 9 cm (4 in) long, lanceolate, dark green, while the underside is whitish due to trichomes. The flowering occurs in late spring (May–June), later than most rockroses. It bears white flowers with a yellow spot at the base of each petal, of 4.5–5 cm diameter It is widely cultivated in gardens, and has gained the Royal Horticultural Society's Award of Garden Merit.

== Distribution and habitat ==
Cistus laurifolius has a disjunct natural distribution throughout the Mediterranean Basin, being found west in Morocco, Iberia (Portugal, Spain), avoiding the wetter climate in the northwest, southern France, Corsica and Tuscany (Italy), and east in Greece and Anatolia.

With the general warming of the atmosphere and the consequent withdrawal of glacial ice, flora surviving from Tertiary times could not re-establish their range in southern Europe; the new post-glacial climate was drier than that of the Tertiary. The original tropical European flora evolved into the present Mediterranean sclerophyll flora. The distribution of some surviving species, such as Cistus laurifolius, shifted to wetter areas, such as the mountains. Due to this, C. laurifolius is named in Spanish in its distribution area as "mountain rockrose", although in the moister coastal west and northwest Iberian Peninsula, it is found at sea level.

Cistus shrubland, including C. laurifolius, resprouts after fire and has seeds that germinate after fires.

== Phylogeny ==
Cistus laurifolius belongs to the white and whitish pink flowered clade of Cistus species.

Species-level cladogram of Cistus species.

- - Halimium spp.
  - - Halimium spp.
    - - PPC
        - Cistus crispus
        - - - Cistus heterophyllus
            - - Cistus albidus
              - Cistus creticus
          - - Cistus asper
            - Cistus chinamadensis
            - Cistus horrens
            - Cistus ocreatus
            - Cistus osbeckiifolius
            - Cistus palmensis
            - Cistus symphytifolius
  - WWPC
    - - Cistus clusii
      - Cistus munbyi
    - - Cistus inflatus
      - Cistus ladanifer
      - Cistus laurifolius
      - Cistus libanotis
      - Cistus monspeliensis
      - Cistus parviflorus
      - Cistus populifolius
      - Cistus pouzolzii
      - Cistus salviifolius
      - Cistus sintenisii

Species-level cladogram of Cistus species, based on plastid and nuclear DNA sequences.

== Gallery ==
Different vegetative and reproductive stages of Cistus laurifolius
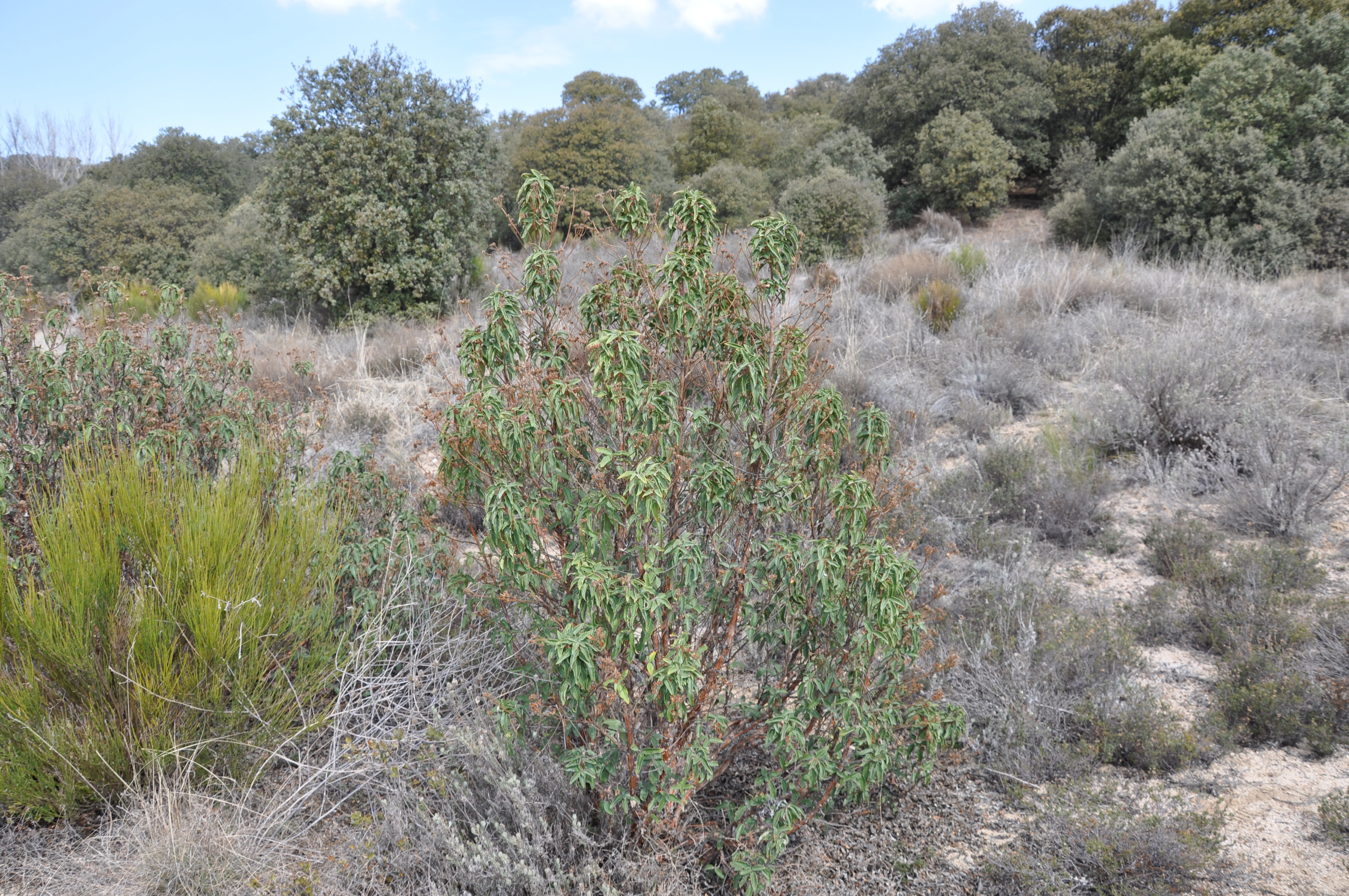
Laurel-leaf cistus in its ecosystem

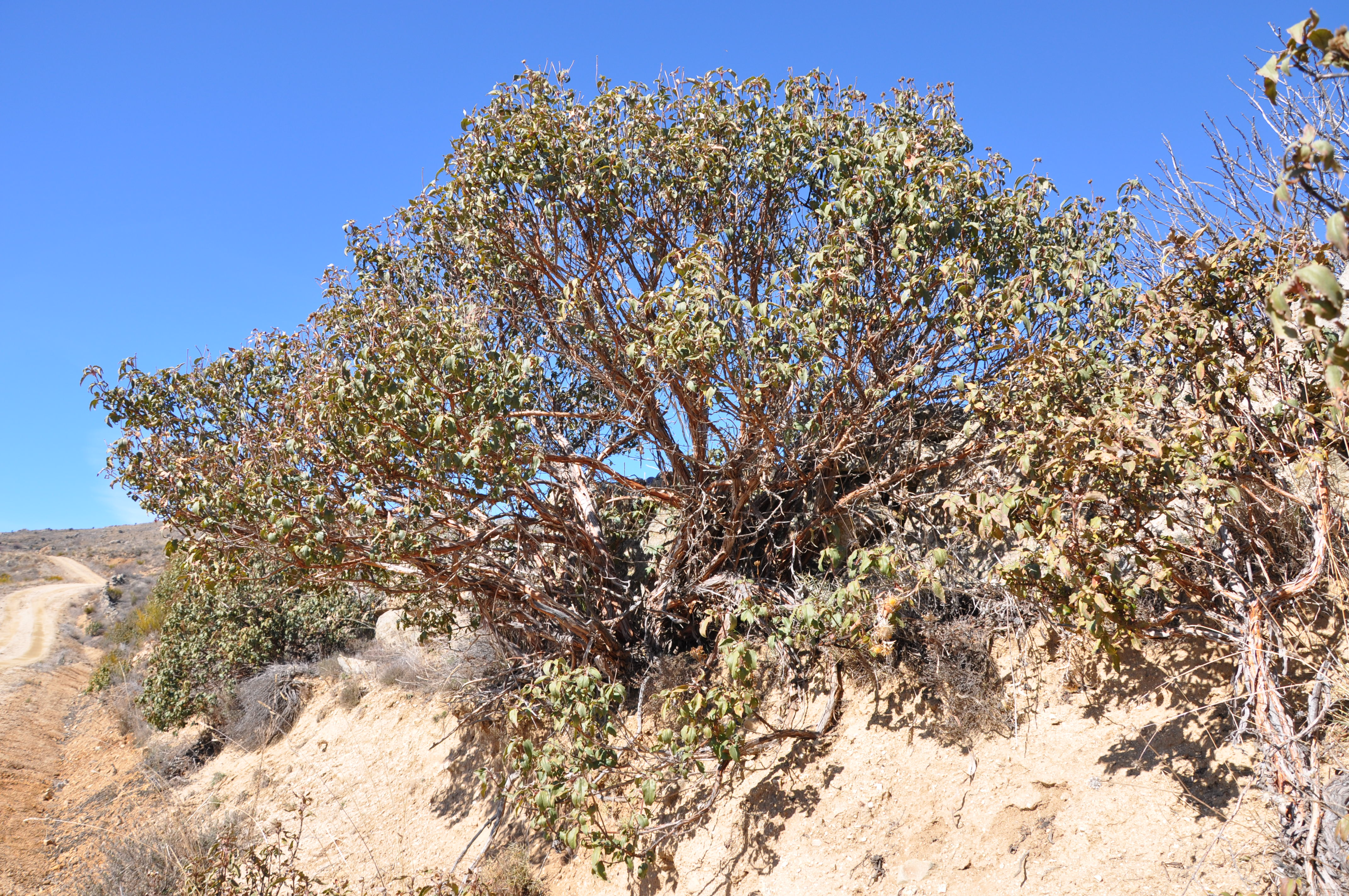
General view of the shrub

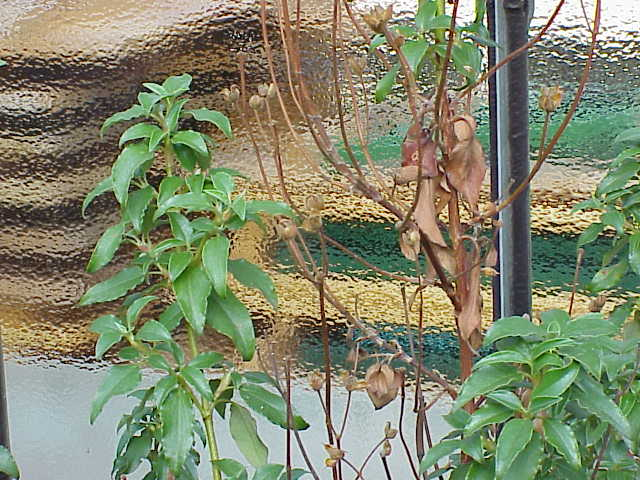
Young branches with the large leaves

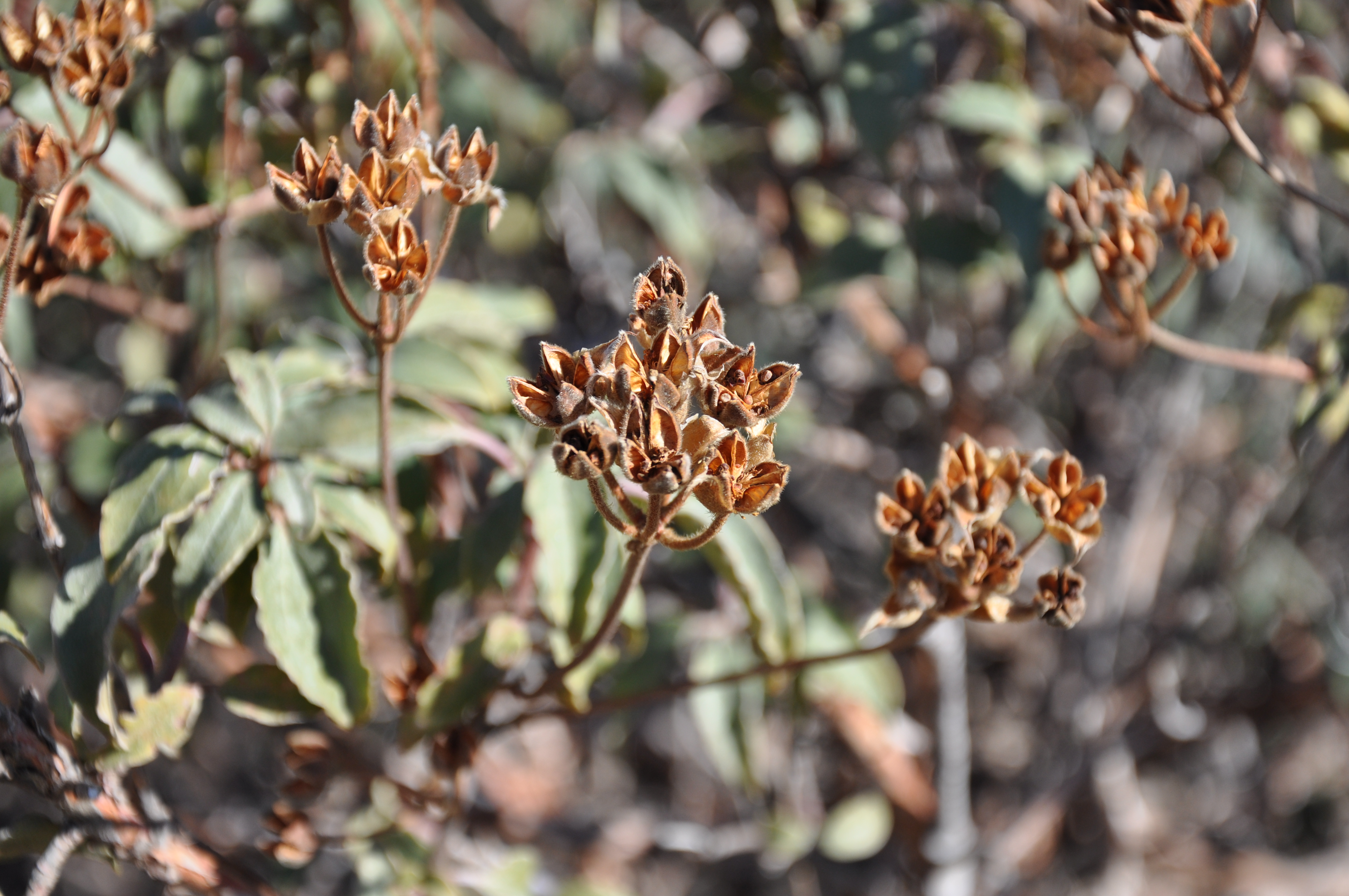
The fruits are capsules, with dehiscence revealing seeds within

== Subtaxa ==
- Cistus laurifolius var. atlanticus Pit.
- Cistus laurifolius var. lanceolatus Rouy & Foucaud
- Cistus laurifolius var. laurifolius
- Cistus laurifolius var. ovatus Rouy & Foucaud
