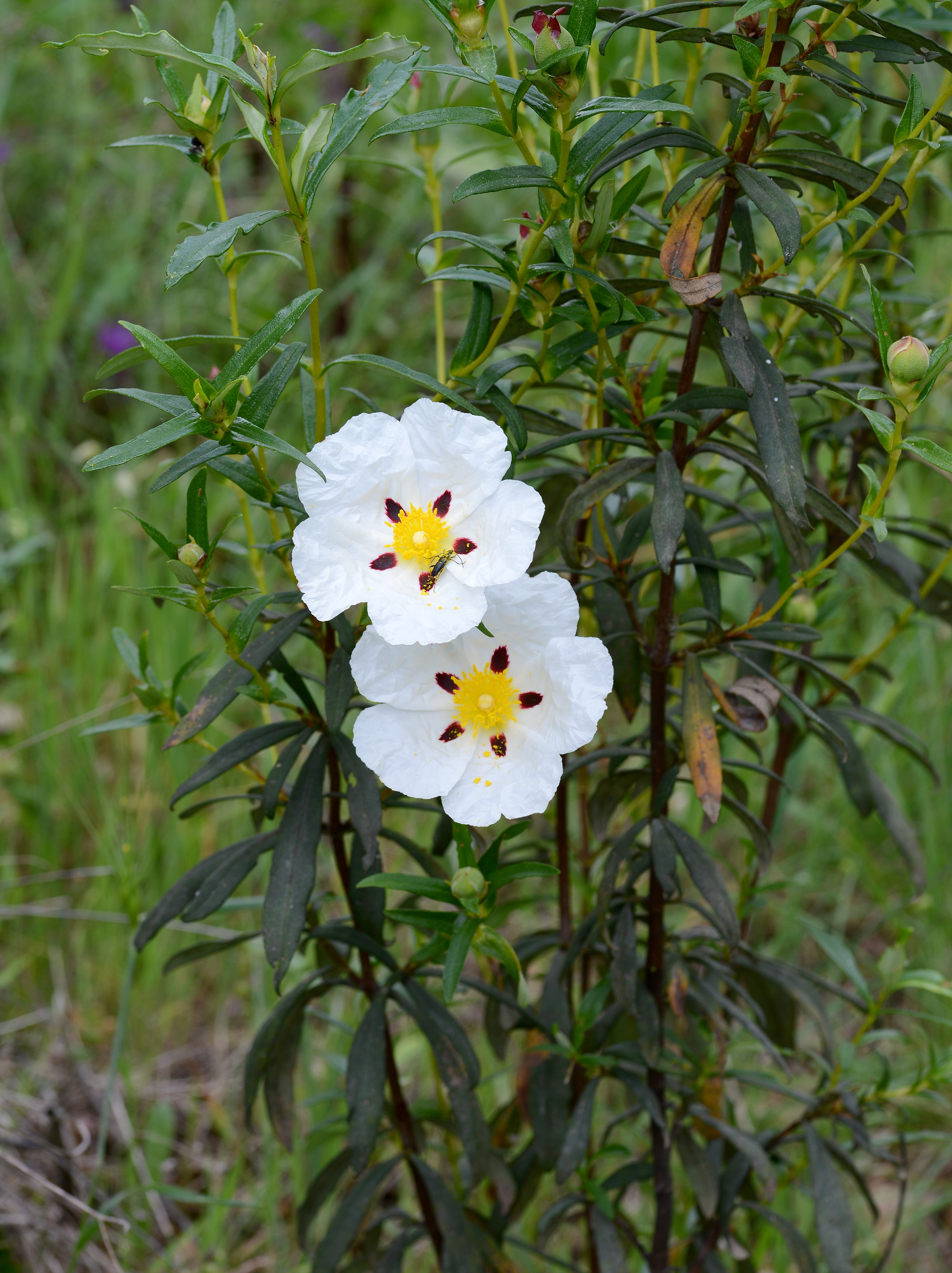

Scientific classification
- Kingdom: Plantae
- Clade: Embryophytes
- Clade: Tracheophytes
- Clade: Spermatophytes
- Clade: Angiosperms
- Clade: Eudicots
- Clade: Rosids
- Order: Malvales
- Family: Cistaceae
- Genus: Cistus
- Species: C. ladanifer

Binomial name
- Cistus ladanifer L.

= Cistus ladanifer =

Species of flowering plant

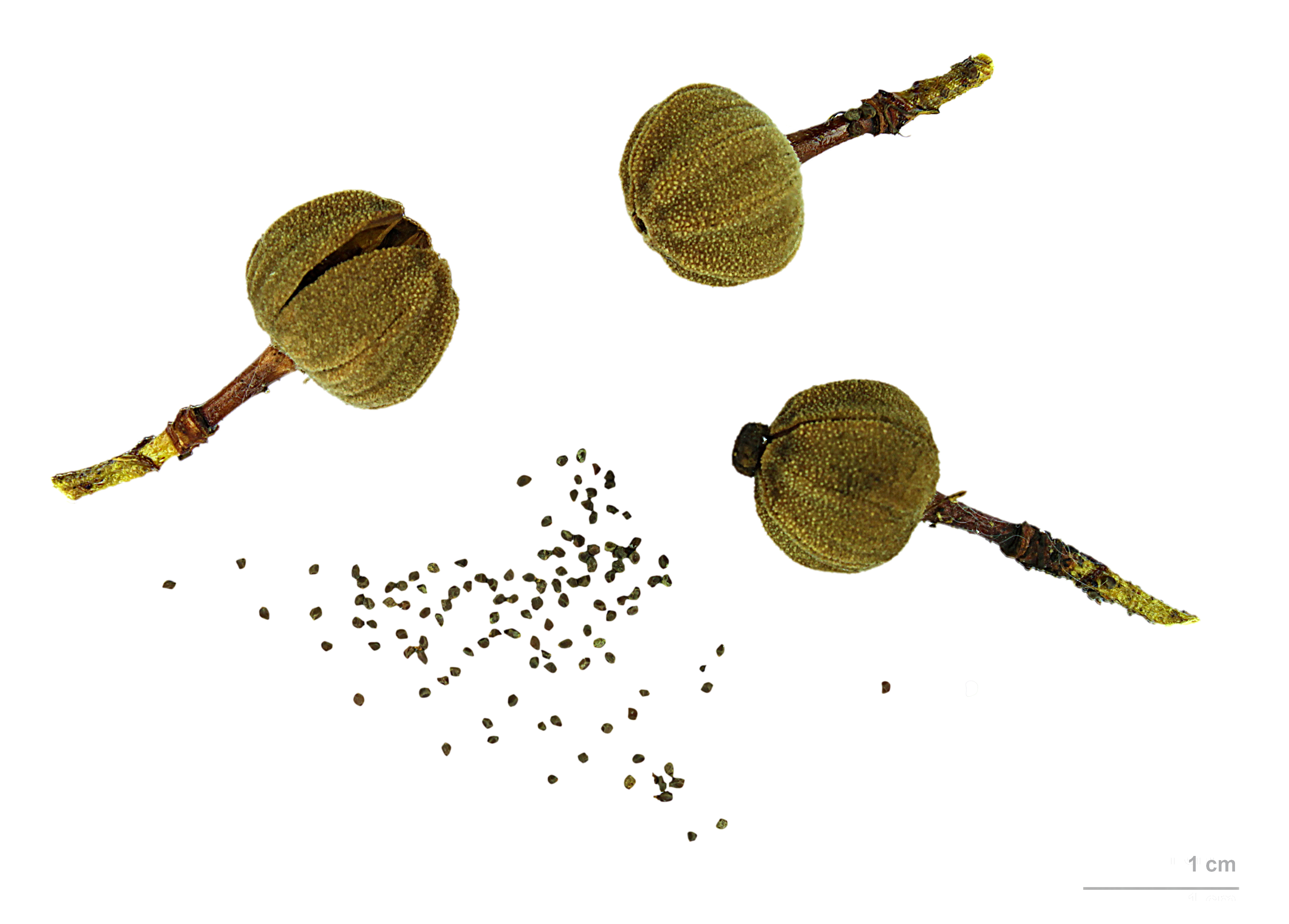
Cistus ladanifer capsule and seeds - MHNT

Cistus ladanifer is a species of flowering plant in the family Cistaceae. It is native to the western Mediterranean region. Common names include gum rockrose, labdanum, common gum cistus, and brown-eyed rockrose.

== Description ==
It is a shrub growing 1–2.5 m (3 ft 3 in – 8 ft 2 in) tall and wide. The leaves are evergreen, lanceolate, 3–10 cm long and 1–2 cm broad, dark green above and paler underneath. The flowers are 5–8 cm diameter, with 5 papery white petals, usually with a red to maroon spot at the base, surrounding the yellow stamens and pistils. The whole plant is covered with the sticky exudate of fragrant resin, the source of labdanum, used in herbal medicine and perfumery.

== Ecology ==
C. ladanifer is particularly well suited to the Mediterranean climate, standing both long summer droughts and cold weather. It is an extremely aggressive plant which has taken over much of former farmland and grasslands in the mountain regions of central Spain and much of southern Portugal. In Spanish it is known as Jara pringosa meaning "sticky shrub". In Portuguese it is known as "esteva". It has been found to have mycorrhizal associations with Boletus edulis, Boletus rhodoxanthus, and Laccaria laccata.

== Systematics ==
The wide distribution and morphological variation of C. ladanifer across northern Africa, the Iberian Peninsula, and southern France has resulted in the recognition of three sub-species: subspp. ladanifer, sulcatus, and africanus.

=== Subspecies ===
- C. ladanifer subsp. ladanifer — Endemic to the Iberian Peninsula, France, Morocco and the Balearic Islands.
- C. ladanifer subsp. mauritianus Pau & Sennen — Endemic to Morocco, Algeria and southern Spain (Málaga Province).
- C. ladanifer subsp. sulcatus Demoly, syn. C. palhinhae Ingram — Endemic to western coastal Portugal.

== Phylogeny ==
C. ladanifer is placed within the C. salvifolius group within the white and whitish pink flowered clade of Cistus species.

Species-level cladogram of Cistus species.

- - Halimium spp.
  - - Halimium spp.
    - - PPC
        - Cistus crispus
        - - - Cistus heterophyllus
            - - Cistus albidus
              - Cistus creticus
          - - Cistus asper
            - Cistus chinamadensis
            - Cistus horrens
            - Cistus ocreatus
            - Cistus osbeckiifolius
            - Cistus palmensis
            - Cistus symphytifolius
  - WWPC
    - - Cistus clusii
      - Cistus munbyi
    - - Cistus inflatus
      - Cistus ladanifer
      - Cistus laurifolius
      - Cistus libanotis
      - Cistus monspeliensis
      - Cistus parviflorus
      - Cistus populifolius
      - Cistus pouzolzii
      - Cistus salviifolius
      - Cistus sintenisii

Species-level cladogram of Cistus species, based on plastid and nuclear DNA sequences

Phylogenetic and divergence dating methods found that C. ladanifer diverged during the Pleistocene, long after the opening of the Strait of Gibraltar around 5 mya, which supports a hypothesis of dispersal for this species. Although its seeds fall close to the maternal plant, C. ladanifer may have successfully dispersed due to its preference for disturbed habitats.

== Uses ==
It is a popular ornamental plant, grown for its strongly resin-scented foliage and conspicuous flowers. Its leaves yield a fragrant oleoresin known as labdanum, used in perfumes, especially as a fixative. (Not to be confused with "Laudanum", another name for tincture of opium).

This plant has gained the Royal Horticultural Society's Award of Garden Merit.

== See also ==
- Boletus edulis – a mushroom species with which it has a mycorrhizal association
