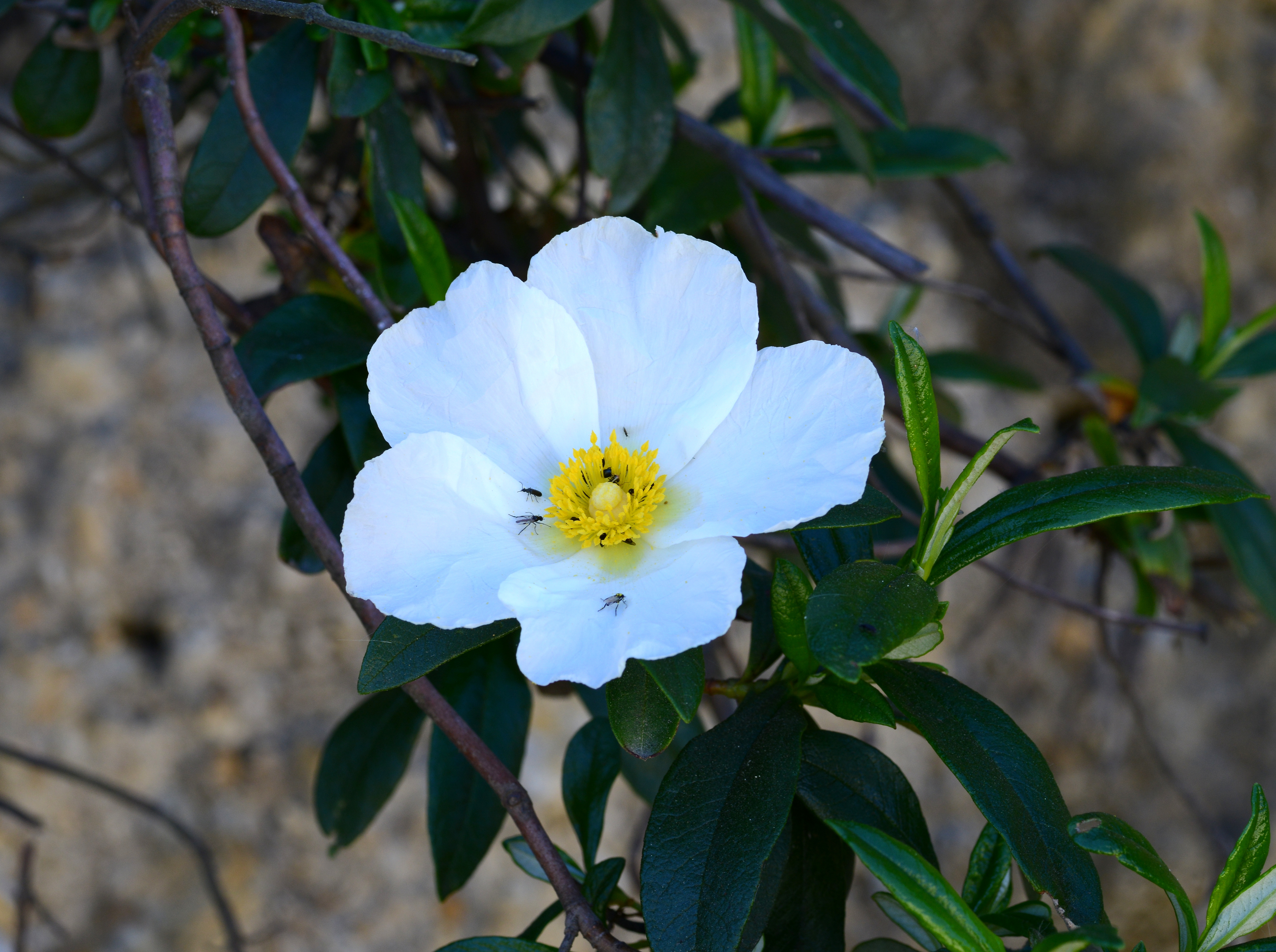

Conservation status
- Least Concern (IUCN 3.1)

Scientific classification
- Kingdom: Plantae
- Clade: Embryophytes
- Clade: Tracheophytes
- Clade: Spermatophytes
- Clade: Angiosperms
- Clade: Eudicots
- Clade: Rosids
- Order: Malvales
- Family: Cistaceae
- Genus: Cistus
- Species: C. monspeliensis

Binomial name
- Cistus monspeliensis L.

= Cistus monspeliensis =

Species of flowering plant

Cistus monspeliensis is a species of rockrose known by the common name Montpellier cistus or narrow-leaved cistus. It is native to southern Europe and northern Africa, in the Mediterranean forests, woodlands, and scrub ecosystems of matorral—maquis shrublands.

== Description ==
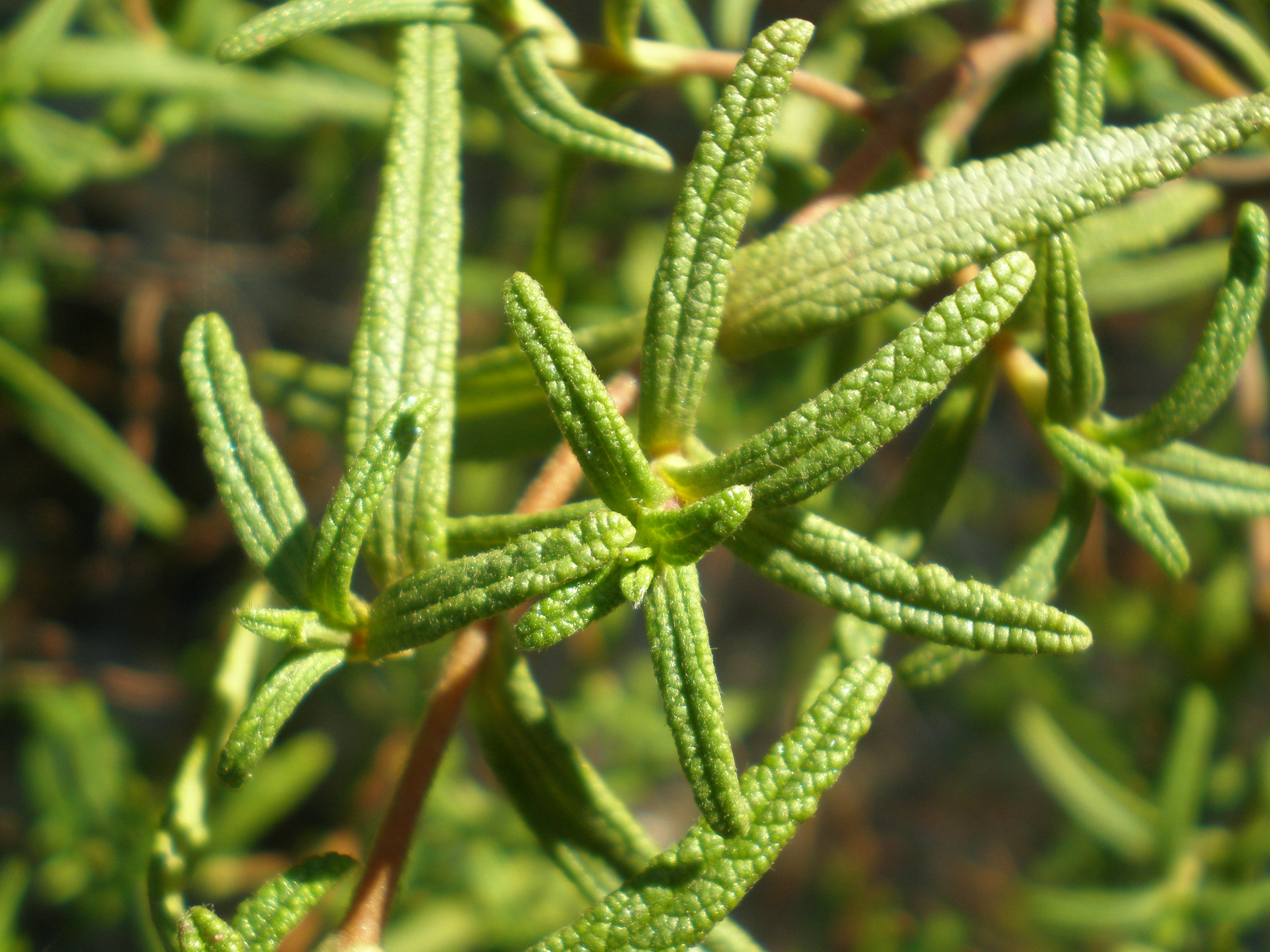
Evergreen leaves of Cistus monspeliensis

Cistus monspeliensis is a shrub with narrow evergreen leaves and a hairy, glandular, sticky surface. The leaves are linear to lance-shaped, green, with a rugose, wrinkled upper surface, up to 5 centimetres (2.0 in) long. In cultivation, C. monspeliensis attains a height of around one meter and a width of 1.5 metres (4 ft 11 in).

The plant's inflorescence is generally a panicle of 2 to 8 flowers, each with five sepals and five white petals.

== Distribution ==
It is mainly distributed throughout the western Mediterranean Basin (Portugal, including Madeira; Spain, including the Canary Islands and Balearic Islands; Morocco; southern France, including Corsica; Italy, including Sardinia and Sicily; Malta; Algeria; Tunisia) but it is also present in Croatia; Serbia; Albania; Montenegro; Greece and Cyprus.

The plant has been reported elsewhere as an introduced species, and in California as an invasive species.

== Phylogeny ==
Cistus monspeliensis belongs to the white and whitish pink flowered clade of Cistus species.

Species-level cladogram of Cistus species

- - Halimium spp.
  - - Halimium spp.
    - - PPC
        - Cistus crispus
        - - - Cistus heterophyllus
            - - Cistus albidus
              - Cistus creticus
          - - Cistus asper
            - Cistus chinamadensis
            - Cistus horrens
            - Cistus ocreatus
            - Cistus osbeckiifolius
            - Cistus palmensis
            - Cistus symphytifolius
  - WWPC
    - - Cistus clusii
      - Cistus munbyi
    - - Cistus inflatus
      - Cistus ladanifer
      - Cistus laurifolius
      - Cistus libanotis
      - Cistus monspeliensis
      - Cistus parviflorus
      - Cistus populifolius
      - Cistus pouzolzii
      - Cistus salviifolius
      - Cistus sintenisii

Species-level cladogram of Cistus species, based on plastid and nuclear DNA sequences
