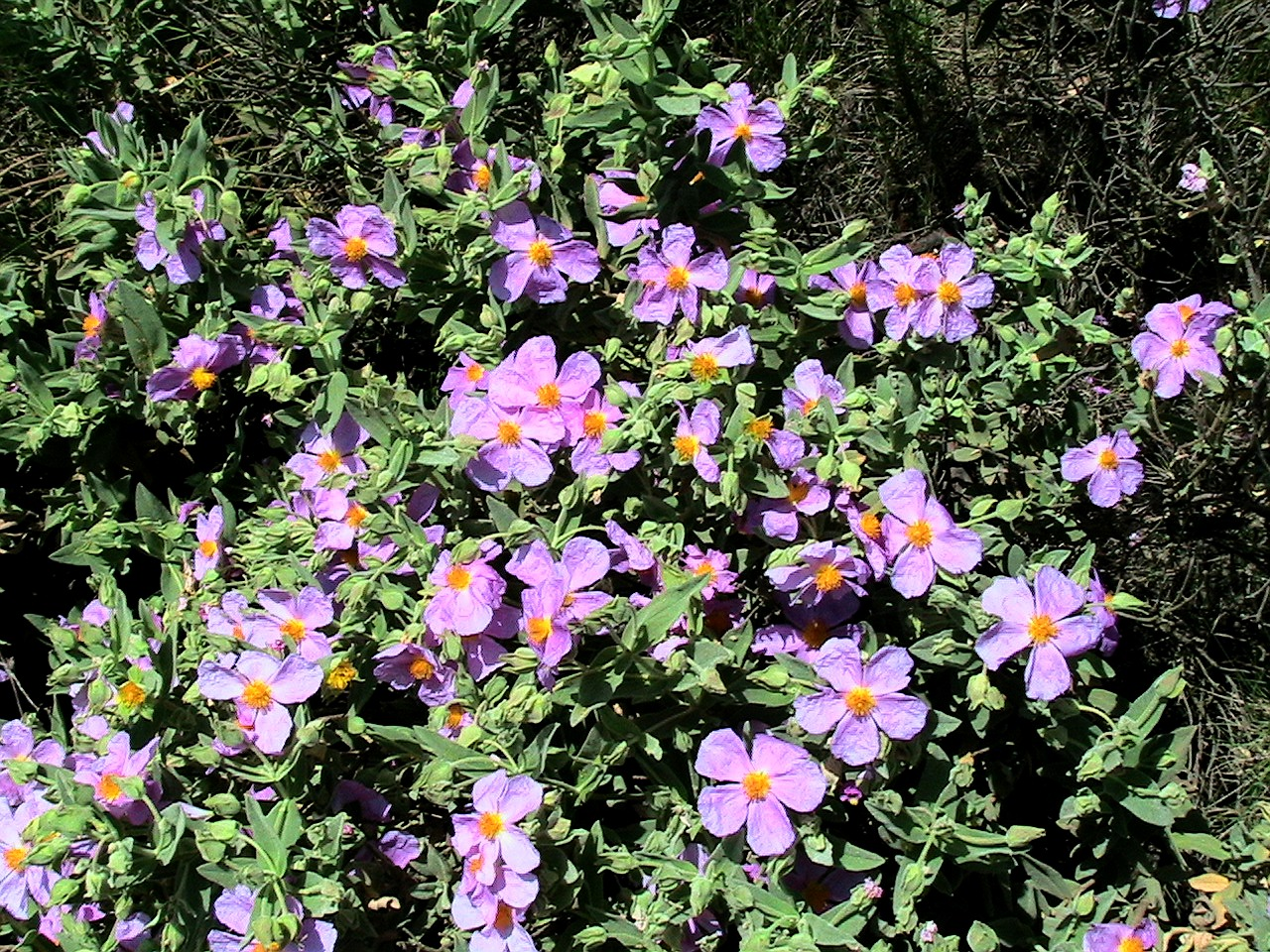

Scientific classification
- Kingdom: Plantae
- Clade: Embryophytes
- Clade: Tracheophytes
- Clade: Spermatophytes
- Clade: Angiosperms
- Clade: Eudicots
- Clade: Rosids
- Order: Malvales
- Family: Cistaceae
- Genus: Cistus
- Species: C. albidus

Binomial name
- Cistus albidus L.

= Cistus albidus =

Species of flowering plant

Cistus albidus, the grey-leaved cistus, is a shrubby species of flowering plant in the family Cistaceae, with pink to purple flowers, native to south-western Europe and western north Africa.

== Description ==
Cistus albidus grows up to 1 m (3 ft) tall. Its leaves are oblong to elliptical in shape, usually 2–5 cm (0.8–2.0 in) long by 0.5–2 cm (0.2–0.8 in) wide. They have three prominent veins and are densely covered with short hairs, producing a greyish-white appearance. The flowers are arranged in cymes of one to seven individual flowers, each 4–6 cm (1.6–2.4 in) across with five purple to pink petals and five sepals.

== Taxonomy and phylogeny ==
Cistus albidus was first described by Carl Linnaeus in 1753 in Species Plantarum (p. 524). The specific epithet albidus means "whitish", referring to the leaves and shoots.

A 2011 molecular phylogenetic study placed C. albidus as the sister to Cistus creticus in the purple and pink flowered clade (PPC) of Cistus species. C. creticus is found largely in the eastern Mediterranean, and the distributions of the two species show little overlap. They are able to hybridize, producing the fertile hybrid C. × canescens.

The sister group to both species is C. heterophyllus.

Species-level cladogram of Cistus species.

- - Halimium spp.
  - - Halimium spp.
    - - PPC
        - Cistus crispus
        - - - Cistus heterophyllus
            - - Cistus albidus
              - Cistus creticus
          - - Cistus asper
            - Cistus chinamadensis
            - Cistus horrens
            - Cistus ocreatus
            - Cistus osbeckiifolius
            - Cistus palmensis
            - Cistus symphytifolius
  - WWPC
    - - Cistus clusii
      - Cistus munbyi
    - - Cistus inflatus
      - Cistus ladanifer
      - Cistus laurifolius
      - Cistus libanotis
      - Cistus monspeliensis
      - Cistus parviflorus
      - Cistus populifolius
      - Cistus pouzolzii
      - Cistus salviifolius
      - Cistus sintenisii

Species-level cladogram of Cistus species, based on plastid and nuclear DNA sequences.

== Distribution ==
Cistus albidus is native to the west of Southern Europe and western North Africa, particularly around the Mediterranean, including Portugal, Spain, the Balearic Islands, France, Corsica, Italy, Sardinia, and Morocco.
