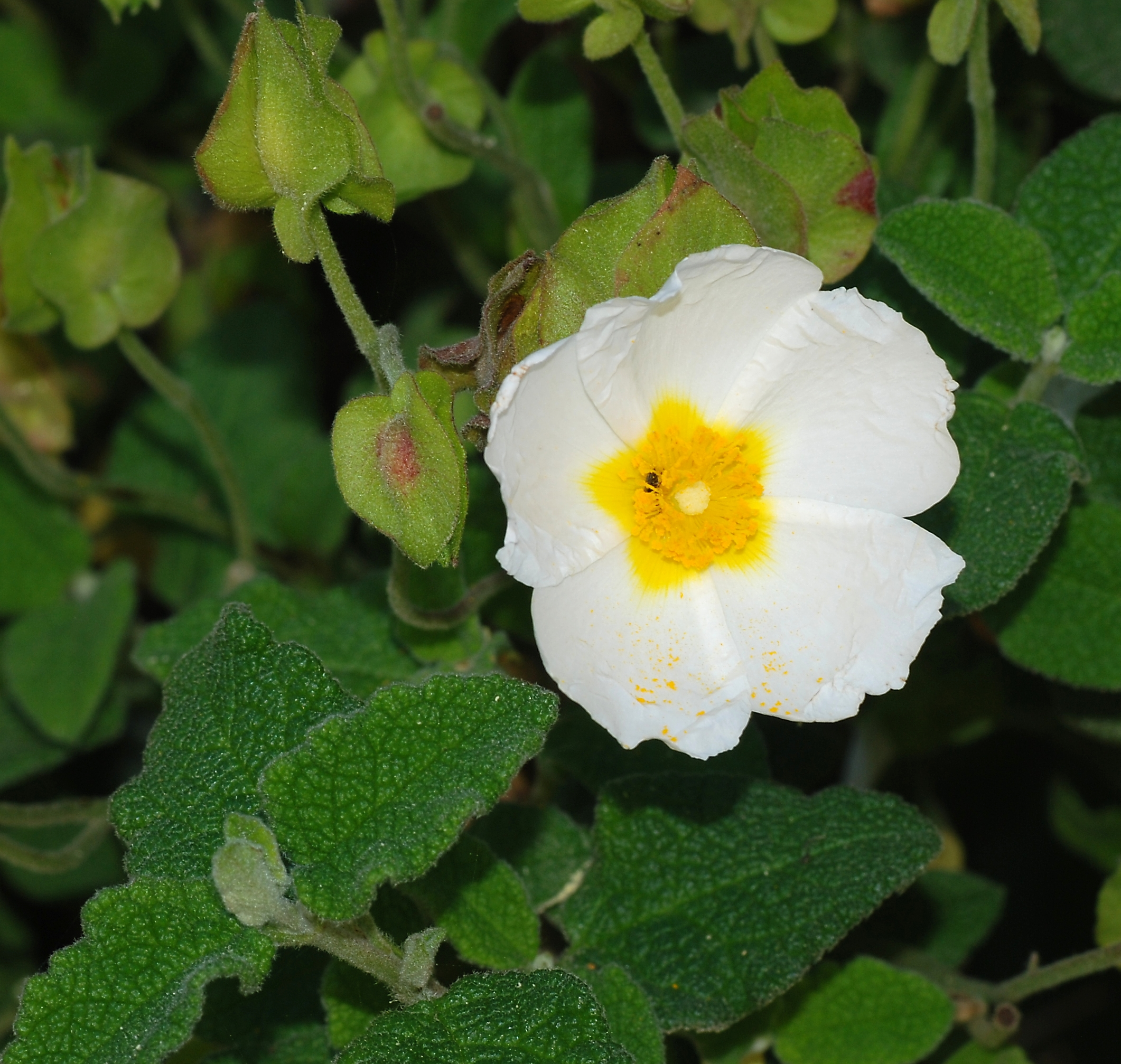

Scientific classification
- Kingdom: Plantae
- Clade: Tracheophytes
- Clade: Angiosperms
- Clade: Eudicots
- Clade: Rosids
- Order: Malvales
- Family: Cistaceae
- Genus: Cistus
- Species: C. salviifolius

Binomial name
- Cistus salviifolius L.

= Cistus salviifolius =

Species of flowering plant in the rock rose family

Cistus salviifolius, common names sage-leaved rock-rose, salvia cistus or Gallipoli rose, is a shrub of the family Cistaceae.

== Etymology ==
The genus name Cistus derives from the Ancient Greek words κίσθος (kisthos) meaning basket, while the species name salviifolius refers the wrinkled leaves similar to those of the sage.

== Description ==
Cistus salviifolius has spreading stems covered by clumpy hairs. This bushy shrub reaches on average 30–60 centimetres (12–24 in) in height, with a maximum of 100 centimetres (39 in). The oval-shaped green leaves are 1–4 cm (0.4–1.6 in) long, opposite, reticulate, tomentose on both sides, with a short petiole (2–4 mm).

The inflorescence holds one or more round flowers, long-stalked, arranged at the leaf axils. The five white petals have a yellow spot at the base, forming a corolla 4–6 cm (1.6–2.4 in) in diameter. The stamens are also yellow and the anthers shed abundant yellow pollen. This plant is pollinated by insects (entomophily), especially by bees. The flowering period extends from April through May. The fruit is a pentagonal capsule, 5–7 mm long.

== Phylogeny ==
Cistus salviifolius belongs to the white and whitish pink flowered clade of Cistus species.

Species-level cladogram of Cistus species.

- - Halimium spp.
  - - Halimium spp.
    - - PPC
        - Cistus crispus
        - - - Cistus heterophyllus
            - - Cistus albidus
              - Cistus creticus
          - - Cistus asper
            - Cistus chinamadensis
            - Cistus horrens
            - Cistus ocreatus
            - Cistus osbeckiifolius
            - Cistus palmensis
            - Cistus symphytifolius
  - WWPC
    - - Cistus clusii
      - Cistus munbyi
    - - Cistus inflatus
      - Cistus ladanifer
      - Cistus laurifolius
      - Cistus libanotis
      - Cistus monspeliensis
      - Cistus parviflorus
      - Cistus populifolius
      - Cistus pouzolzii
      - Cistus salviifolius
      - Cistus sintenisii

Species-level cladogram of Cistus species, based on plastid and nuclear DNA sequences.

== Gallery ==
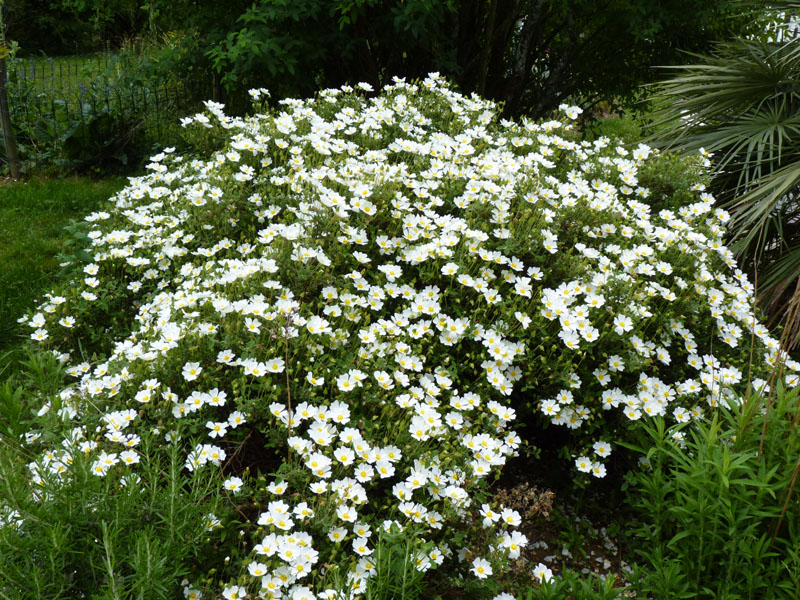
Plants of Cistus salviifolius

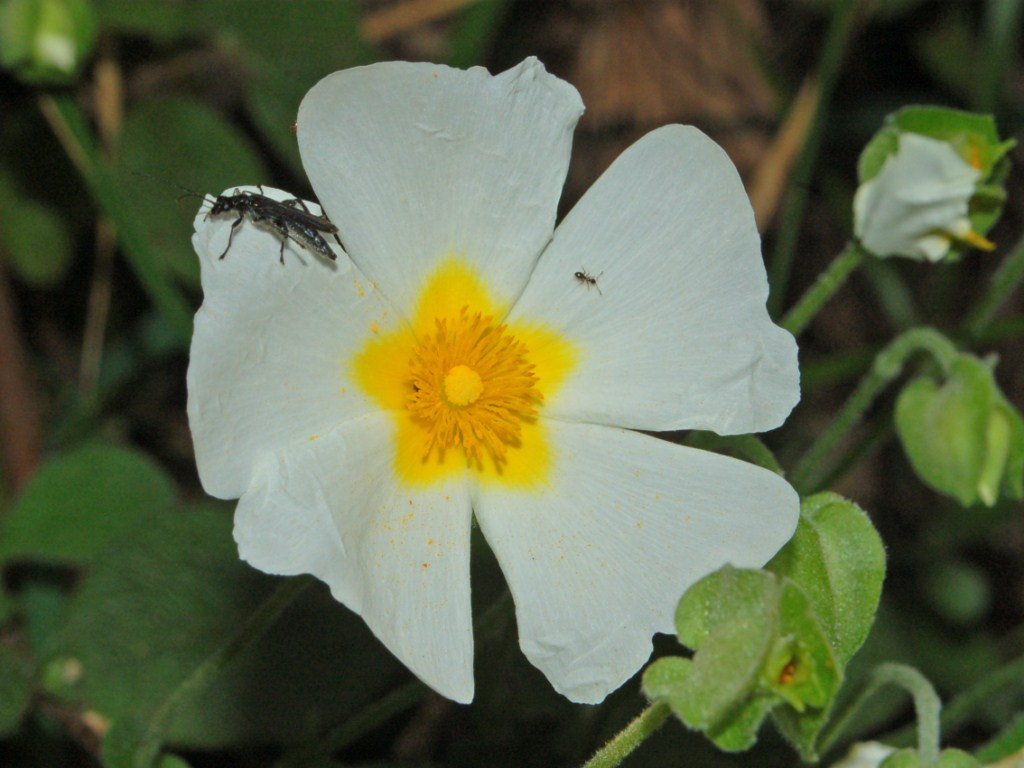
Close-up on a flower of Cistus salviifolius

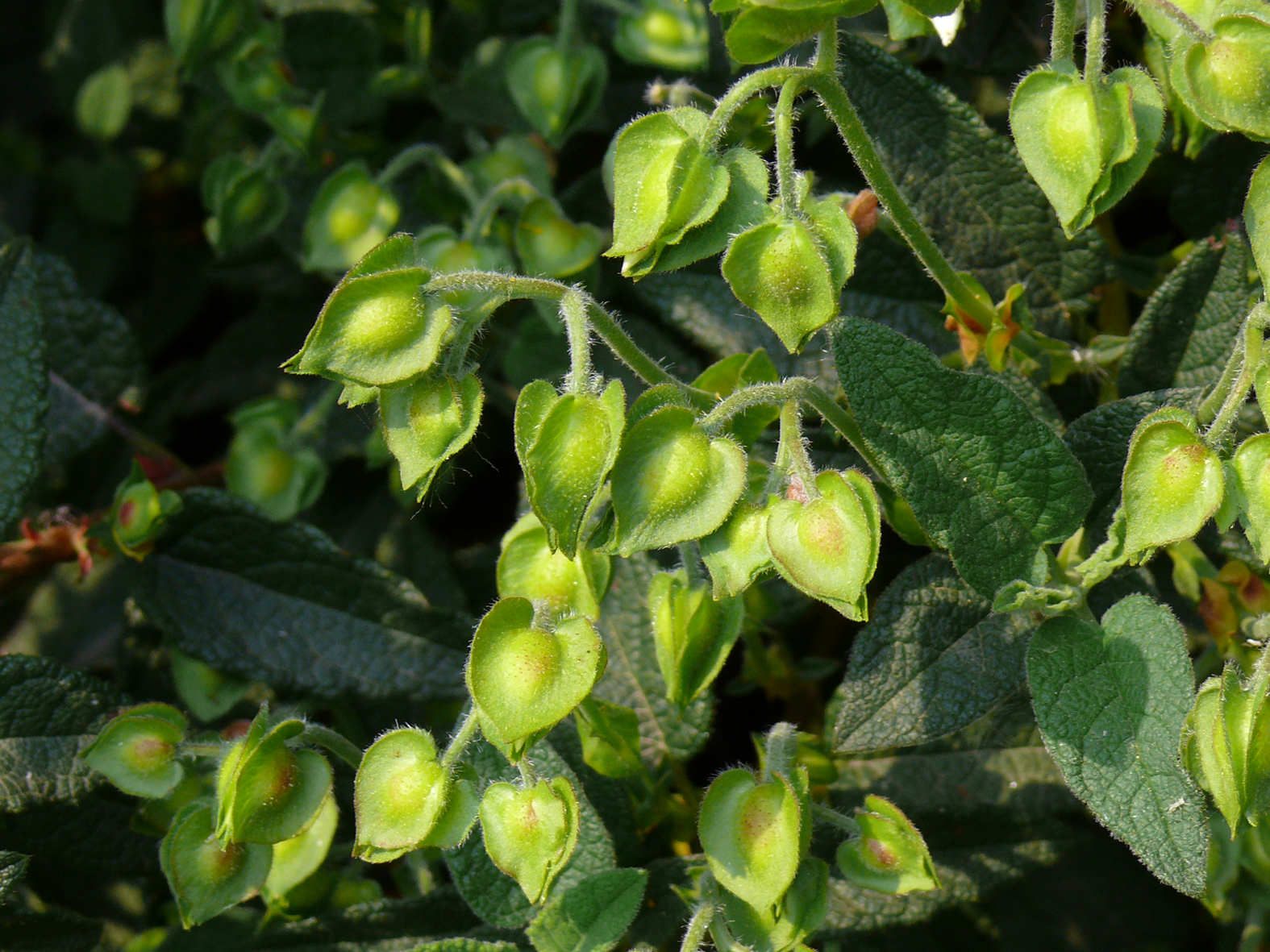
Fruits of Cistus salviifolius

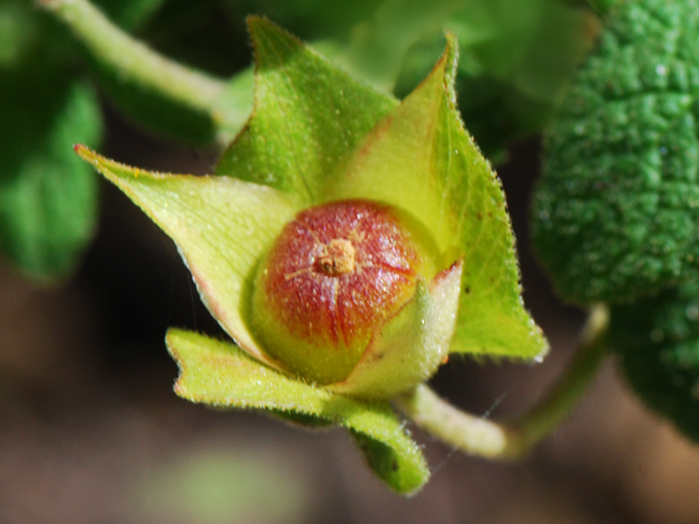
Close-up on a fruit of Cistus salviifolius

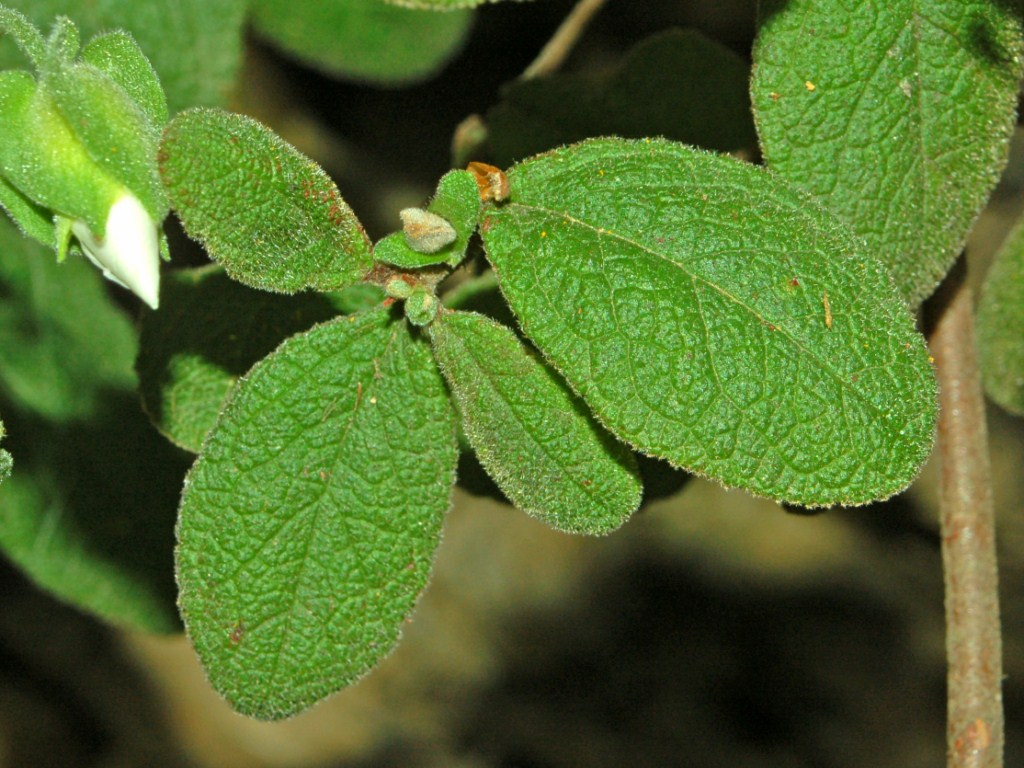
Leaves of Cistus salviifolius

== Cultivation ==
Cistus salviifolius cultivated in the nursery industry, and grown in gardens and public landscapes, often for its drought-tolerant and pollinator habitat attributes.

== Distribution ==
This showy wildflower is native to the Mediterranean region, in southern Europe and parts of Western Asia and North Africa.

== Habitat ==
This plant prefers dry hills, scrubland and open woodlands, at an altitude of 0–1,200 metres (0–3,937 ft) above sea level. It regrows very quickly following a fire.

== Synonyms ==
- Cistus macrocalyx Sennen & Pau
- Cistus paui Sennen
- Cistus salomonis Sennen & Malag.
- Cistus salviifolius [β] macrocalyx Willk.
- Cistus salviifolius [1] brevipedunculatus Willk.
- Cistus salviifolius [2] longipedunculatus Willk.
- Cistus salviifolius [alfa] vulgaris Willk.
- Cistus salviifolius [delta] biflorus Willk.
- Cistus salviifolius [epsilon] cymosus Willk.
- Cistus salviifolius [gamma] grandifolius Willk.
- Cistus salviifolius var. fissipetalus Sennen
- Cistus salviifolius var. occidentalis Rouy & Foucaud
- Cistus salviifolius var. rierae Sennen
- Cistus salviifolius var. schizocalyx Sennen
- Cistus salviifolius L.
- Ledonia peduncularis var. salviifolia (L.) Spach
- Ledonia peduncularis Spach

Other synonyms reported by The Plant List include:

- Cistus apricus Timb.-Lagr.
- Cistus arrigens Timb.-Lagr.
- Cistus elegans Timb.-Lagr.
- Cistus fruticans Timb.-Lagr.
- Cistus humilis Timb.-Lagr.
- Cistus microphyllus Timb.-Lagr.
- Cistus platyphyllus Timb.-Lagr.
- Cistus rhodanensis Timb.-Lagr.
- Cistus sideritis C.Presl
- Cistus velutinus Timb.-Lagr.

== Chemistry ==
Cistus salviifolius contains flavan-3ols, oligomeric proanthocyanidins and prodelphinidins such as epigallocatechin-3-O-(4-hydroxybenzoate), epigallocatechin-(4β→8)-epigallocatechin, epigallocatechin -3-O-gallate-(4β→8)-epigallocatechin, epigallocatechin-(4β→6)-epigallocatechin-3-O-gallate, 1-O-β-d -(6′-O-galloyl)-glucopyranosyl-3-methoxy-5-hydroxybenzene, epigallocatechin-(4β→8)-epigallocatechin-3-O-gallate, 1-O-β-d- glucopyranosyl-3-methoxy-5-hydroxybenzene and rhododendrin (betuloside). It also contains ellagitannins of the punicalagin type.
