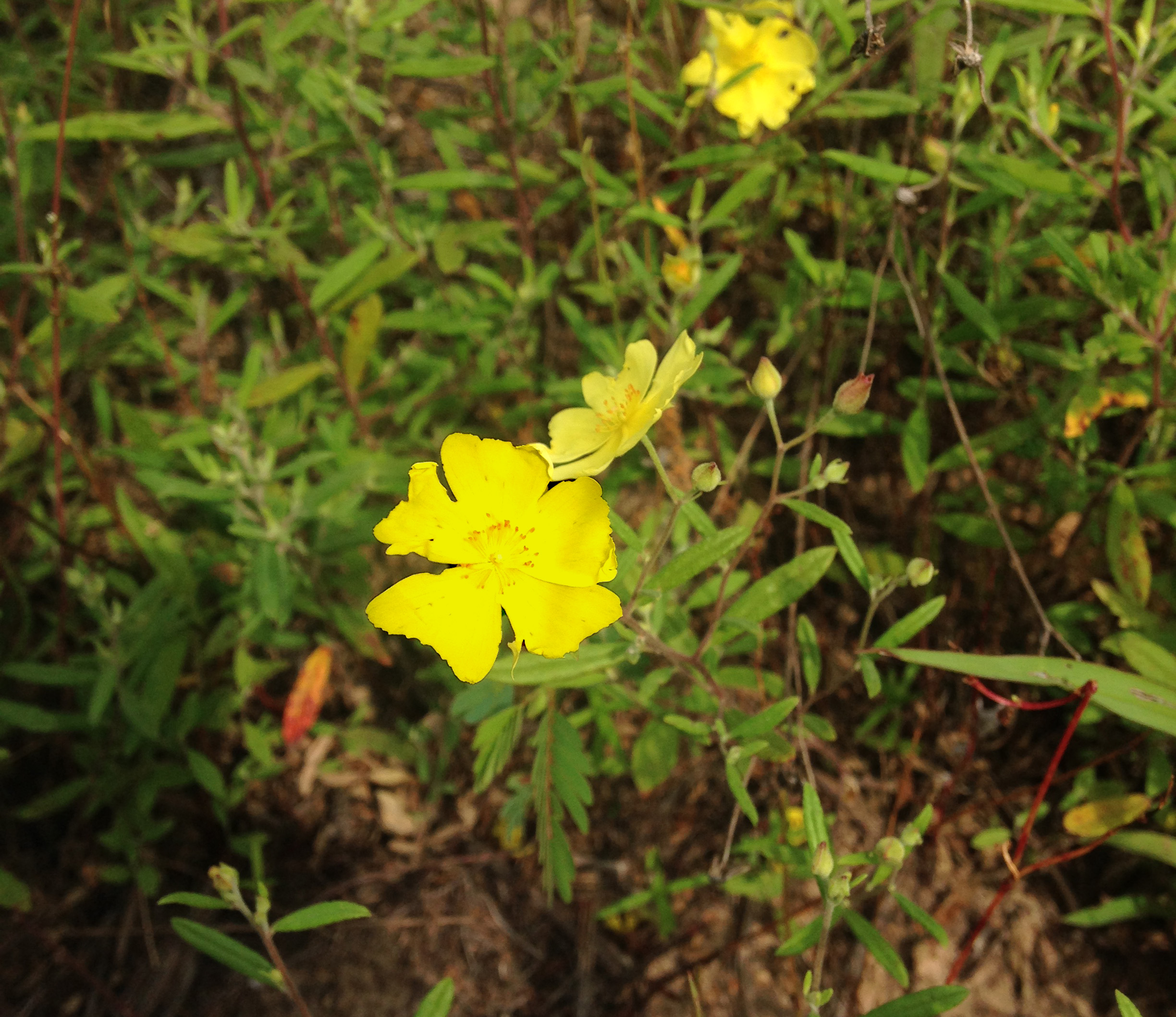
- Crocanthemum georgianum

Scientific classification
- Kingdom: Plantae
- Clade: Embryophytes
- Clade: Tracheophytes
- Clade: Spermatophytes
- Clade: Angiosperms
- Clade: Eudicots
- Clade: Rosids
- Order: Malvales
- Family: Cistaceae
- Genus: Crocanthemum; Spach (1836)

Species
- 20, see text

Synonyms
- Heteromeris Spach (1836); Trichasterophyllum Willd. ex Link (1820)

= Crocanthemum =

Genus of flowering plants

Crocanthemum is a genus of flowering plants in the family Cistaceae. They are native to both North and South America where they are widespread. The common name frostweed relates to the ice crystals which form from sap exuding from cracks near the base of the stem in the late fall.

Crocanthemum are herbaceous perennials or subshrubs with alternate leaves. With the exception of species in California, they generally produce two types of flowers: showy, yellow chasmogamous (cross-pollinated) produced earlier in the growing season, followed by cleistogamous (self-pollinated) flowers that are smaller and lack petals. All species of Crocanthemum are fire tolerant and are found in open habitats.

Although the genus was first named in 1836 to encompass New World species of Helianthemum, it generally went unrecognized by taxonomists and its species were included in a broad concept of Helianthemum throughout much of the 1800s and 1900s. However, phylogenetic studies in 2004 and 2009 indicated that the New World species of Helianthemum were more closely related to Hudsonia than Old World Helianthemum. This required the resurrection of the genus Crocanthemum in order to maintain monophyly.

== Species ==
20 species are accepted.

- Crocanthemum aldersonii (Greene) Janch.
- Crocanthemum arenicola (Chapm.) Barnhart
- Crocanthemum argenteum (Hemsl.) Janch.
- Crocanthemum bicknellii (Fernald) Janch.
- Crocanthemum brasiliense (Lam.) Spach
- Crocanthemum canadense (L.) Britton
- Crocanthemum carolinianum (Walter) Spach
- Crocanthemum corymbosum (Michx.) Britton
- Crocanthemum dumosum E.P.Bicknell
- Crocanthemum georgianum (Chapm.) Barnhart
- Crocanthemum glomeratum (Lag.) Janch.
- Crocanthemum greenei (B.L.Rob.) Sorrie
- Crocanthemum nashii (Britton) Barnhart
- Crocanthemum nutans (Brandegee) Janch.
- Crocanthemum pringlei (S.Watson) Janch.
- Crocanthemum propinquum (E.P.Bicknell) E.P.Bicknell
- Crocanthemum rosmarinifolium (Pursh) Janch.
- Crocanthemum scoparium (Nutt.) Millsp.
- Crocanthemum suffrutescens (B.Schreib.) Sorrie
