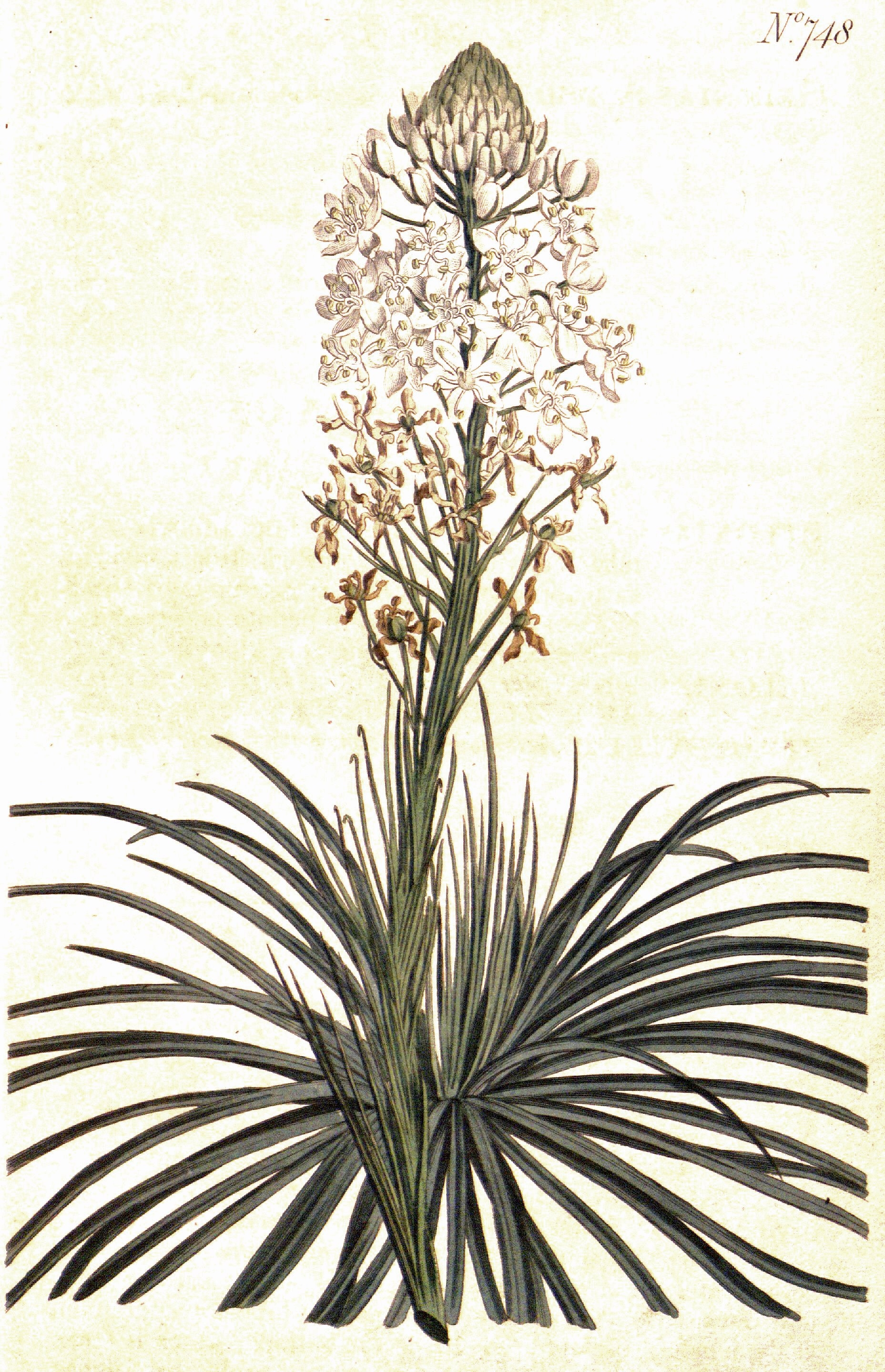
- 1804 illustration

Conservation status
- Apparently Secure (NatureServe)

Scientific classification
- Kingdom: Plantae
- Clade: Tracheophytes
- Clade: Angiosperms
- Clade: Monocots
- Order: Liliales
- Family: Melanthiaceae
- Genus: Xerophyllum
- Species: X. asphodeloides

Binomial name
- Xerophyllum asphodeloides (L.) Nutt.

Synonyms
- Helonias asphodeloides L.; Helonias tenuifolia Salisb.; Xerophyllum setifolium Michx.

= Xerophyllum asphodeloides =

Species of flowering plant

Xerophyllum asphodeloides is a North American species of flowering plants in the Melanthiaceae known by the common names turkey beard, eastern turkeybeard, beartongue, grass-leaved helonias, and mountain asphodel. It is native to the eastern United States, where it occurs in the southern Appalachian Mountains from Virginia to Alabama, and also in the Pine Barrens of New Jersey.

This species is a rhizomatous perennial herb growing up to 1.5 meters tall. The leaves are threadlike to linear and have serrated edges. They grow up to 50 centimeters long. The inflorescence is a long raceme of flowers with six cream-white tepals. The fruit is a capsule.

Associated species may include Quercus prinus (chestnut oak), Quercus marilandica (blackjack oak), Pinus echinata (shortleaf pine), Quercus stellata (post oak), Sassafras albidum (sassafras), Pinus rigida (pitch pine), Aster dumosus (aster), Aster paternus (white-topped aster), Cypripedium acaule (pink lady's-slipper), Polygonella articulata (jointweed), Solidago odora var. odora (sweet goldenrod), Solidago puberula var. puberula (goldenrod), Trichostema dichotomum (blue curls), Gaylussacia baccata (black huckleberry), Hudsonia ericoides (golden heather), Hudsonia montana (mountain heather), Ilex glabra (inkberry), Kalmia angustifolia (sheep laurel), Leiophyllum buxifolium (sand myrtle), Lyonia mariana (staggerbush), Myrica caroliniensis (bayberry), Pyxidanthera barbulata (pyxie-moss), Quercus ilicifolia (bear oak), Rhus copallinum (winged sumac), Vaccinium corymbosum (highbush blueberry), and Vaccinium pallidum (hillside blueberry).

The plant is most common in New Jersey and Virginia. It is less common throughout the rest of its range. It is threatened by the loss and fragmentation of its habitat and fire suppression.
