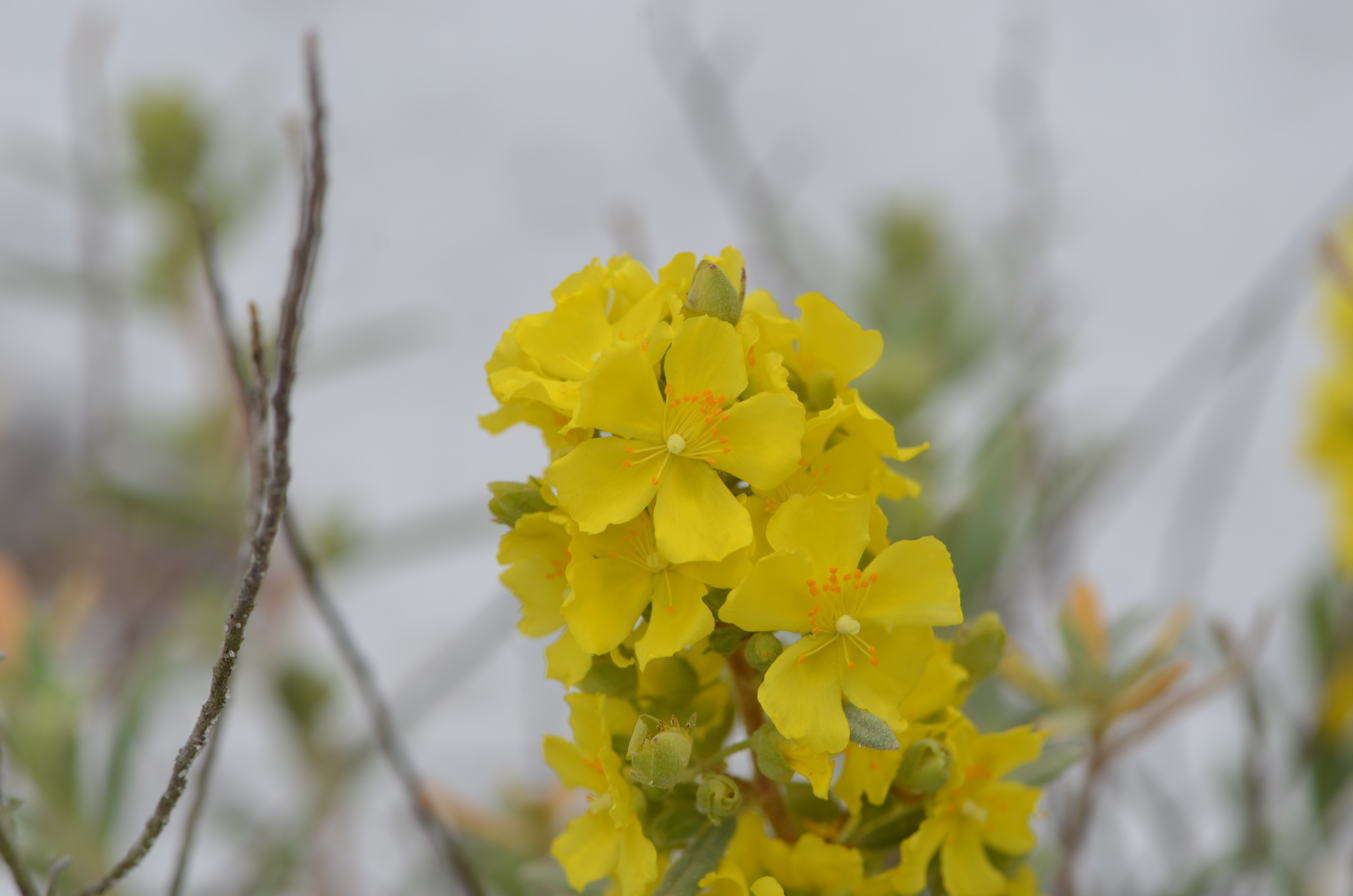

Conservation status
- Vulnerable (NatureServe)

Scientific classification
- Kingdom: Plantae
- Clade: Tracheophytes
- Clade: Angiosperms
- Clade: Eudicots
- Clade: Rosids
- Order: Malvales
- Family: Cistaceae
- Genus: Crocanthemum
- Species: C. nashii

Binomial name
- Crocanthemum nashii (Britton) Barnhart

= Crocanthemum nashii =

Species of plant

Crocanthemum nashii (commonly called Florida scrub sunrose, Nash's sunrose, and Florida scrub frostweed) is a species of plant endemic to the U.S. southeast coastal plain from Florida, where it is most common, to North Carolina.

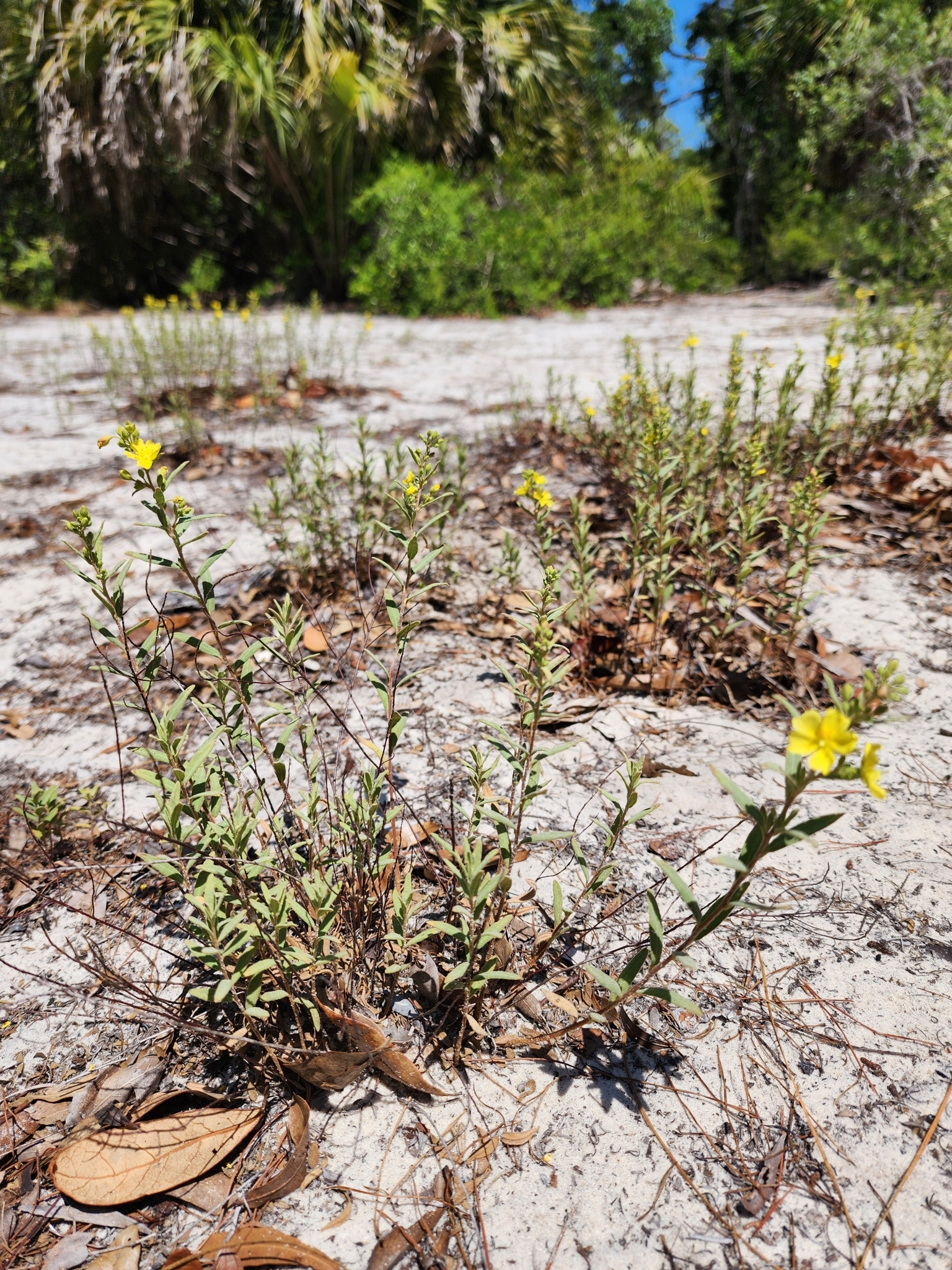
Blooming in remnant of white sand scrub

== Habitat ==
This species belongs to the deep-sanded, fire-dependent habitats of Florida scrub and xeric pine sandhill.

== Range ==
It was once thought to be endemic only to Florida but recent analysis of crowd-sourced photographic evidence and herbarium specimens has shown its range to extend further north. There are an estimated 100 to 200 populations in Florida, 8 in South Carolina, 5 in North Carolina, and 2 in Georgia.

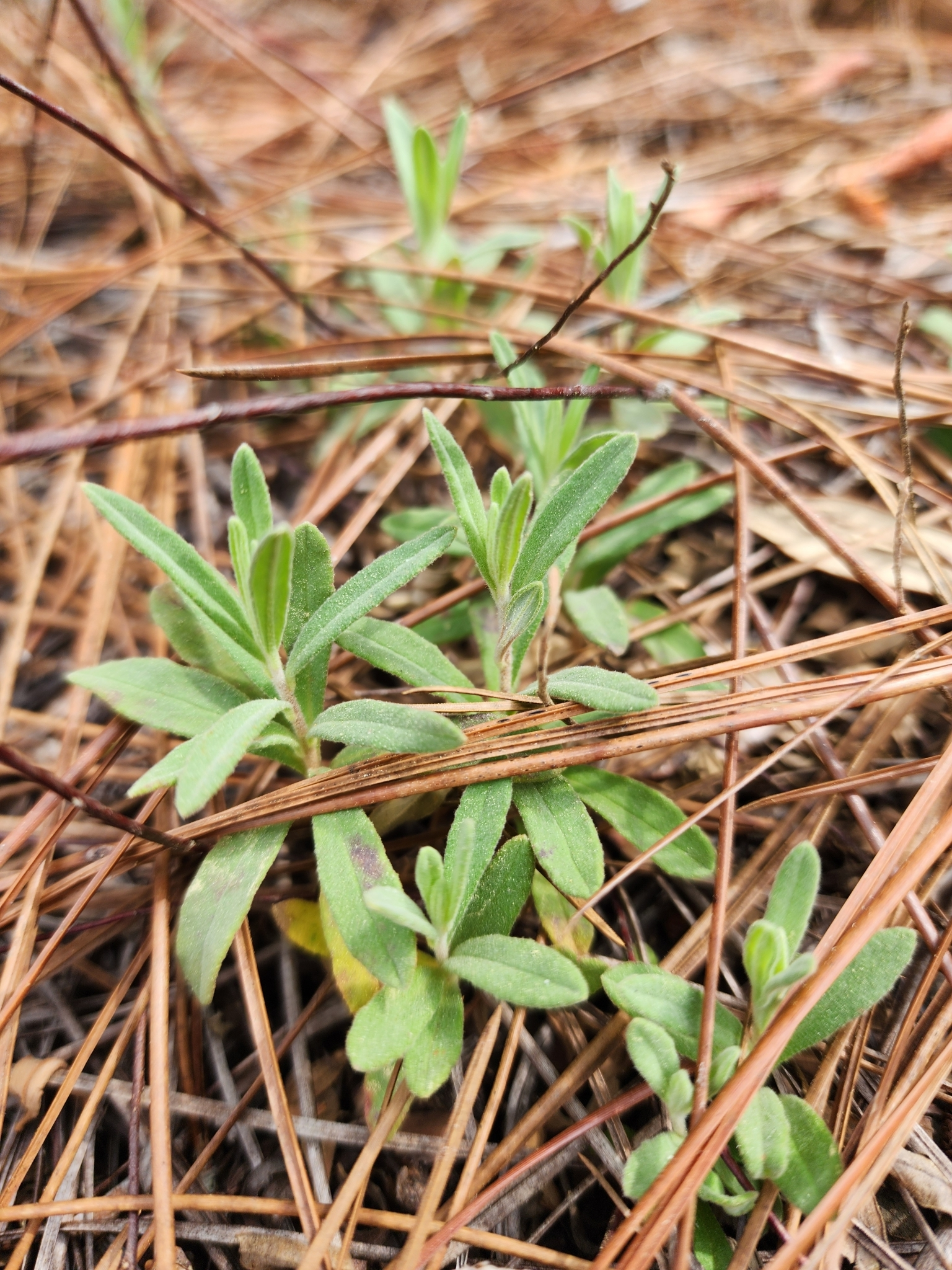
Sprouting up through pine duff in fire-suppressed scrub

== Conservation ==
Due to its specific habitat requirements, the species is threatened by habitat loss and fragmentation due to wildfire suppression and development for real estate and agriculture.

It is state listed S3 (vulnerable) in Florida and S1 (critically imperiled) in North Carolina, South Carolina, and Georgia.
