= Fumana laevipes =

Scientific classification
- Kingdom: Plantae
- Clade: Embryophytes
- Clade: Tracheophytes
- Clade: Spermatophytes
- Clade: Angiosperms
- Clade: Eudicots
- Clade: Rosids
- Order: Malvales
- Family: Cistaceae
- Genus: Fumana
- Species: F. laevipes

Binomial name
- Fumana laevipes (L.) Spach

Synonyms
- Cistus laevipes

Species of plant

Fumana laevipes is a species of shrub in the family Cistaceae. They have a self-supporting growth form, simple, broad leaves and dry fruit. Individuals can grow to 10 cm tall.

== Sources ==
This article incorporates text from a free content work. Licensed under CC0 (license statement/permission). Text taken from Fumana laevipes. Encyclopedia of Life.
