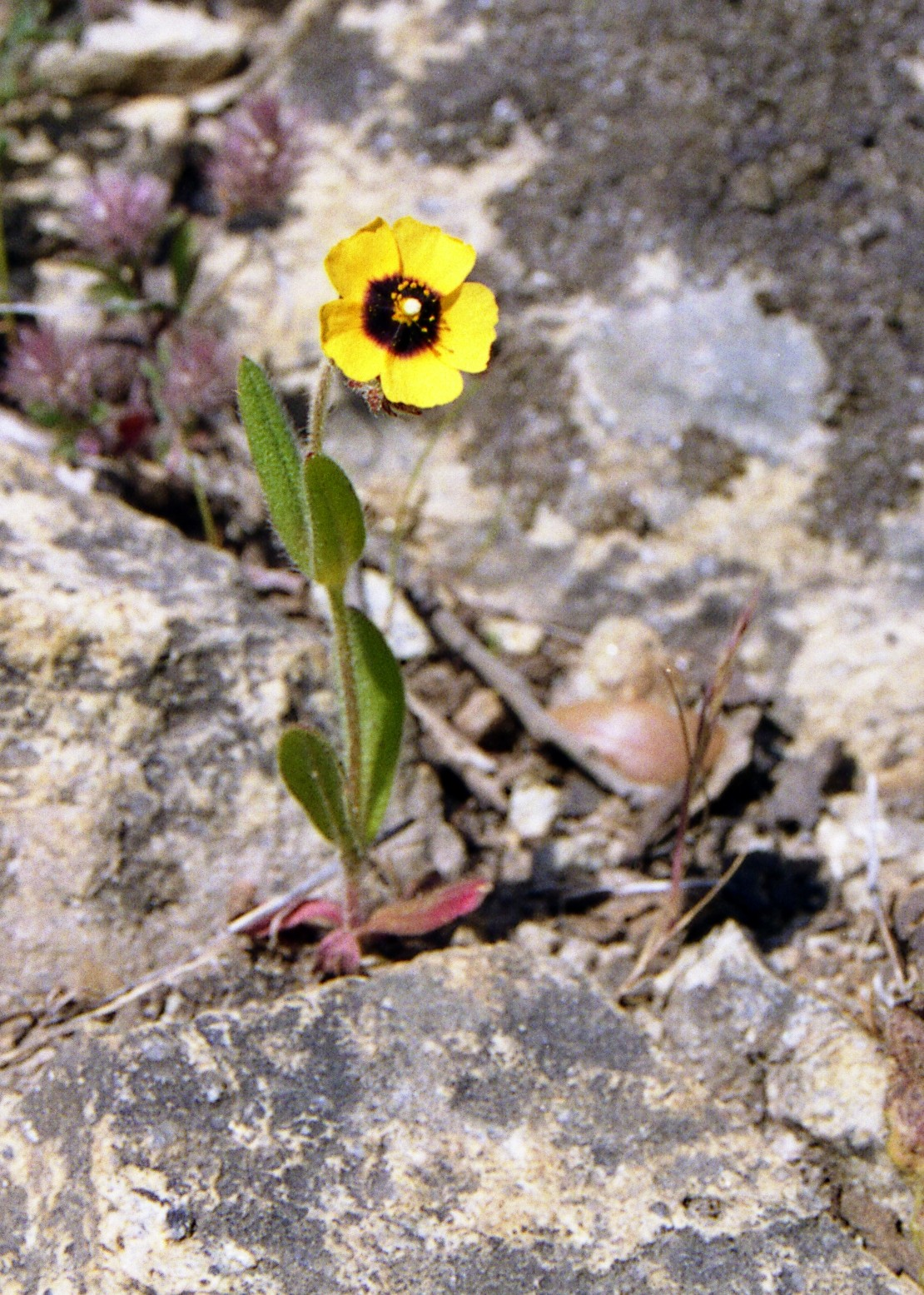

Scientific classification
- Kingdom: Plantae
- Clade: Embryophytes
- Clade: Tracheophytes
- Clade: Spermatophytes
- Clade: Angiosperms
- Clade: Eudicots
- Clade: Rosids
- Order: Malvales
- Family: Cistaceae
- Genus: Tuberaria
- Species: T. guttata

Binomial name
- Tuberaria guttata (L.) Fourr.

Synonyms
- Cistus cistifolius Steud.; Cistus foetidus Jacq.; Cistus guttatus L.; Cistus immaculatum Steud.; Cistus inconspicuus (Thiéb.-Bern. ex Pers.) Poir.; Cistus lanceolatus Vahl; Cistus obscurus Steud.; Cistus ovatus Viv.; Cistus piluliferus Thibaud ex Dunal; Cistus racemosus L.; Cistus roseus Jacq.; Cistus sampsucifolius Sims; Cistus serratifolius Lamb. ex Dunal; Cistus serratus Cav.; Cistus splendens Lam.; Cistus sulphureus Steud.; Cistus teretifolius Thibaud ex Dunal; Helianthemum breweri Planch.; Helianthemum guttatum (L.) Mill.; Helianthemum inconspicuum Thiéb.-Bern. ex Pers.; Helianthemum variabile Spach; Therocistus gutatus (L.) Holub; Therocistus inconspicuus (Thiéb.-Bern. ex Pers.) Holub; Tuberaria inconspicua (Thiéb.-Bern. ex Pers.) Willk.; Tuberaria variabilis (Spach) Willk.; Xolanthes guttatus (L.) Raf.

= Tuberaria guttata =

Species of flowering plant

Tuberaria guttata, the spotted rock-rose or annual rock-rose, is an annual plant of the Mediterranean region which also occurs very locally in Wales and Ireland. The flowers are very variable with the characteristic spot at the base of the petal very variable in size and intensity of colour.

== Description ==
Tuberaria guttata is an annual plant that grows to 2–30 centimetres (1–12 in) tall. It has a rosette of basal leaves, each up to 3 cm (1.2 in) long and 1.5 cm (0.6 in) wide, but this rosette has normally withered by the time the plant is in flower. The stems bear 2–5 opposite pairs of leaves, and a few smaller leaves higher up, arranged alternately.

The inflorescence comprises around 12 flowers, 8–12 mm (0.31–0.47 in) in diameter. Each flower has five uneven sepals and five yellow petals usually with a dark red spot near the base. The flowers are cleistogamous, producing little pollen and no nectar, and attracting few insect visitors, and the petals fall off after only a few hours. The centre of the flower houses around 20 stamens and a single capitate stigma.

The fruit of T. guttata is a capsule containing many seeds, each 0.6 millimetres (0.024 in) long.

== Distribution and ecology ==
Tuberaria guttata is widely distributed in the Mediterranean region, and has a continuous distribution along the French Atlantic coast as far as the Channel Islands. Further north, its distribution is very patchy, being confined to a few localities on the west coasts of Ireland and Wales. The best-known of these populations is on the slopes of Holyhead Mountain in Anglesey. These British populations mark the northernmost limit of the species' distribution. Tuberaria guttata was chosen by Plantlife as the county flower of Anglesey in 2002.

In California, T. guttata has become naturalised in the foothills of the Sierra Nevada on the eastern edge of the Sacramento Valley.

In the Mediterranean region, T. guttata is common in arid habitats from woodlands to grasslands and roadsides. In the British Isles, it grows "in bare patches of thin, dry soil overlying hard igneous rock in open areas within wind-cut heath near the sea".

== Taxonomy ==
Tuberaria guttata was first described by Carl Linnaeus as "Cistus guttatus" in his 1753 work Species Plantarum. It was transferred to the genus Tuberaria by Jules Pierre Fourreau in 1868.

The Welsh populations were described as a separate species in 1844 by Jules Émile Planchon. He named the plants "Helianthemum breweri", after Samuel Brewer, who had discovered the population in 1726. This is now considered a synonym of T. guttata.
