= Fumana aciphylla =

Scientific classification
- Kingdom: Plantae
- Clade: Embryophytes
- Clade: Tracheophytes
- Clade: Spermatophytes
- Clade: Angiosperms
- Clade: Eudicots
- Clade: Rosids
- Order: Malvales
- Family: Cistaceae
- Genus: Fumana
- Species: F. aciphylla

Binomial name
- Fumana aciphylla Boiss

Species of plant

Fumana aciphylla is a species of shrub in the genus Fumana and in the family Cistaceae. It can be found in Bulgaria, Turkey and Greece. It prefers dry calcareous hills and steppes.
