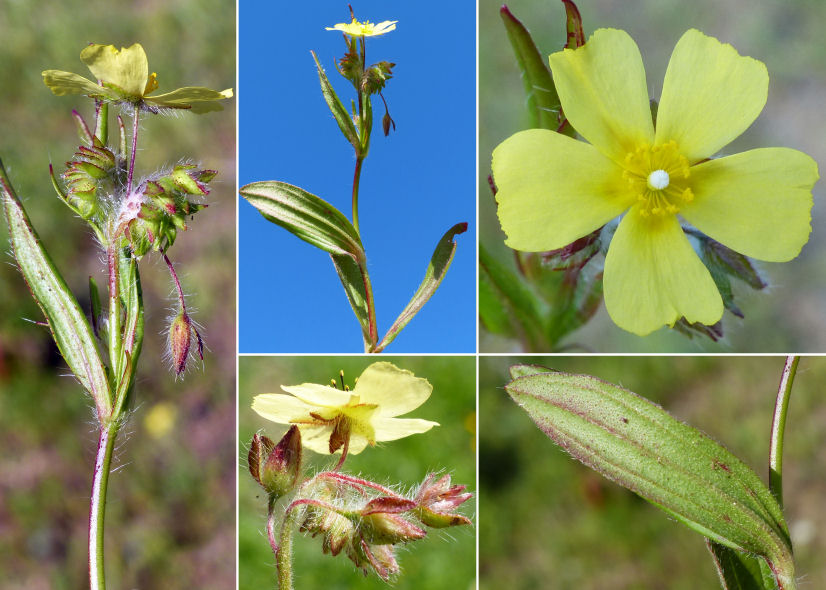

Scientific classification
- Kingdom: Plantae
- Clade: Tracheophytes
- Clade: Angiosperms
- Clade: Eudicots
- Clade: Rosids
- Order: Malvales
- Family: Cistaceae
- Genus: Tuberaria
- Species: T. lignosa

Binomial name
- Tuberaria lignosa (Sweet) Samp.

Synonyms
- Cistus nervosus Lam.; Cistus plantaginifolius Salisb.; Cistus tuberaria L.; Helianthemon tuberarium St.-Lag.; Helianthemum lignosum Sweet; Helianthemum tuberaria (L.) Mill.; Tuberaria melastomatifolia Grosser; Tuberaria vulgaris Willk.; Xolantha tuberaria (L.) M.J.Gallego, Muñoz Garm. & C.Navarro

= Tuberaria lignosa =

Species of flowering plant

Tuberaria lignosa is a species of perennial rock-rose native to the western Mediterranean region.

== Description ==
Tuberaria lignosa is a perennial herb, often woody towards the base. It reaches a height of 57 centimetres (22 in) and branches freely. Its leaves are simple, 3–10 cm (1–4 in) long and 0.9–3.4 cm (0.4–1.3 in) wide. The inflorescence is lax, with each flower 2–3 cm (0.8–1.2 in) in diameter.

== Distribution and ecology ==
Tuberaria lignosa is found around the western Mediterranean Basin, in parts of Italy, France, mainland Spain, Portugal, Morocco, Tunisia, Algeria and the Canary Islands.

== Taxonomy ==
The species was first described by Carl Linnaeus in his 1753 work Species Plantarum, as Cistus tuberaria. It was later transferred to the genus Helianthemum, and when Michel Félix Dunal erected Helianthemum sect. Tuberaria in 1824, he designated Helianthemum tuberaria as its type species. In 1827, Robert Sweet published a description of Helianthemum lignosum, but this name was invalid as a junior synonym of H. tuberaria. In 1836, Édouard Spach raised this subgenus to the rank of genus as Tuberaria; because the International Code of Nomenclature for algae, fungi, and plants forbids tautonyms (such as "Tuberaria tuberaria"), the next oldest available name has to be used. In 1922, Gonçalo Sampaio introduced the combination Tuberaria lignosa, which is the name generally used today. Some botanists consider the species part of the genus Xolantha, in which case it is known as Xolantha tuberaria.

== Medical research ==
The plant has been researched for medical purposes in cancer treatment. An aqueous extract of Tuberaria lignosa inhibited cell growth, altered the cell cycle profile, and induced apoptosis of NCI-H460 tumour cells.
