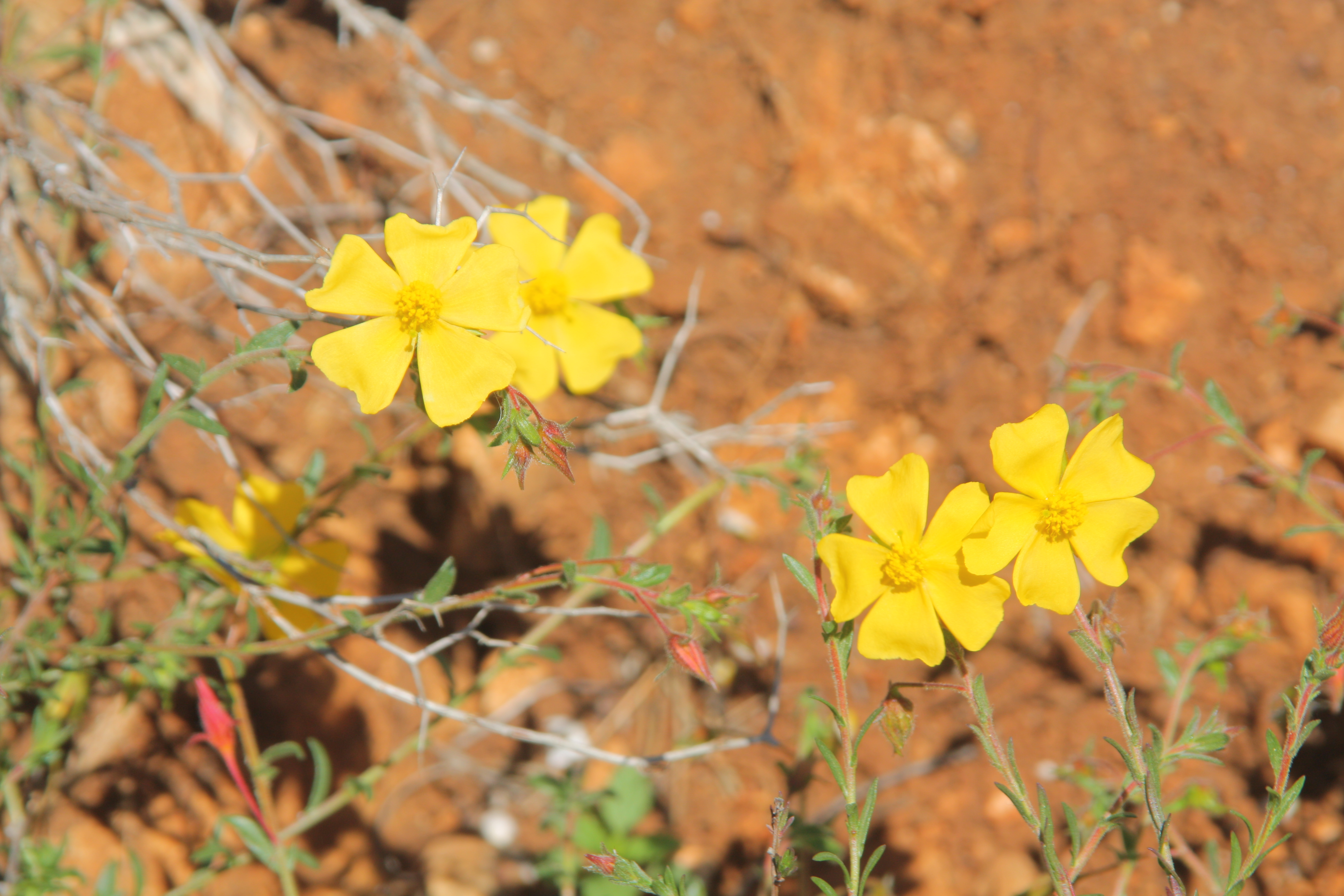

Scientific classification
- Kingdom: Plantae
- Clade: Tracheophytes
- Clade: Angiosperms
- Clade: Eudicots
- Clade: Rosids
- Order: Malvales
- Family: Cistaceae
- Genus: Fumana
- Species: F. arabica

Binomial name
- Fumana arabica (L.) Spach

Synonyms
- Helianthemum arabicum

= Fumana arabica =

Species of plant

Fumana arabica is a species of shrub in the family Cistaceae. They have a self-supporting growth form and simple, broad leaves and dry fruit. Individuals can grow to 22 cm tall.

== Sources ==
This article incorporates text from a free content work. Licensed under CC0 (license statement/permission). Text taken from Fumana arabica. Encyclopedia of Life.
