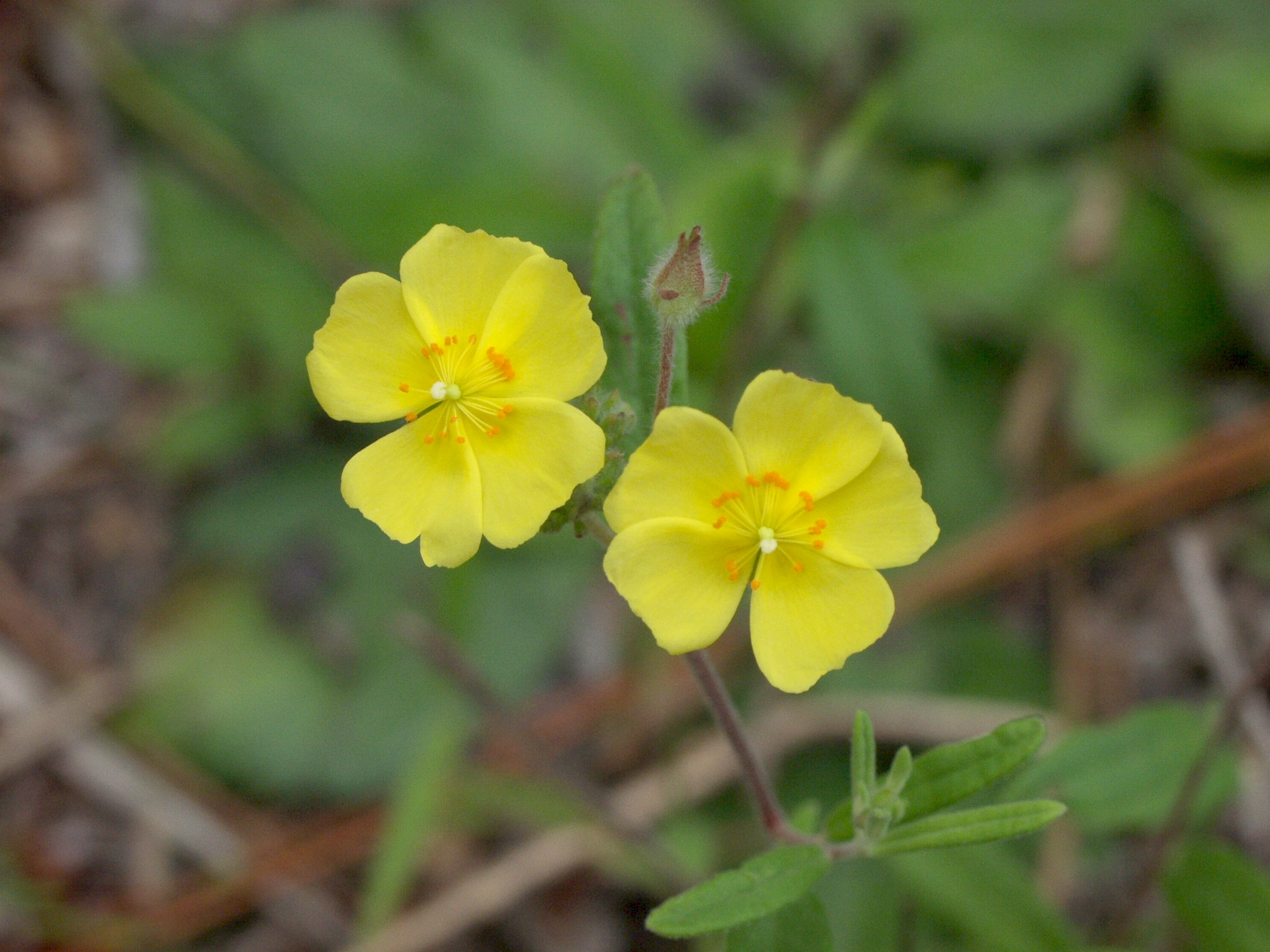

Conservation status
- Apparently Secure (NatureServe)

Scientific classification
- Kingdom: Plantae
- Clade: Tracheophytes
- Clade: Angiosperms
- Clade: Eudicots
- Clade: Rosids
- Order: Malvales
- Family: Cistaceae
- Genus: Crocanthemum
- Species: C. corymbosum

Binomial name
- Crocanthemum corymbosum (Michx.) Britton

= Crocanthemum corymbosum =

Species of flowering plant

Crocanthemum corymbosum, commonly called pine barren frostweed, is a species of perennial herb or subshrub endemic to the U.S. southeast coastal plain in the states of Florida, Georgia, Alabama, South Carolina, North Carolina, and Mississippi.

== Habitat ==
It occurs in sandy, fire-dependent habitats of the southeast including sandhill, dry flatwoods, and scrub.

== Conservation ==
Due to its restricted habitat requirements and known range, it is considered near-threatened species globally, and vulnerable in MS and critically imperiled in NC.

This species is threatened by fire suppression as its lifecycle depends on fire being present in the landscape. It produces seeds during its growing period, after which the seeds lie in wait encased in a water-resistant coating until exposed to fire, which then allows them begin to germinate.
