= Hibbertia fumana =

Conservation status
- Critically Endangered (NSWBCA)

Scientific classification
- Kingdom: Plantae
- Clade: Tracheophytes
- Clade: Angiosperms
- Clade: Eudicots
- Order: Dilleniales
- Family: Dilleniaceae
- Genus: Hibbertia
- Species: H. fumana

Binomial name
- Hibbertia fumana Sieber ex Toelken

Synonyms
- Hibbertia stricta var. glabriuscula Benth. p.p.; Pleurandra fumana Benth. nom. inval., pro syn.

Species of flowering plant

Hibbertia fumana is a species of flowering plant in the family Dilleniaceae and is endemic to New South Wales. It is a low-lying to prostrate shrublet with narrow oblong leaves and yellow flowers with five to seven stamens arranged in a single cluster on one side of two hairy carpels. When first formally described in 2012 it was thought to be extinct, but small populations have since been found in the Sydney region.

== Description ==
Hibbertia fumana is a low-lying to prostrate shrub or shrublet that typically grows to a height of up to 20 cm (7.9 in) and has wiry branches. The leaves are usually narrow oblong, 2.1–3.1 mm (0.083–0.122 in) long and 0.5–0.8 mm (0.020–0.031 in) wide on a petiole 0.2–0.45 mm (0.0079–0.0177 in) long and with the edges rolled under. The flowers are arranged singly on the ends of branches on a peduncle 2–8 mm (0.079–0.315 in) long with linear to triangular bracts 1.0–1.3 mm (0.039–0.051 in) long. The sepals are joined at the base and 4.5–5.7 mm (0.18–0.22 in) long, the outer lobes lance-shaped and the inner lobes egg-shaped. The petals are yellow, egg-shaped with the narrower end towards the base, 4–5.2 mm (0.16–0.20 in) long with two lobes. There are five to seven stamens in a single cluster on one side of the two hairy carpels.

== Taxonomy ==
Hibbertia fumana was first formally described in 2012 by Hellmut R. Toelken in the Journal of the Adelaide Botanic Gardens from specimens collected before 1824 by Franz Sieber, George Caley and Robert Brown "near Sydney", in Western Sydney and "near South Head". The specific epithet (fumana) was used on the labels on the specimens collected by Sieber, and refers to the similarity of the hairy, linear leaves to those of plants in the genus Fumana.

== Distribution and habitat ==
When first formally described in 2012, H. fumana was considered to be extinct but was rediscovered in October 2016 in Moorebank and subsequently found in a range extending from Richmond to Mittagong. It grows in a range of habitats including open areas, disturbed sites and with sedges, rushes and grasses.

== Conservation status ==
This hibbertia is listed as "critically endangered" under the New South Wales Government Biodiversity Conservation Act 2016. The main threats to the species include inappropriate fire regimes, weed invasion and the species' small population size.
