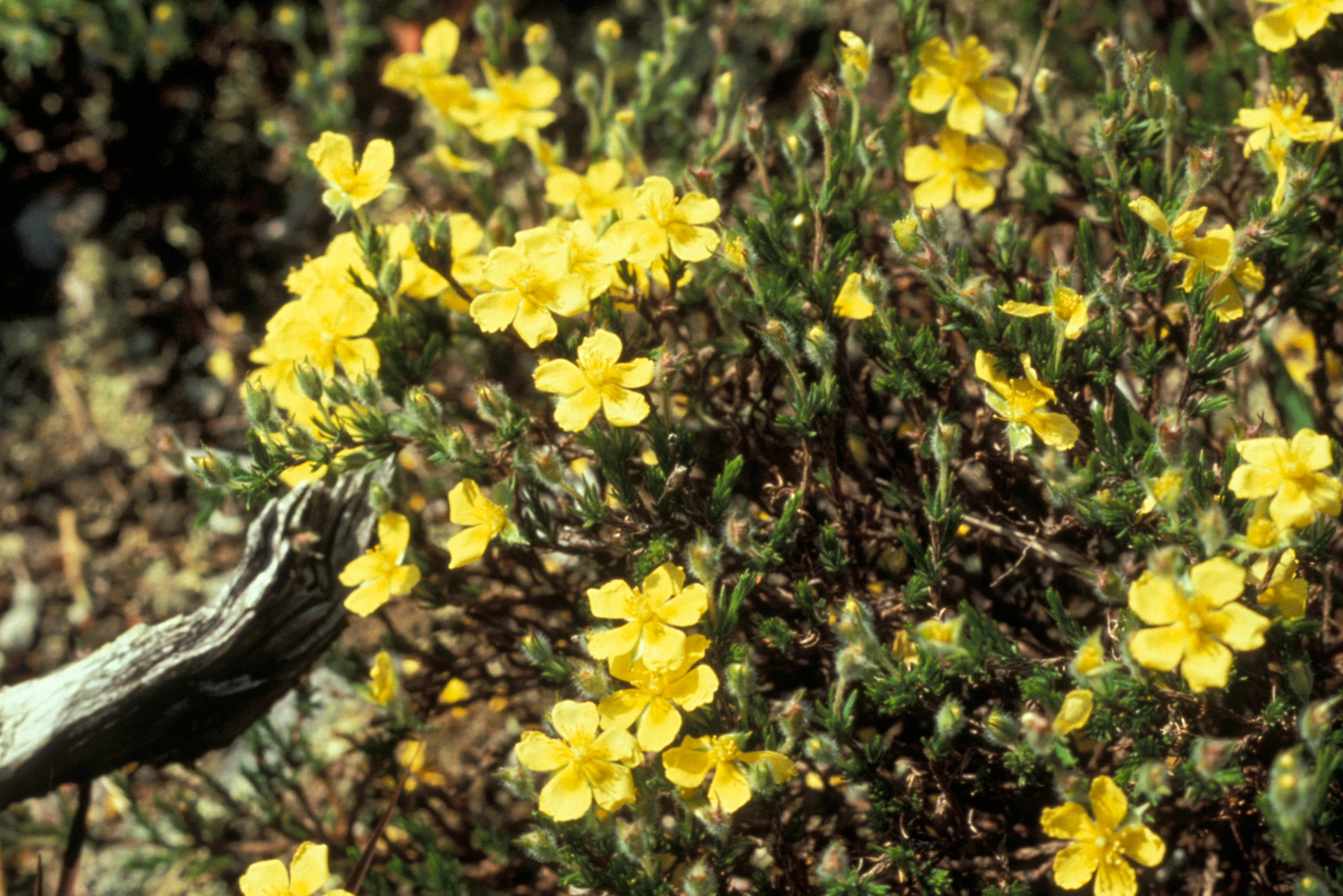

Conservation status
- Critically Imperiled (NatureServe)

Scientific classification
- Kingdom: Plantae
- Clade: Embryophytes
- Clade: Tracheophytes
- Clade: Spermatophytes
- Clade: Angiosperms
- Clade: Eudicots
- Clade: Rosids
- Order: Malvales
- Family: Cistaceae
- Genus: Hudsonia
- Species: H. montana

Binomial name
- Hudsonia montana Nutt.

= Hudsonia montana =

Species of flowering plant

Hudsonia montana is a rare species of flowering plant in the rock-rose family known by the common name mountain goldenheather. It is endemic to North Carolina, where it is present in only two counties. It is a federally listed threatened species of the United States.

This is a small shrub forming low bushes up to 30 or 40 centimeters tall. The spreading stems are covered in green, needle-like leaves and the plant blooms in bright yellow flowers in June and July.

The plant is known from Burke and McDowell Counties in North Carolina. There are seven populations.

This species is sometimes considered a subspecies of Hudsonia ericoides.

The Latin specific epithet montana refers to mountains or coming from mountains.
