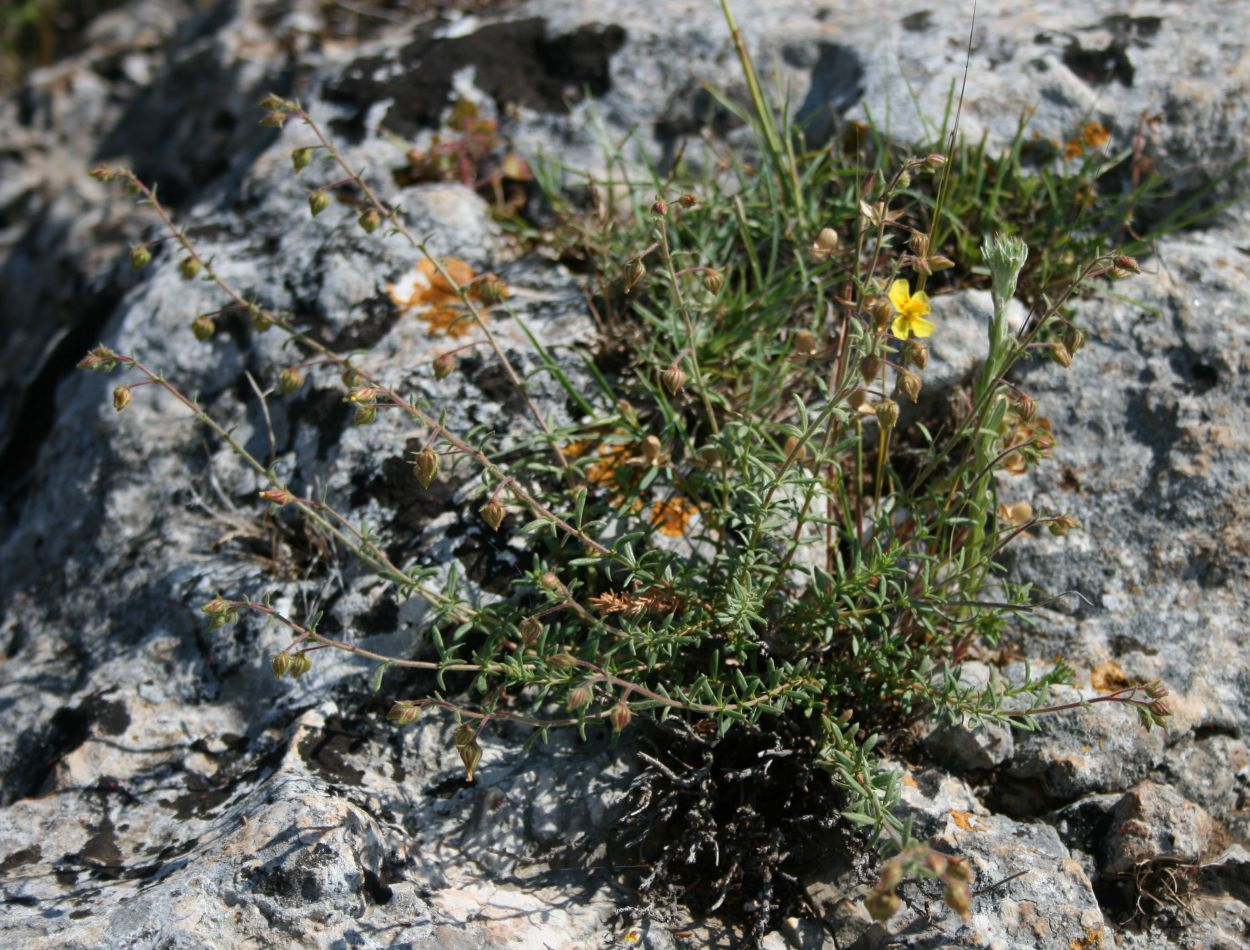

Scientific classification
- Kingdom: Plantae
- Clade: Tracheophytes
- Clade: Angiosperms
- Clade: Eudicots
- Clade: Rosids
- Order: Malvales
- Family: Cistaceae
- Genus: Fumana
- Species: F. thymifolia

Binomial name
- Fumana thymifolia (L.) Spach ex Webb

Synonyms
- Helianthemum thymifolium

= Fumana thymifolia =

Species of plant

Fumana thymifolia, the thyme leaved fumana, is a species of shrub in the family Cistaceae. They have a self-supporting growth form and simple, broad leaves and dry fruit. Individuals can grow to 30 cm tall.

== Sources ==
This article incorporates text from a free content work. Licensed under CC0 (license statement/permission). Text taken from Fumana thymifolia. Encyclopedia of Life.
