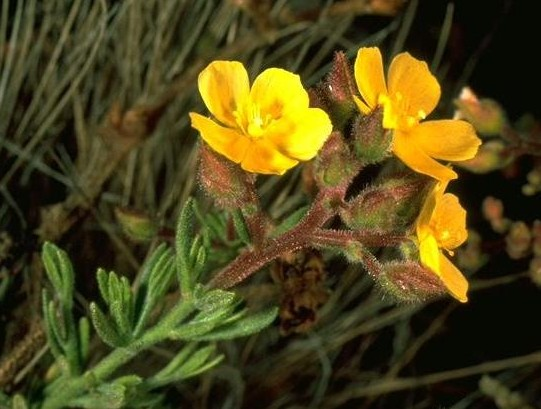

Conservation status
- Imperiled (NatureServe)

Scientific classification
- Kingdom: Plantae
- Clade: Embryophytes
- Clade: Tracheophytes
- Clade: Spermatophytes
- Clade: Angiosperms
- Clade: Eudicots
- Clade: Rosids
- Order: Malvales
- Family: Cistaceae
- Genus: Crocanthemum
- Species: C. greenei

Binomial name
- Crocanthemum greenei (B.L.Rob.) Sorrie

Synonyms
- Helianthemum greenei

= Crocanthemum greenei =

Species of flowering plant

Crocanthemum greenei is a rare species of flowering plant in the rock-rose family known by the common name island rush-rose. It is endemic to the Channel Islands of California, where it grows in the chaparral of the rocky seaside slopes. It is present on three of the eight islands, where it has historically been threatened by feral herbivores such as the Santa Cruz sheep and is making a gradual recovery. It is a federally listed threatened species.

This wildflower is an erect perennial herb reaching a maximum height near 30 centimeters. Its leafy stem is mostly green, with new growth and inflorescences at the top often appearing purple in color. The leaves are narrow, linear, and pointed, up to three centimeters long. The inflorescence is generally a panicle, producing many buds which open into golden yellow flowers one to two centimeters wide. Each rock-rose flower has five rounded petals over five smaller, fuzzy-haired sepals. The fruit is an oval-shaped capsule half a centimeter wide.

Today this plant is found on Santa Cruz, Santa Catalina, and Santa Rosa Islands; it has not been recorded on San Miguel Island in several decades.
