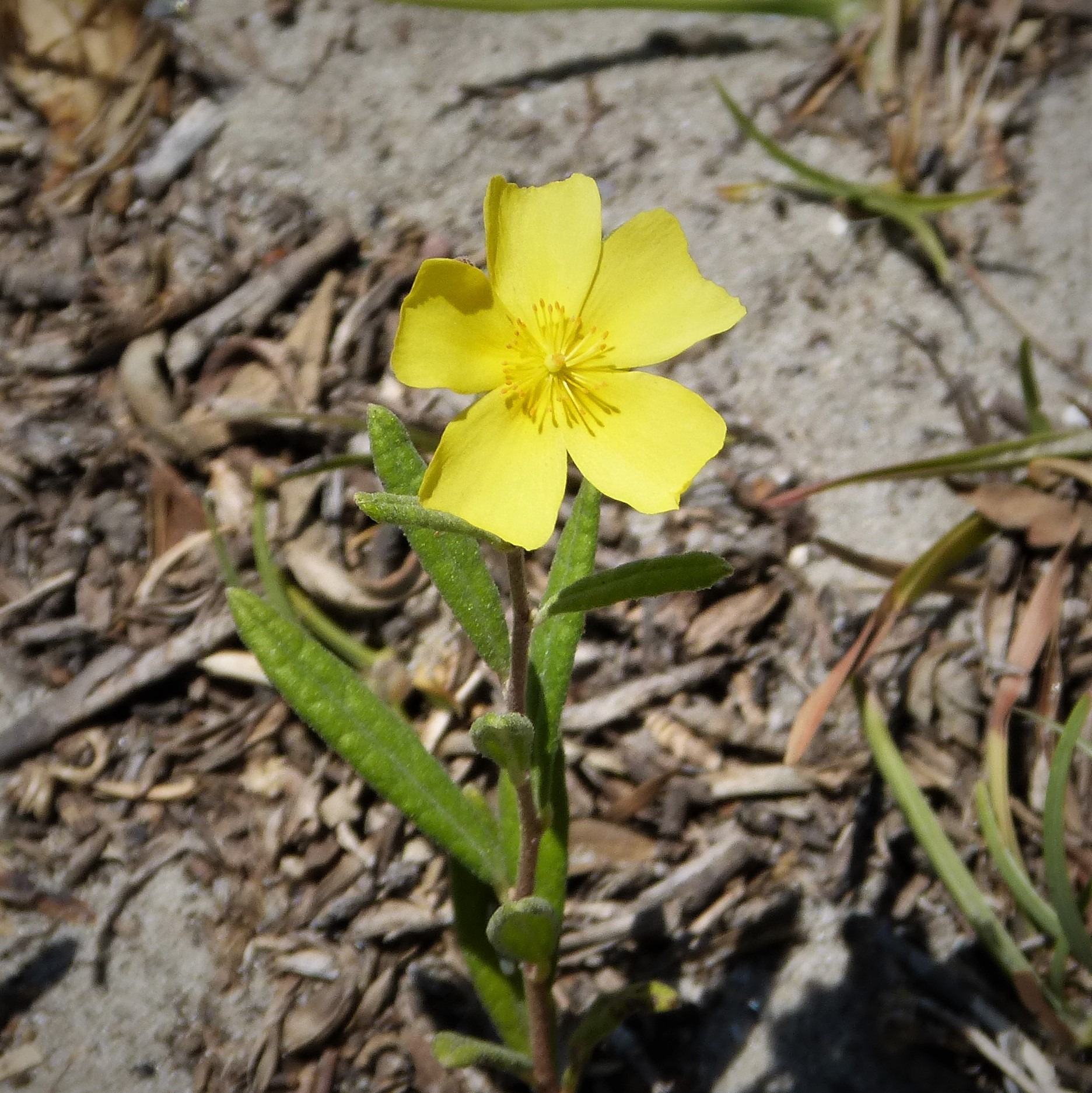

Scientific classification
- Kingdom: Plantae
- Clade: Embryophytes
- Clade: Tracheophytes
- Clade: Spermatophytes
- Clade: Angiosperms
- Clade: Eudicots
- Clade: Rosids
- Order: Malvales
- Family: Cistaceae
- Genus: Crocanthemum
- Species: C. carolinianum

Binomial name
- Crocanthemum carolinianum (Walter) Spach (1836)

= Crocanthemum carolinianum =

Genus of flowering plants

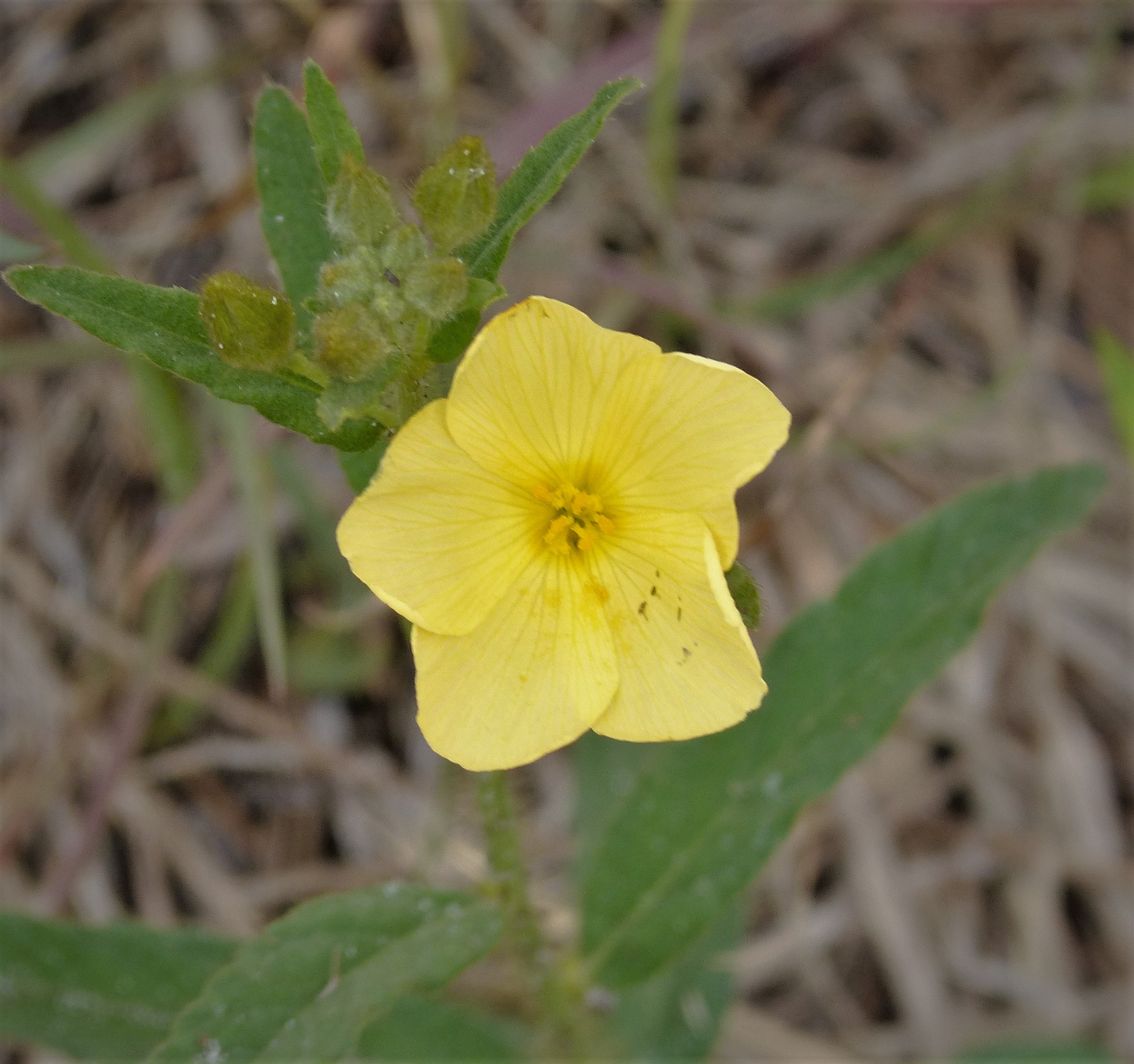

Crocanthemum carolinianum, commonly referred to as Carolina frostweed or Carolina sunrose, is a flowering plant that grows in the southeastern United States. Flowers have five bright yellow petals.

Helianthemum carolinianum is a synonym for it.

Areas where it grows include southern Alabama and the northern half of the Florida peninsula and Florida Panhandle.

It is in the Cistaceae (rock-rose) family.

C. carolinianum are perennials with alternately arranged leaves. The leaves are elliptic to obovate in shape, and reach a length of 2 to 5 centimeters (0.8 to 2.0 in).

== Ecology ==
Crocanthemum carolinianum is insect pollinated and is recorded to have been visited in northern Florida by Ceratina, Lasioglossum reticulatum, and Lasioglossum tegulare/puteulanum.
