= Fumana laevis =

Scientific classification
- Kingdom: Plantae
- Clade: Tracheophytes
- Clade: Angiosperms
- Clade: Eudicots
- Clade: Rosids
- Order: Malvales
- Family: Cistaceae
- Genus: Fumana
- Species: F. laevis

Binomial name
- Fumana laevis (Cav.) Pau

Synonyms
- Fumana laevis subsp. juniperina

Species of plant

Fumana laevis is a species of plants in the family Cistaceae.

== Sources ==
This article incorporates text from a free content work. Licensed under CC0 (license statement/permission). Text taken from Fumana laevis. Encyclopedia of Life.
