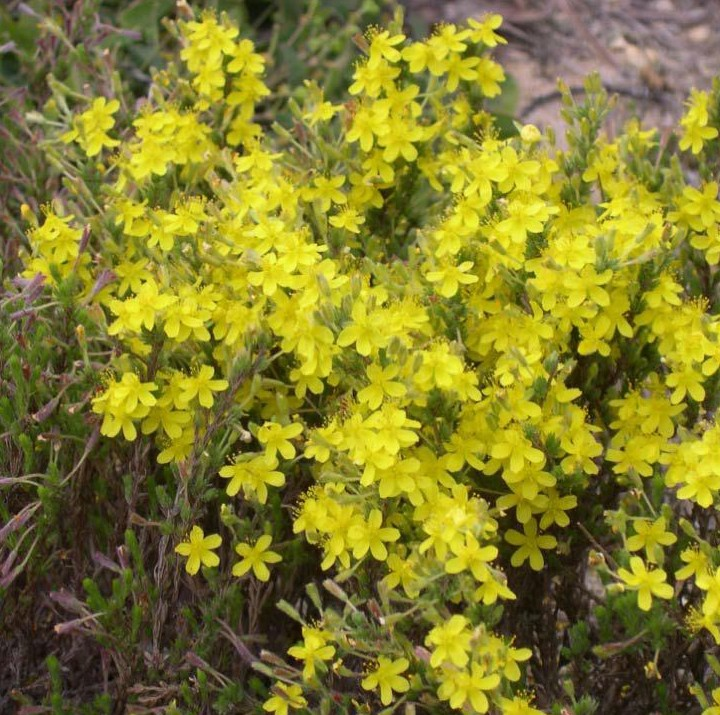

Conservation status
- Secure (NatureServe)

Scientific classification
- Kingdom: Plantae
- Clade: Embryophytes
- Clade: Tracheophytes
- Clade: Spermatophytes
- Clade: Angiosperms
- Clade: Eudicots
- Clade: Rosids
- Order: Malvales
- Family: Cistaceae
- Genus: Hudsonia
- Species: H. tomentosa

Binomial name
- Hudsonia tomentosa Nutt.

= Hudsonia tomentosa =

Species of flowering plant

Hudsonia tomentosa is a species of flowering plant in the rockrose family known by the common names woolly beachheather, beach heather, and sand heather. It is native to northeastern North America, including central and eastern Canada and the northeastern United States.

== Description ==
This species is a small shrub growing up to about 8 inches tall. The leaves are tiny, scale-like, and coated in woolly hairs. The yellow flowers have five petals and measure about 0.25 inches (6.4 mm) wide. The plant flowers from May to July.

== Ecology ==
This shrub grows in sandy habitat such as pine barrens and dunes. It may be a coastal species, but since it is less tolerant of sea spray than other coastal plants, it is generally found on arid backdunes and not at the water's edge. The plant is associated with green sands colonized with nitrogen fixing blue-green algae, particularly in Alberta. These algae may give nutrients to the shrub, allowing it to grow in nutrient-poor sand soils.

This plant "requires periodic disturbance," however, it is "very sensitive to human impacts," such as trampling. It has narrow habitat requirements but it can be locally abundant.
