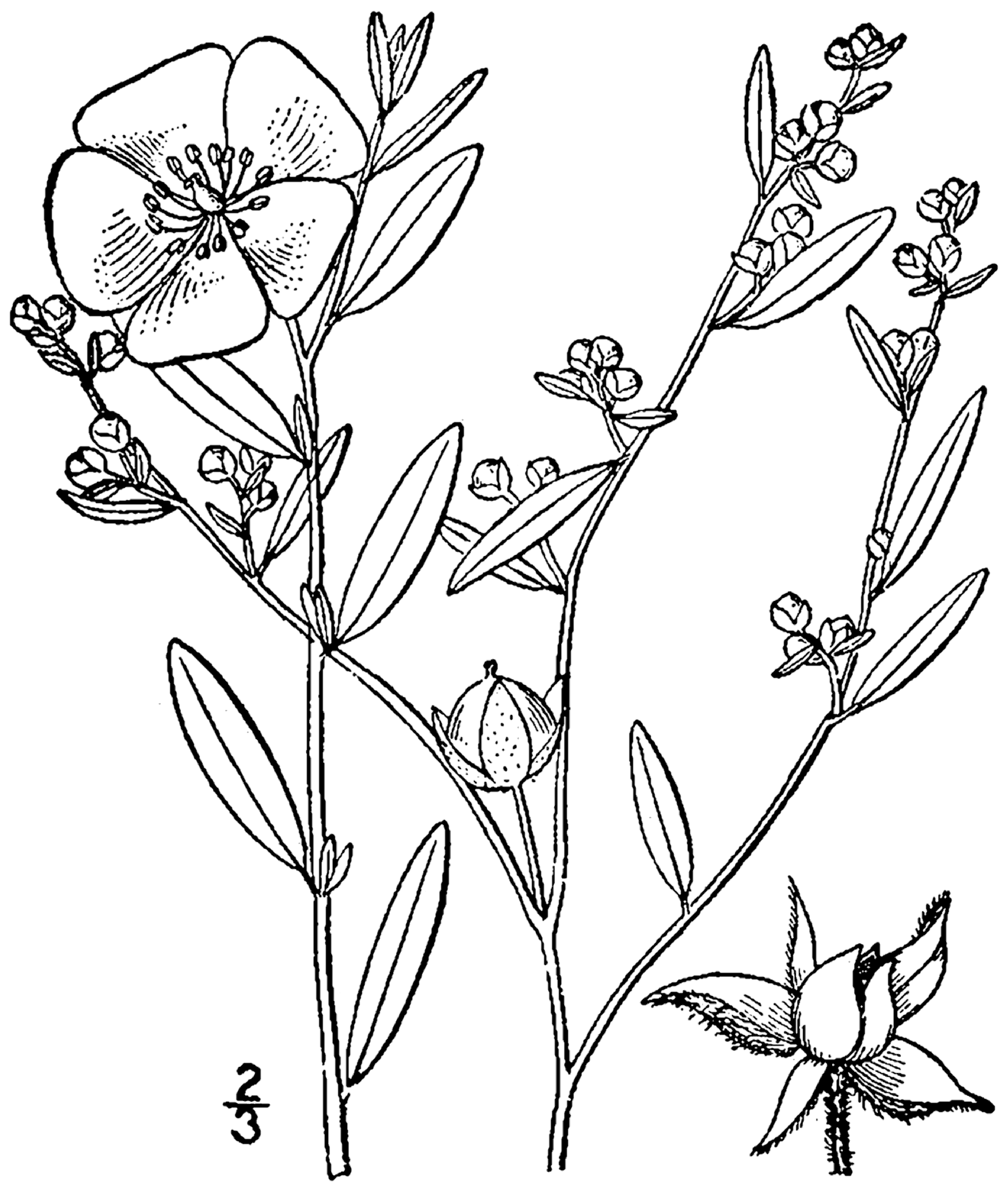

Scientific classification
- Kingdom: Plantae
- Clade: Embryophytes
- Clade: Tracheophytes
- Clade: Spermatophytes
- Clade: Angiosperms
- Clade: Eudicots
- Clade: Rosids
- Order: Malvales
- Family: Cistaceae
- Genus: Helianthemum
- Species: H. canadense

Binomial name
- Helianthemum canadense (L.) Michx.

= Helianthemum canadense =

Species of flowering plant

Helianthemum canadense or Crocanthemum canadense (known as longbranch frostweed, Canada frostweed, frostweed, rock frost, frostplant, or frostwort) is a species of rock-rose (Cistaceae), native to eastern North America.

== Description ==
It is a flowering perennial 8–24 inches (200–610 mm) in height that blooms from May to June for a single day. Each stem normally has a single flower, but rarely can have two. The flower is yellow in color, with five petals and is between 3/4 and 1 1/4 inches across. The leaves are covered in hairs and alternate in pattern. The stems are also covered in hairs and are brown or green in color.
