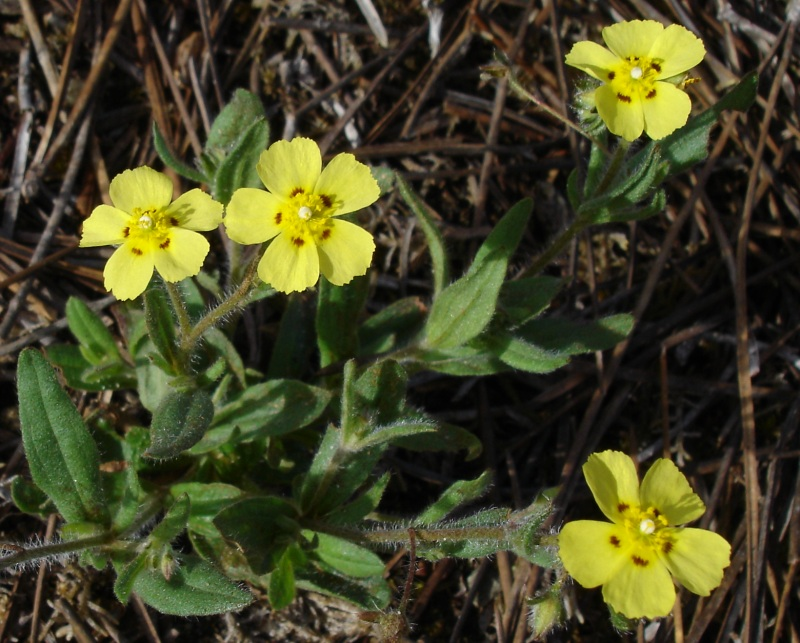
- Tuberaria guttata

Scientific classification
- Kingdom: Plantae
- Clade: Embryophytes
- Clade: Tracheophytes
- Clade: Spermatophytes
- Clade: Angiosperms
- Clade: Eudicots
- Clade: Rosids
- Order: Malvales
- Family: Cistaceae
- Genus: Tuberaria (Dunal) Spach (1836)

Type species
- Helianthemum tuberaria (L.) Mill.

Synonyms
- Diatelia Demoly (2011); Therocistus Holub (1986); Xolantha Raf. (1810); Xolanthes Raf. (1838)

= Tuberaria =

Genus of flowering plants

Tuberaria is a genus of about 12 species of annual or perennial plants in the rockrose family Cistaceae, native to western and southern Europe. They occur on dry, stony sites, often close to the sea.

The leaves are in a rosette at the base of the plant, and then in opposite pairs up the stem; they are simple oval, 2–5 cm long and 1–2 cm broad. The flowers are 2–5 cm diameter, with five petals, yellow with a red spot at the base of each petal, the red spot acting as a 'target' for pollinating insects.

Tuberaria species are used as food plants by the larvae of some Lepidoptera species including the Coleophora case-bearers C. confluella (recorded on T. guttata) and C. helianthemella (recorded on T. lignosa).

== Species ==
12 species are accepted.

- Tuberaria acuminata (Viv.) Grosser
- Tuberaria brevipes (Boiss. & Reut.) Willk.
- Tuberaria bupleurifolia (Lam.) Willk.
- Tuberaria × colombina C.Vicioso
- Tuberaria commutata M.J.Gallego
- Tuberaria echioides (Lam.) Willk.
- Tuberaria globulariifolia (Lam.) Willk.
- Tuberaria guttata (L.) Fourr.
- Tuberaria lignosa (Sweet) Samp.
- Tuberaria lipopetala (Murb.) Greuter & Burdet
- Tuberaria macrosepala (Coss.) Willk.
- Tuberaria major (Willk.) P.Silva & Rozeira
- Tuberaria plantaginea (Willd.) M.J.Gallego
- Tuberaria praecox (Salzm. ex Boiss. & Reut.) Grosser
