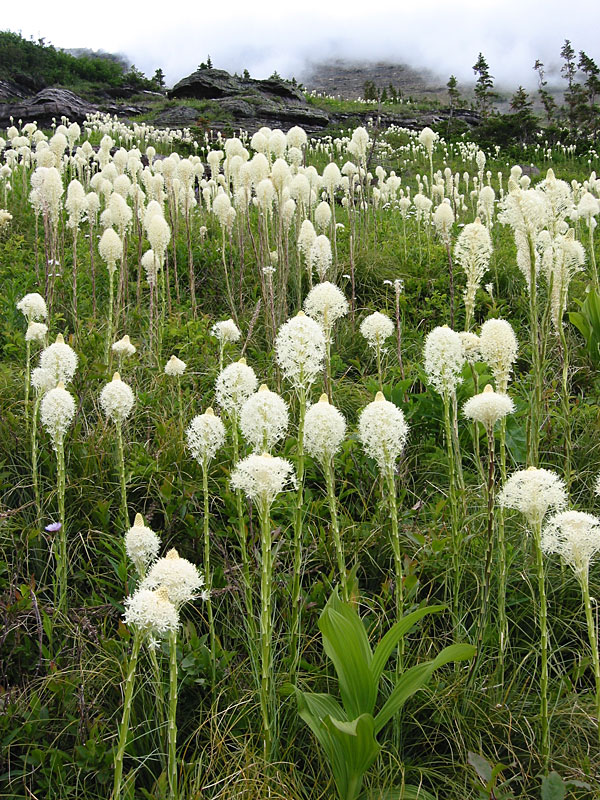
- Xerophyllum tenax

Scientific classification
- Kingdom: Plantae
- Clade: Tracheophytes
- Clade: Angiosperms
- Clade: Monocots
- Order: Liliales
- Family: Melanthiaceae
- Tribe: Xerophylleae
- Genus: Xerophyllum; Michx.

= Xerophyllum (plant) =

Genus of flowering plants

Xerophyllum is a genus of perennial plants from the family Melanthiaceae. The genus is native to North America.

There are two species:

- Xerophyllum asphodeloides (Pursh) Nutt. - southern Appalachians from Alabama to Maryland; also Delaware + New Jersey
- Xerophyllum tenax (Pursh) Nutt. - Alberta, British Columbia, Montana, Idaho, Wyoming, Washington, Oregon, N + W California

Some species formerly placed in this genus have been transferred to others (within the tribe Melanthieae):

- Xerophyllum gramineum = Stenanthium gramineum (Ker Gawl.) Morong
- Xerophyllum sabadilla = Schoenocaulon officinale (Schltdl. & Cham.) A.Gray

The elongated leaves of X. tenax, commonly known as bear grass, are used for basket weaving by the Native Americans. Xerophyllum asphodeloides, also known as turkey's beard, is a popular garden plant, producing spikes of white flowers.
