= Pakaraimaea =

Conservation status
- Least Concern (IUCN 3.1)

Scientific classification
- Kingdom: Plantae
- Clade: Tracheophytes
- Clade: Angiosperms
- Clade: Eudicots
- Clade: Rosids
- Order: Malvales
- Family: Cistaceae
- Genus: Pakaraimaea; Maguire & P.S.Ashton (1977)
- Species: P. dipterocarpacea

Binomial name
- Pakaraimaea dipterocarpacea Maguire & P.S.Ashton (1977)

Genus of flowering plants in the rock rose family

Pakaraimaea is a genus of trees in the family Cistaceae. The genus contains a single species, Pakaraimaea dipterocarpacea, from South America. It was formerly placed in subfamily Pakaraimoideae of the family Dipterocarpaceae. The species is found in the western highlands of Guyana and in adjacent Bolivar State in Venezuela. It maintains strong ectomycorrhizal associations with a wide variety of fungal species. The trees can sometimes be seen forming large stands in the western Guyanas.

== Taxonomy ==
As of APG IV, the species has been moved out of the Dipterocarpaceae (formerly in subfamily Pakaraimoideae) and is now placed within an expanded Cistaceae due to molecular evidence showing that it is sister to the remainder of Cistaceae.

=== Subspecies ===
As of March 2024, Plants of the World Online accepted two subspecies:

- Pakaraimaea dipterocarpacea subsp. dipterocarpacea
- Pakaraimaea dipterocarpacea subsp. nitida Maguire & Steyerm.
