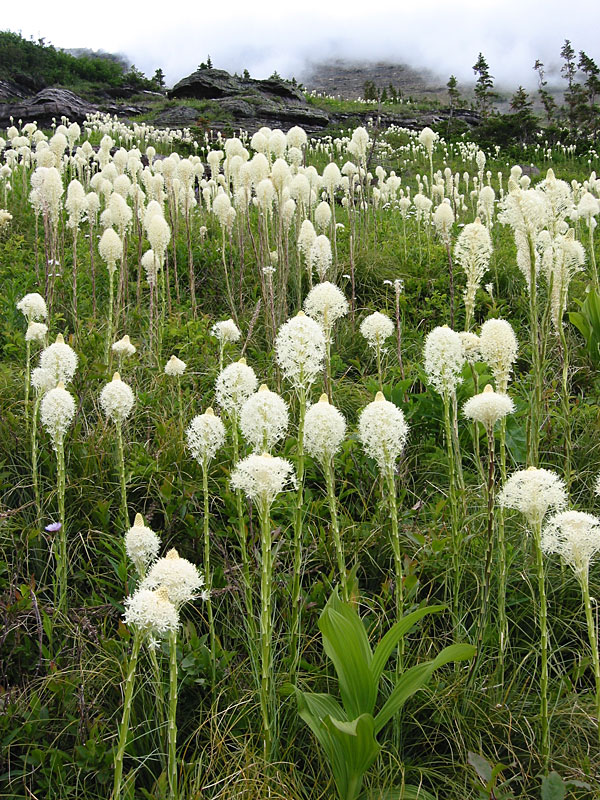
- Glacier National Park, Montana

Conservation status
- Secure (NatureServe)

Scientific classification
- Kingdom: Plantae
- Clade: Tracheophytes
- Clade: Angiosperms
- Clade: Monocots
- Order: Liliales
- Family: Melanthiaceae
- Genus: Xerophyllum
- Species: X. tenax

Binomial name
- Xerophyllum tenax (Pursh) Nutt.

Synonyms
- Helonias tenax Pursh; Melanthium spicatum Walter; Xerophyllum douglasii S.Watson

= Xerophyllum tenax =

Species of flowering plant

Xerophyllum tenax is a species of plants in the corn lily family. It is known by several common names, including bear grass, soap grass, quip-quip, and Indian basket grass. Beargrass can grow to be a little over 1.2 metres (4 ft) tall when in a preferred habitat and ideal conditions. The plant typically blooms at irregular intervals, depending on environmental factors such as moisture and temperature.

The plant is found in the same forested and meadowed areas where bears are commonly present. It thrives in environments such as the Pacific Northwest, California, and parts of the Rocky Mountains. Bears are known to feed on the softer leaf bases of the plant, which may have influenced its common name. The rootstock and pods were cooked and eaten by Native Americans, who also used the long, fibrous leaves for weaving.

== Description ==
Xerophyllum tenax is a perennial herb that can grow to 15–150 centimetres (6–59 in) in height. It can grow to be a little over 1.2 metres (4 ft) tall when in a preferred habitat and ideal conditions such as ample sunlight. It grows in bunches with the leaves wrapped around and extending from a small stem at ground level. The leaves are 30–100 cm (12–39 1/2 in) long, 2–6 millimetres (1/16–1/4 in) wide, and dull olive green with toothed edges.

While it is a common myth that beargrass blooms every seven years, the plant typically blooms at irregular intervals, depending on environmental factors such as moisture and temperature. Emerging from the tip of the stalk like an upright club, a tightly packed raceme bears slightly fragrant white flowers. These have six sepals and six stamens. The plant produces small, tan-colored seeds, which germinate after a cold period of 12 to 16 weeks.

Depending on site-specific and environmental conditions, plants may bloom every year or only once every decade, though back-to-back blooming of individual plants is rare.

== Distribution and habitat ==
The plant is found mostly in western North America from British Columbia south to California and east to Wyoming, in subalpine meadows and coastal mountains, and also on low ground in the California coastal fog belt as far south as Monterey County. It is common on the Olympic Peninsula and in the Cascades, northern Sierra Nevada and Rockies.

The species typically grows in forest understories, with its growth closely influenced by light availability often dictated by canopy density. Beargrass flowers in tall racemes that are primarily pollinated by large-bodied insects like bees, which are attracted by the plant's floral characteristics. The density and vigor of beargrass tends to be more robust in areas with moderate to low canopy cover, where light penetration is greater. In denser, shaded forests, the plant tends to be smaller and less productive. Light availability and historical stand disturbances play key roles in determining the morphology and reproductive success of beargrass, with plants growing larger and reproducing more in open, disturbed habitats. Depending on conditions such as moisture and temperatures it periodically blooms in large concentrations.

One study found that smoke-water significantly increased the germination rates of beargrass seeds compared to controls. These results indicate that smoke-water could be an effective tool for promoting beargrass regeneration, particularly in low-elevation sites with altered fire regimes.

== Ecology ==
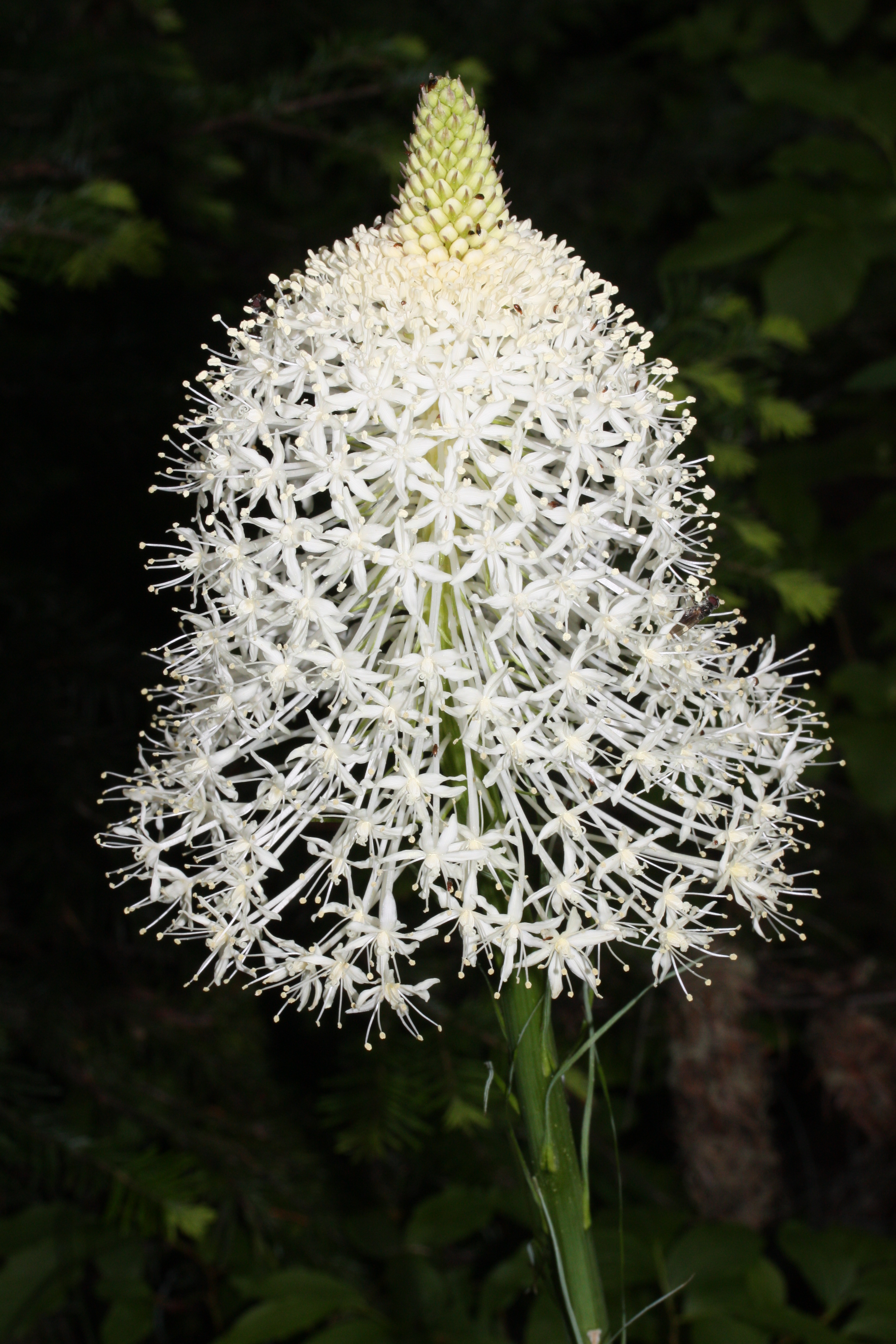
Mount Rainier National Park, Washington, US

X. tenax is an important part of the fire ecology of regions where it is native. It has rhizomes which survive fire that clears dead and dying plant matter from the surface of the ground. The plant thrives with periodic burns and is often the first plant to sprout in a scorched area.

Deer and elk eat the flowers and other parts of the plant. Bears eat the softer leaf bases, thought to be an influence on the plant's common name (in tandem with its habitat).

== Uses ==
The fibrous leaves, which turn white as they dry, are tough, durable, and easily dyed and manipulated into tight waterproof weaves. Native Americans have woven the plant in baskets, including the Hupa, who use it to create a border pattern. Native Americans historically roasted the rootstock for food; they also ate the pods, which are good cooked. Native Americans also braid dried leaves and adorn them on traditional buckskin dresses and jewelry.
