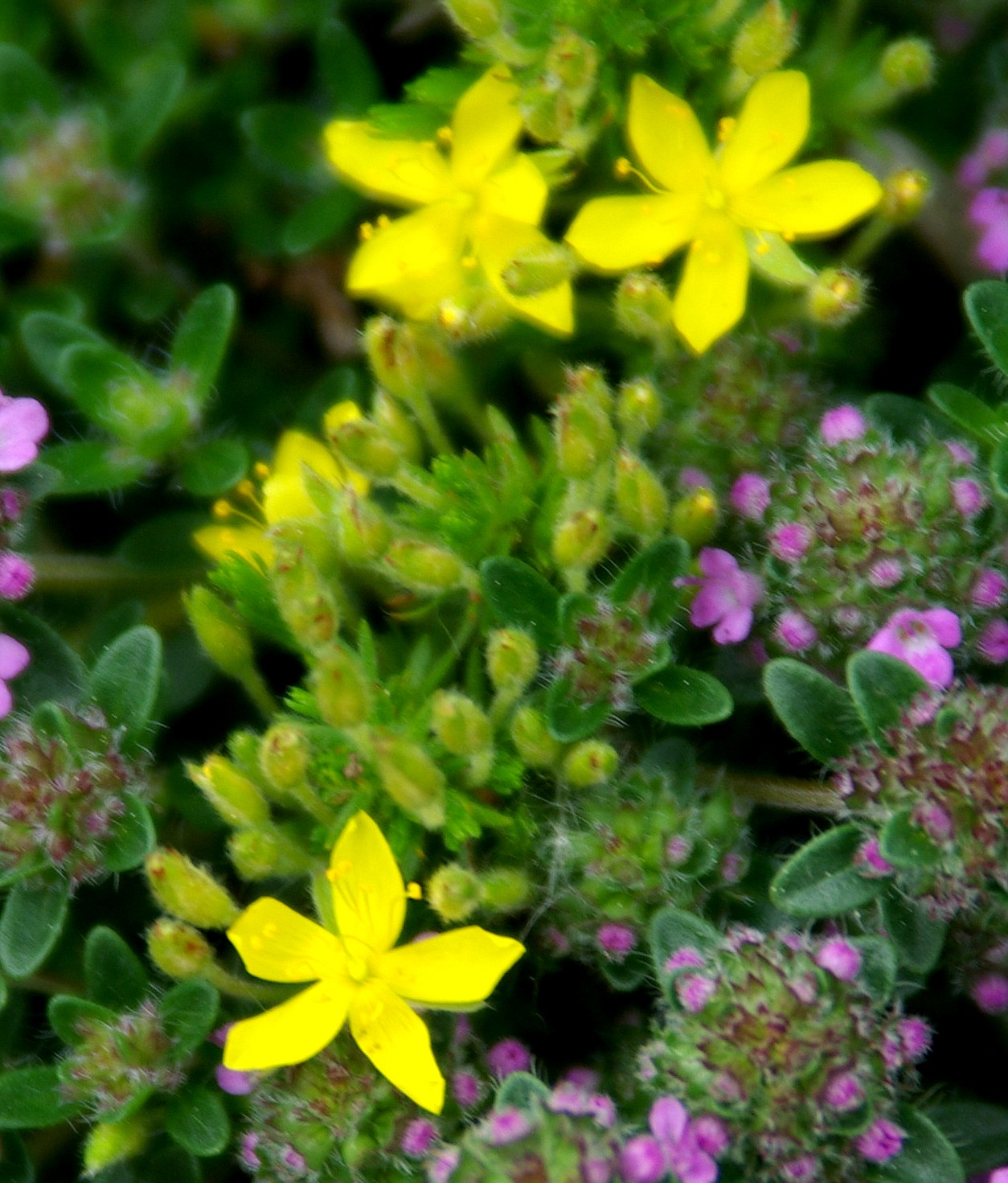

Conservation status
- Apparently Secure (NatureServe)

Scientific classification
- Kingdom: Plantae
- Clade: Embryophytes
- Clade: Tracheophytes
- Clade: Spermatophytes
- Clade: Angiosperms
- Clade: Eudicots
- Clade: Rosids
- Order: Malvales
- Family: Cistaceae
- Genus: Hudsonia
- Species: H. ericoides

Binomial name
- Hudsonia ericoides L.

= Hudsonia ericoides =

Species of flowering plant

Hudsonia ericoides is a species of flowering plant in the rock-rose family known by the common names pine barren goldenheather, false heather, and golden-heather. It is native to eastern North America, where its distribution extends down the east coast from Newfoundland to Delaware, with a disjunct population in South Carolina.

== Description ==
This plant is a perennial shrub which grows low to the ground, forming a dense mat up to a meter wide. It has a taproot and a system of fibrous roots within the top few centimeters of soil. The branches are covered with small green needlelike leaves each just a few millimeters long and under half a millimeter wide. It has white or yellow petals and simple leaves.

== Distribution and habitat ==
This plant occurs mainly in coastal pine plant communities, such as pine barrens. It is common in the Pine Barrens of New Jersey and on Cape Cod, Martha's Vineyard, and Nantucket in Massachusetts. It occurs on Long Island with pitch pines. The soils are dry and sandy. The plant grows easily on dunes and beaches where the climate is humid and windy. The plant does not tolerate shade and can be best found in sunny environments.

This shrub is a pioneer species that can sometimes be found in disturbed habitat such as roadsides. It is commonly found in habitat that experiences frequent wildfires, as pine barrens do.

Various species of the plant are presumed at risk with one of them being presumed extinct.
