= Sotosalbos =

Sotosalbos Urueñas
- Municipality
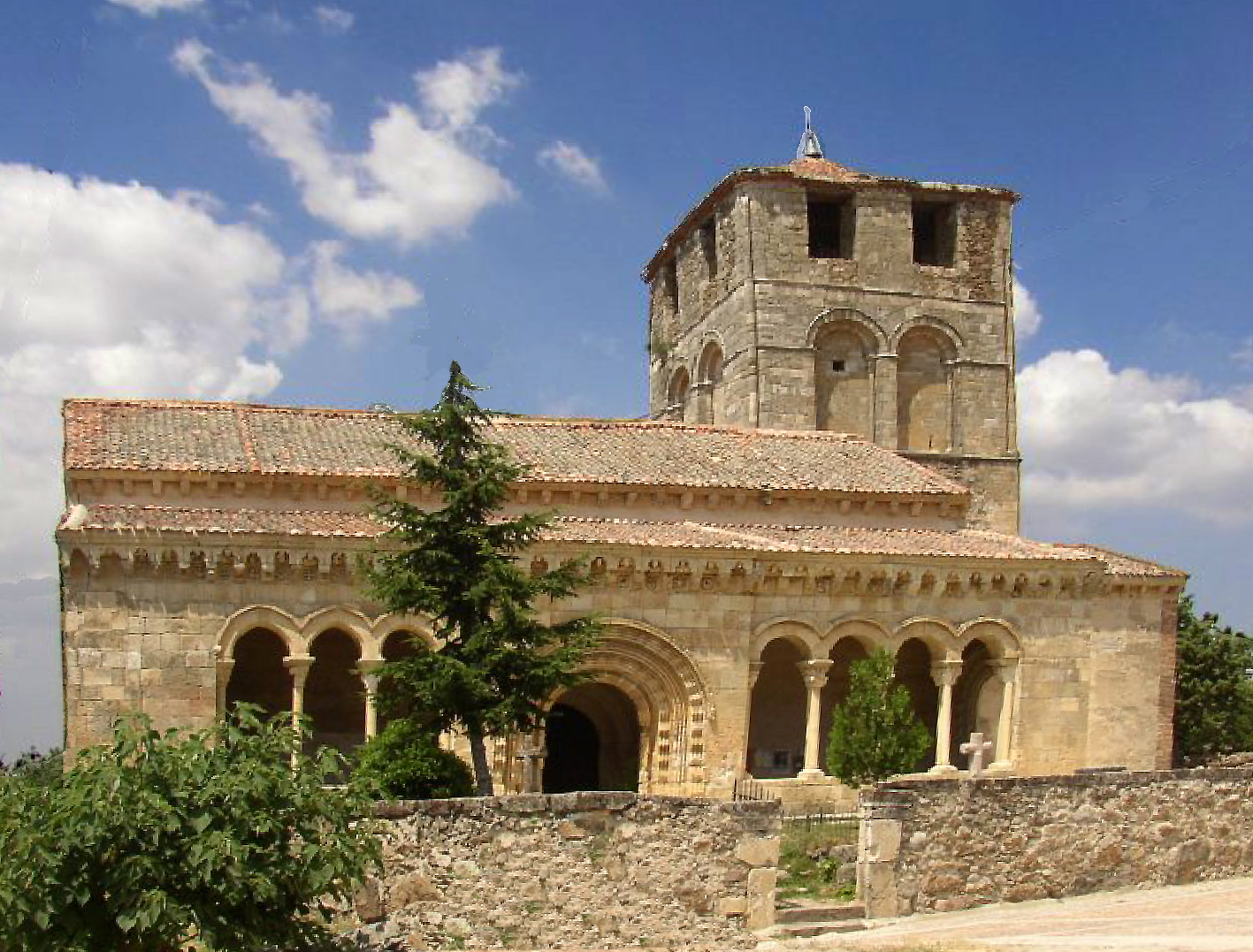

- Location in Spain. Sotosalbos (Spain)
- Coordinates: 41°02′04″N 3°56′28″W
- Country: Spain
- Autonomous community: Castile and León
- Province: Segovia
- Municipality: Sotosalbos

Area
  - Total: 23.92 km^{2} (9.24 sq mi)
- Elevation: 1,162 m (3,812 ft)

Population (2025-01-01)
  - Total: 132
  - Density: 5.52/km^{2} (14.3/sq mi)
- Time zone: UTC+1 (CET)
  - Summer (DST): UTC+2 (CEST)
- Website: Official website

Sotosalbos is a municipality located in the province of Segovia, Castile and León, Spain. According to the 2004 census (INE), the municipality had a population of 119 inhabitants.

== Gallery ==
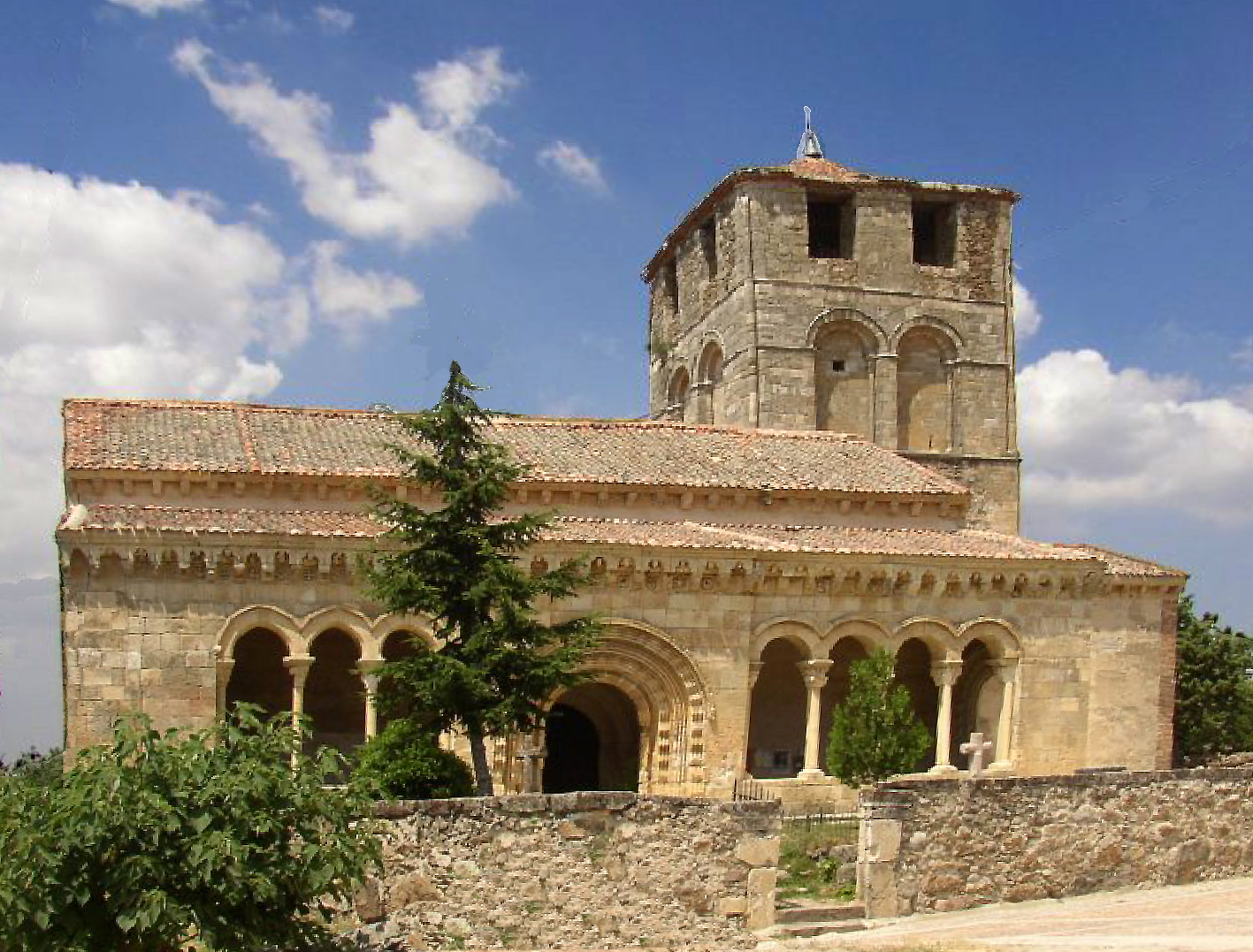
Saint Michael's church, Sotosalbos.

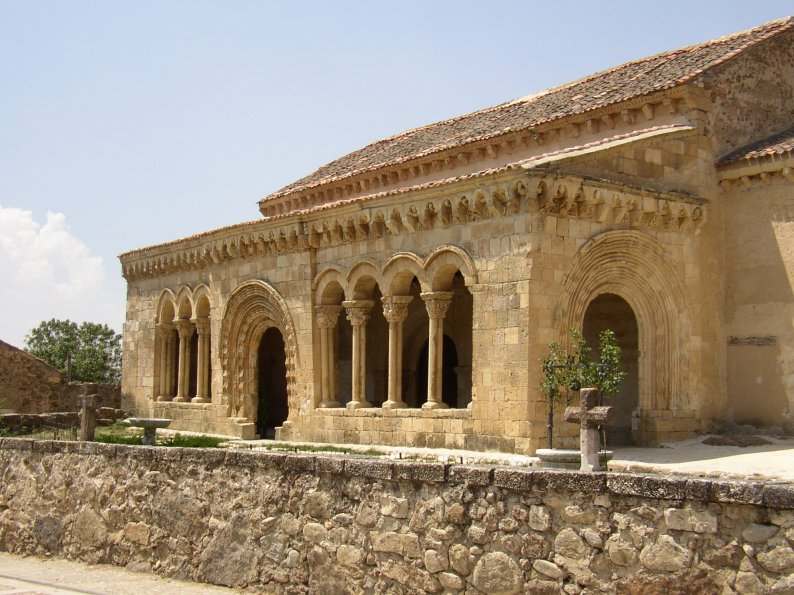
Facade of the Romanesque church of Sotosalbos.
