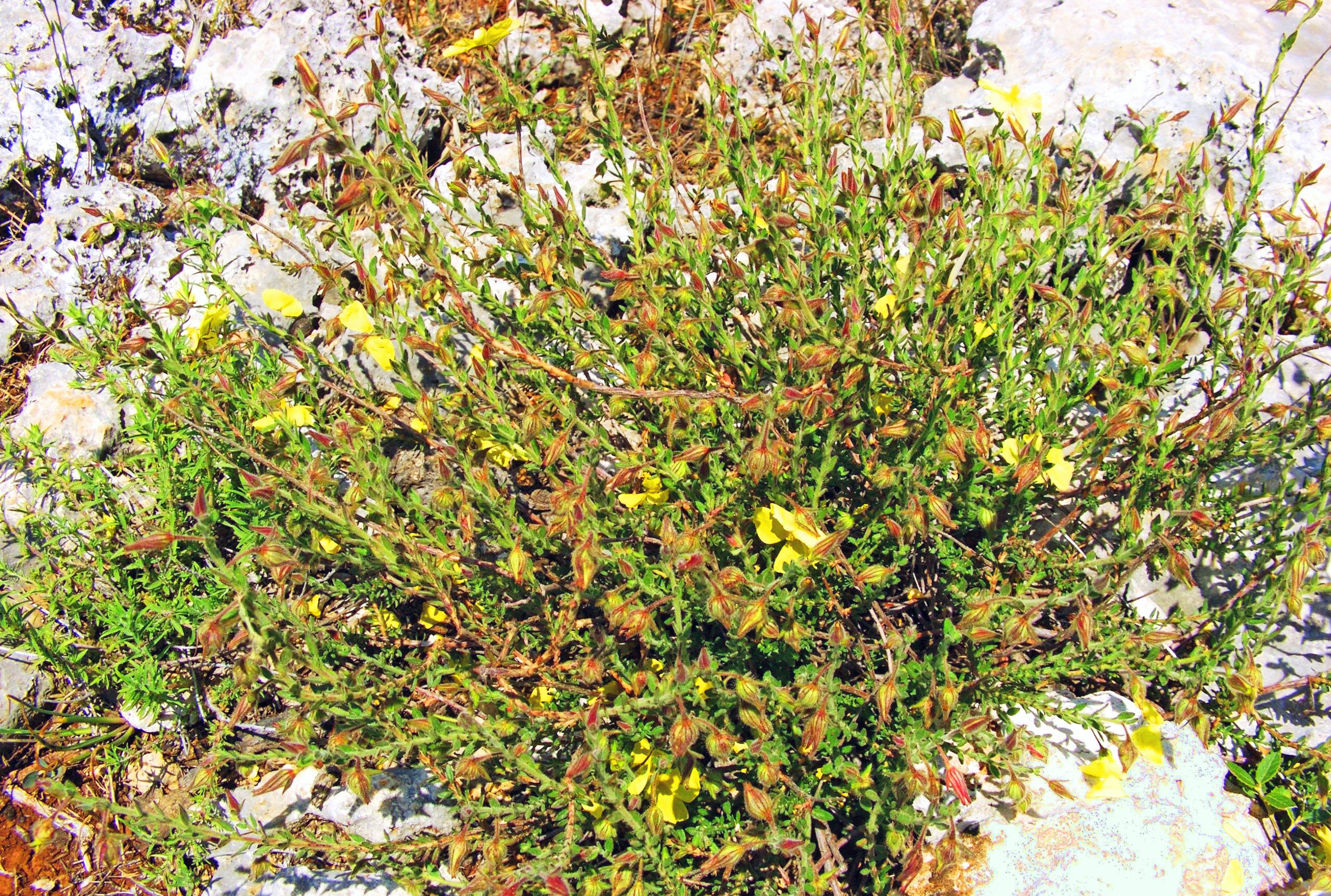
- Fumana arabica, Mediterranean rockrose

Scientific classification
- Kingdom: Plantae
- Clade: Embryophytes
- Clade: Tracheophytes
- Clade: Spermatophytes
- Clade: Angiosperms
- Clade: Eudicots
- Clade: Rosids
- Order: Malvales
- Family: Cistaceae
- Genus: Fumana (Dunal) Spach

Species
- 19; see text

Synonyms
- Fumanopsis Pomel (1860); Pomelina (Maire) Güemes & Raynaud (1992)

= Fumana =

Genus of flowering plants

Fumana (needle sunrose) is a small genus of flowering plants in the family Cistaceae. They are small perennial shrubs with five-lobed yellow flowers, native to rocky and sandy soils of Europe and wider Mediterranean region. Fumana shrubs can be procumbent or erect. Leaves tend to be very narrow and are almost always alternate.

== Species ==
19 species, and several interspecific hybrids, are accepted.

- Fumana aciphylla Boiss.
- Fumana arabica (L.) Spach
- Fumana bonapartei Maire & Petitm.
- Fumana ericoides (Cav.) Gand.
- Fumana fontanesii Clauson ex Pomel
- Fumana fontqueri Güemes
- Fumana grandiflora Jaub. & Spach
- Fumana × heywoodii Rivas Mart. & al.
- Fumana juniperina (Lag. ex Dunal) Pau
- Fumana lacidulemiensis Güemes
- Fumana laevipes (L.) Spach
- Fumana laevis (Cav.) Pau
- Fumana × neverensis Pérez Dacosta
- Fumana oligosperma Boiss. & Kotschy
- Fumana paphlagonica Bornm. & Janch.
- Fumana paradoxa Heywood
- Fumana procumbens (Dunal) Gren. & Godr.
- Fumana × quartensis Pérez Dacosta & Mateo
- Fumana scoparia Pomel
- Fumana thymifolia (L.) Webb
- Fumana trisperma Hub.-Mor. & Reese
- Fumana × vilanovensis Pérez Dacosta
- Fumana viridis (Ten.) Sennen
- Fumana × zafrensis Pérez Dacosta & Mateo
