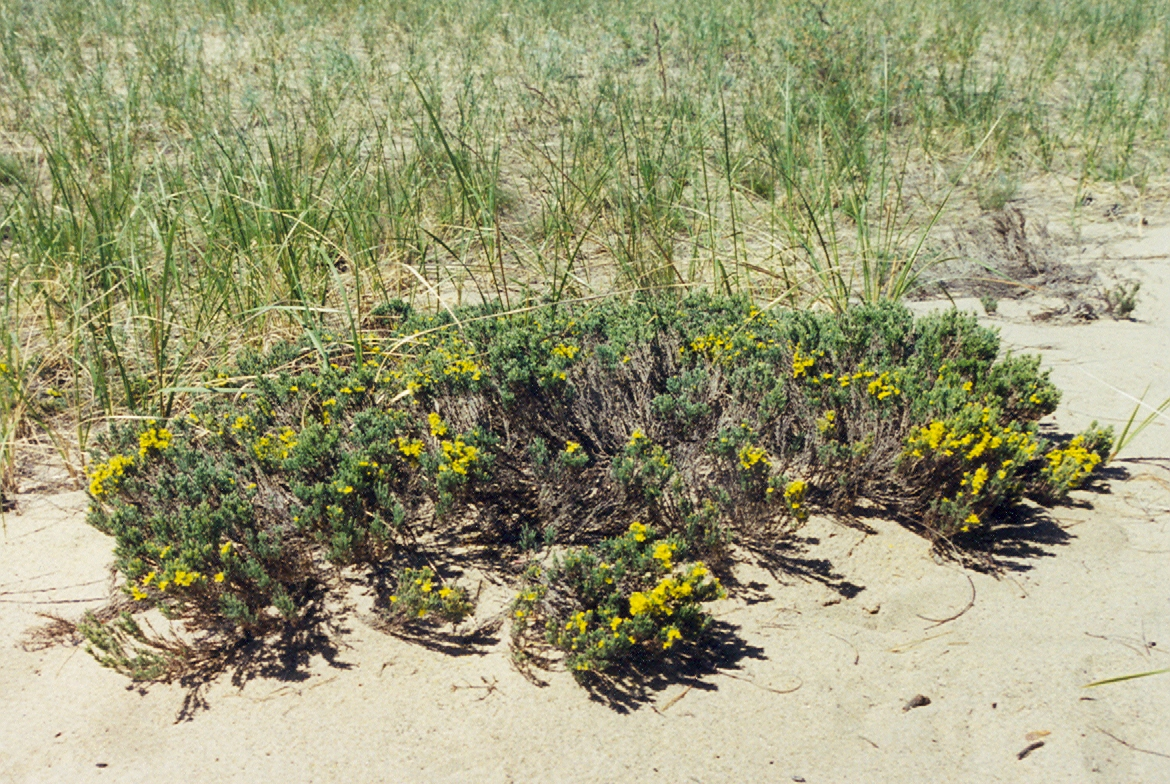
- Hudsonia tomentosa, Pancake Bay, Ontario

Scientific classification
- Kingdom: Plantae
- Clade: Embryophytes
- Clade: Tracheophytes
- Clade: Spermatophytes
- Clade: Angiosperms
- Clade: Eudicots
- Clade: Rosids
- Order: Malvales
- Family: Cistaceae
- Genus: Hudsonia; L.

Species
- See text

= Hudsonia =

Genus of flowering plants

Hudsonia (goldenheather, poverty grass) is a small genus of three species of flowering plants in the family Cistaceae, native to North America. They are typical of sand dune habitats.

They are evergreen subshrubs growing to 20 cm (7.9 in) tall.

Species
Scientific name	English name
Hudsonia ericoides	Pine barren goldenheather
Hudsonia montana (syn. H. ericoides subsp. montana)	Mountain goldenheather
Hudsonia tomentosa	Woolly beachheather

== See also ==
- Sand dune stabilization
