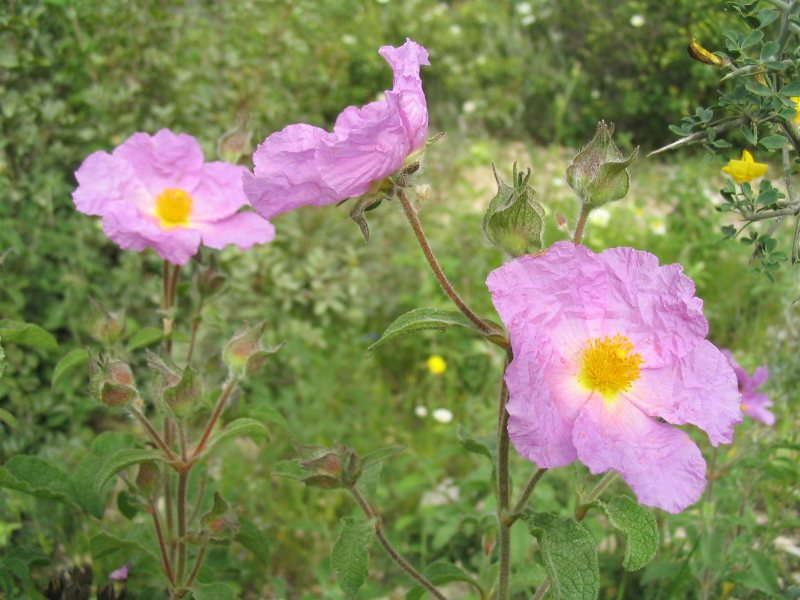
- Cistus incanus

Scientific classification
- Kingdom: Plantae
- Clade: Embryophytes
- Clade: Tracheophytes
- Clade: Spermatophytes
- Clade: Angiosperms
- Clade: Eudicots
- Clade: Rosids
- Order: Malvales
- Family: Cistaceae; Juss.

Genera
- Cistus L. (rock roses); Crocanthemum Spach; Fumana (Dunal) Spach; Helianthemum Mill.; Hudsonia L.; Lechea Kalm; Pakaraimaea Maguire and P.S.Ashton; Tuberaria (Dunal) Spach

= Cistaceae =

Family of flowering plants comprising rock roses

The Cistaceae are a small family of plants (the rock-rose or rockrose family), mostly shrubs, which are profusely covered by flowers in the spring and summer. This family consists of about 170–200 species in eight genera that are not very distinct, distributed primarily in the temperate areas of Europe and the Mediterranean basin, but also found in North America; a limited number of species are found in South America. Most Cistaceae are subshrubs and low shrubs, and some are herbaceous. They prefer dry and sunny habitats. Cistaceae grow well on poor soils, and many of them are cultivated in gardens.

They often have showy yellow, pink or white flowers, which are generally short-lived. The flowers are bisexual, regular, solitary or borne in cymes; they usually have five, sometimes three (Lechea), petals. The petals are free, usually crumpled in the bud, and sometimes in the open flower (e. g. Cistus incanus). The flowers have five sepals, the inner three of which are distinctly wider, and the outer two are narrow and sometimes regarded as bracteoles. This sepal arrangement is a characteristic property of the family.

The stamens are numerous, of variable length, and sit on a disc; filaments are free. The ovary is superior, usually with three carpels; placentation is parietal, with two or more ovules on each placenta. The fruit is a capsule, usually with five or ten valves (three in Helianthemum). The seeds are small, with a hard, water-impermeable coating, weighing around 1 mg.

Recently the neotropical species Pakaraimaea dipterocarpacea, formerly placed in the family Dipterocarpaceae, has been placed in the Cistaceae, following APG IV (2016). Unlike the rest of the family, it is a large tree, with specimens to over 130 cm (51 in) trunk diameter reported. It has also been suggested that it might be better treated in its own monotypic family.

== Ecology ==
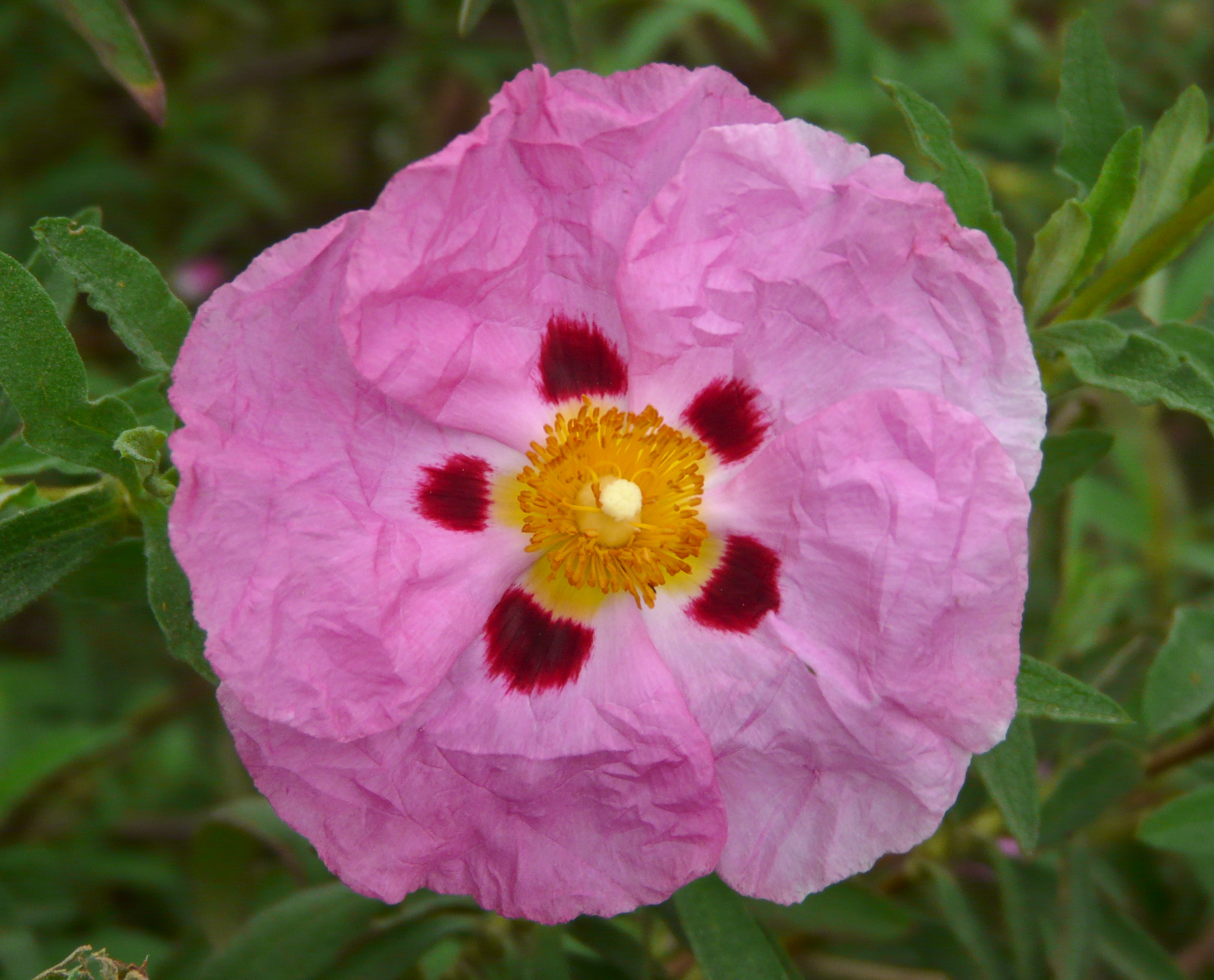
Cistus × purpureus orchid rock rose

The ability of Cistaceae to thrive in many Mediterranean habitats follows from two important ecological properties: mycorrhizal ability and fast renewal after wildfire. Most Cistaceae have the ability to create symbiotic relationship with root fungi of the genus Tuber. In this relationship, the fungus complements the root system in its task of absorbing water and minerals from the soil, and thus allows the host plant to dwell on particularly poor soils. In addition, an interesting quality of T. melanosporum is its ability to kill all vegetation except the host plant within the reach of its mycelium, and thus to give its host some sort of "exclusiveness" for the adjacent land area.

Cistaceae have also optimally adapted to the wildfires that frequently eradicate large areas of forest. The plants cast their seeds in the soil during the growth period, but they do not germinate in the next season. Their hard coating is impermeable to the water, and thus the seeds remain dormant for a long period of time. This coating together with their small size allows these plants to establish a large seed bank rather deep in the soil. Once the fire comes and kills the vegetation in the area, the seed coating softens or cracks as a result of the heating, and the surviving seeds germinate shortly after the fire. This mechanism allows the Cistaceae to produce a large number of young shoots simultaneously and at the right time, and thus to obtain an important advantage over other plants in the process of repopulating the area.

== Systematics ==
Molecular analyses of angiosperms have placed Cistaceae within the Malvales, forming a clade with two families of tropical trees, Dipterocarpaceae and Sarcolaenaceae. Recent phylogenetic studies confirm the monophyly of Cistaceae on the basis of plastid sequences and morphological synapomorphies.

Within Cistaceae, eight genera are recognised, including four in the Mediterranean (Cistus, Fumana, Helianthemum, Tuberaria), three in the temperate regions of North America (Crocanthemum, Hudsonia, Lechea), and one in tropical South America (Pakaraimaea). Seven of these eight genera can be grouped into five major lineages within Cistaceae (Pakaraimaea was not included in this study):

- A basal clade of the genus Fumana
- The New World clade of Lechea
- The Helianthemum s. l. clade, consisting of the sister groups Crocanthemum and Hudsonia from the New World, and Helianthemum s. s. from the Old World
- The Tuberaria clade
- A cohesive complex of Cistus species, including the former genus Halimium

== Cultivation and uses ==
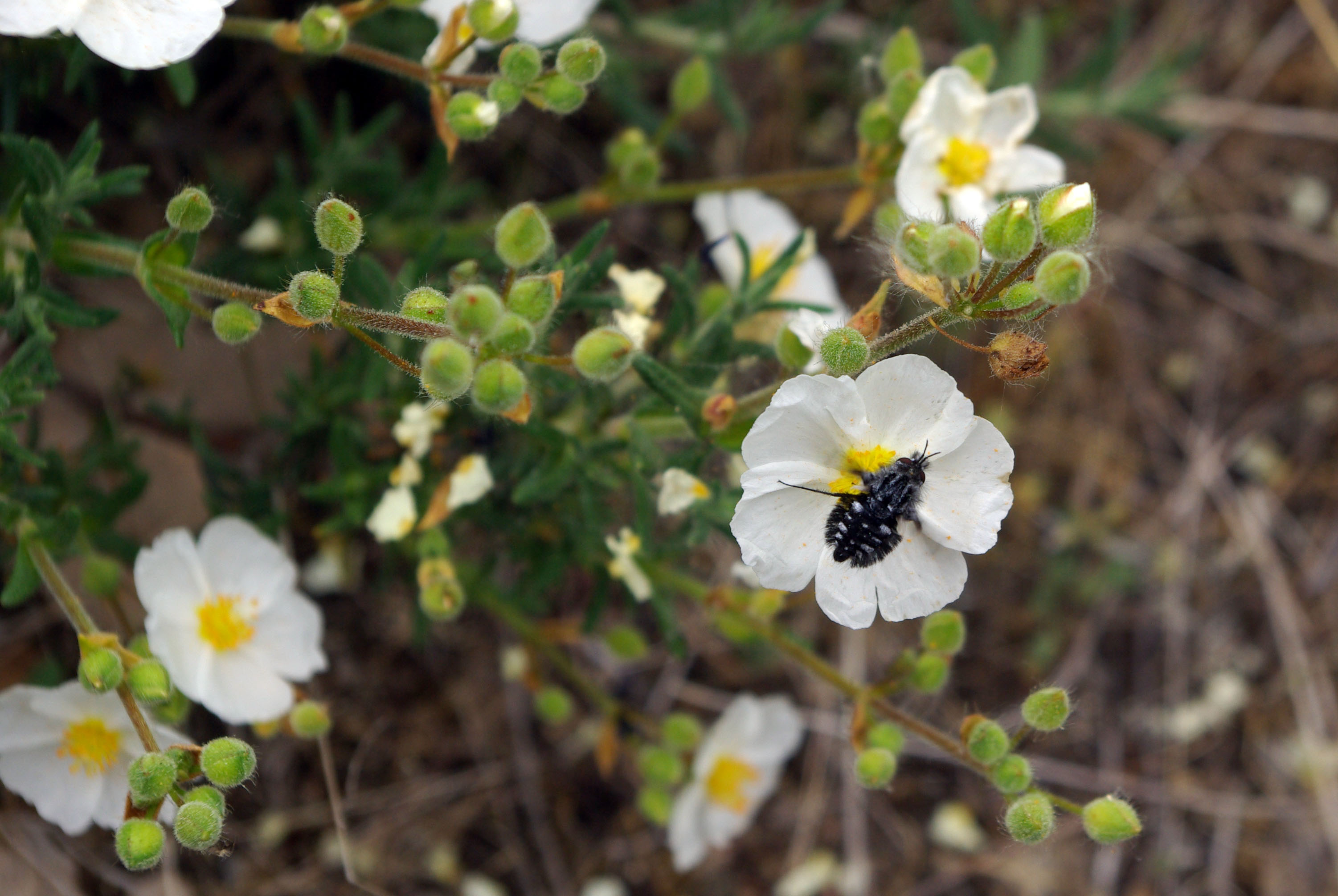
An Anthrax fly on rock-rose near Sotosalbos, Spain

Cistus (including Halimium) and Helianthemum are widely cultivated as ornamental plants. Their soil requirements are modest, and their hardiness allows some to survive well even the snowy winters of Northern Europe.

Some Cistus species, mostly C. ladanifer, are used to produce an aromatic resin, used in the perfume industry.

The ability of Cistaceae to create mycorrhizal relation with truffle mushroom (Tuber) prompted several studies about using them as host plants for truffle cultivation. The small size of Cistus shrubs could prove favourable, as they take up less space than traditional hosts, such as oak (Quercus) or pine (Pinus), and could thus lead to larger yield per field unit.

Cistaceae has been listed as one of the 38 plants used to prepare Bach flower remedies, a kind of alternative medicine promoted for its effect on health. However, according to Cancer Research UK, "there is no scientific evidence to prove that flower remedies can control, cure or prevent any type of disease, including cancer".

== Synonymous genera ==
These generic names inside Cistaceae were defined in various publications, but their members were synonymised with the eight accepted genera by later research.

- Anthelis
- Aphananthemum
- Atlanthemum
- Fumanopsis
- Halimium
- Helianthemon
- Hemiptelea
- Heteromeris
- Horanthes
- Horanthus
- Ladanium
- Ladanum
- Lecheoides
- Lechidium
- Ledonia
- Libanotis
- Planera
- Platonia
- Pomelina
- Psistina
- Psistus
- Rhodax
- Rhodocistus
- Stegitris
- Stephanocarpus
- Strobon
- Taeniostema
- Therocistus
- Trichasterophyllum
- Xolantha
- Xolanthes

== Fossil record ==
†Cistinocarpum roemeri, a middle Oligocene macrofossil from Germany is described as an ancestor of extant Cistaceae. Tuberaria fossil pollen have been found in Pliocene formations of Germany.
