= Cyclamen vernum =

The scientific name Cyclamen vernum has been applied to several species:

- Cyclamen balearicum
- Cyclamen repandum
- Cyclamen coum
- Cyclamen parviflorum
