= Spanish heath =

Spanish heath may refer to two species of plants within the genus Erica:

- Erica australis
- Erica lusitanica

== See also ==
- Coenonympha, a butterfly
