= Cyclamen europaeum =

Cyclamen europaeum is a scientific name that has been applied to three species:

Bright be thy Christmas tide!. No. 4, Cyclamen europaeum, published by C. Caswell, c. 1880.

- Cyclamen purpurascens
- Cyclamen hederifolium
- Cyclamen repandum
