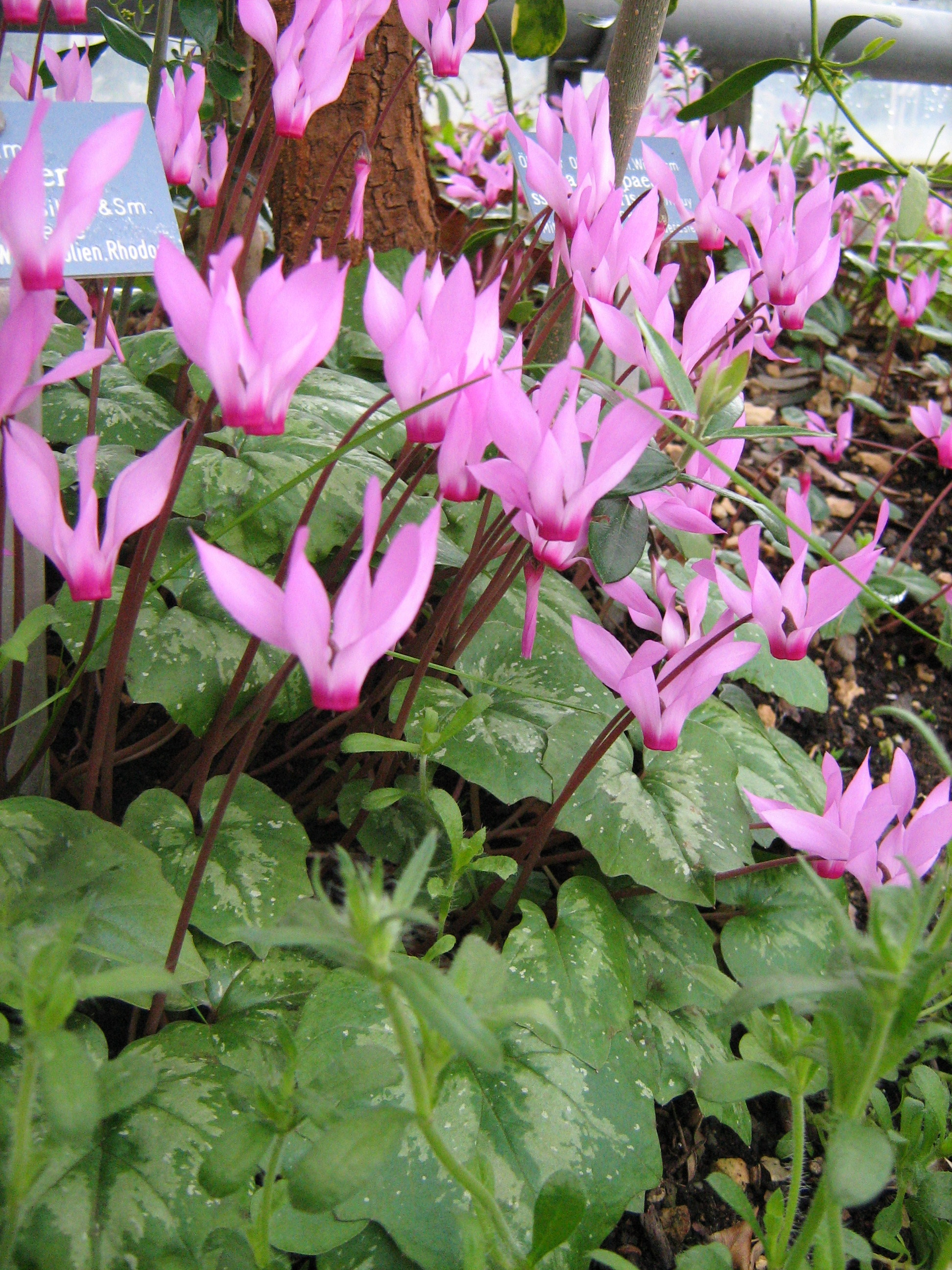
- In the Berne Botanical Gardens

Scientific classification
- Kingdom: Plantae
- Clade: Embryophytes
- Clade: Tracheophytes
- Clade: Spermatophytes
- Clade: Angiosperms
- Clade: Eudicots
- Clade: Asterids
- Order: Ericales
- Family: Primulaceae
- Genus: Cyclamen
- Species: C. rhodium

Binomial name
- Cyclamen rhodium Gorer ex O. Schwarz & Lepper

Subspecies
- See text.

= Cyclamen rhodium =

Species of flowering plant

Cyclamen rhodium (also called Cyclamen peloponnesiacum; once included in Cyclamen repandum) is a species of flowering plant in genus Cyclamen of the family Primulaceae, native to the Peloponnese, Rhodes, and southwestern Kos. It is a tuberous perennial growing to 10 cm (4 in), with mottled, heart-shaped leaves and pink flowers, darker carmine pink at the base, appearing in spring. Like all cyclamens, the flowers consist of five upswept, reflexed petals.

== Subspecies ==
There are three subspecies, distinguished by range and flower color.

Cyclamen rhodium subsp. rhodium is white or pale pink with a pink nose and grows in shaded woodland and shrubland on the islands of Rhodes and Kos.

Cyclamen rhodium subsp. peloponnesiacum J. Compton & Culham is pink with a deep carmine-pink mouth and grows in shaded woodland in the Taygetus Mountains in the southern Peloponnese and near Mt. Aroania in the north.

Cyclamen rhodium subsp. vividum J. Compton & Culham is deep carmine-magenta and grows in sunny areas on the southeastern coast of the Peloponnese.

== Former names ==
Cyclamen rhodium was once called Cyclamen peloponnesiacum; before that, it was included in Cyclamen repandum. The subspecies of Cyclamen rhodium were classified thus:

- Cyclamen repandum
  - subsp. rhodense
  - subsp. peloponnesiacum var. peloponnesiacum
  - subsp. peloponnesiacum var. vividum
- Cyclamen peloponnesiacum (Grey-Wilson) Kit Tan
  - subsp. rhodense
  - subsp. peloponnesiacum
  - subsp. vividum

== Gallery ==
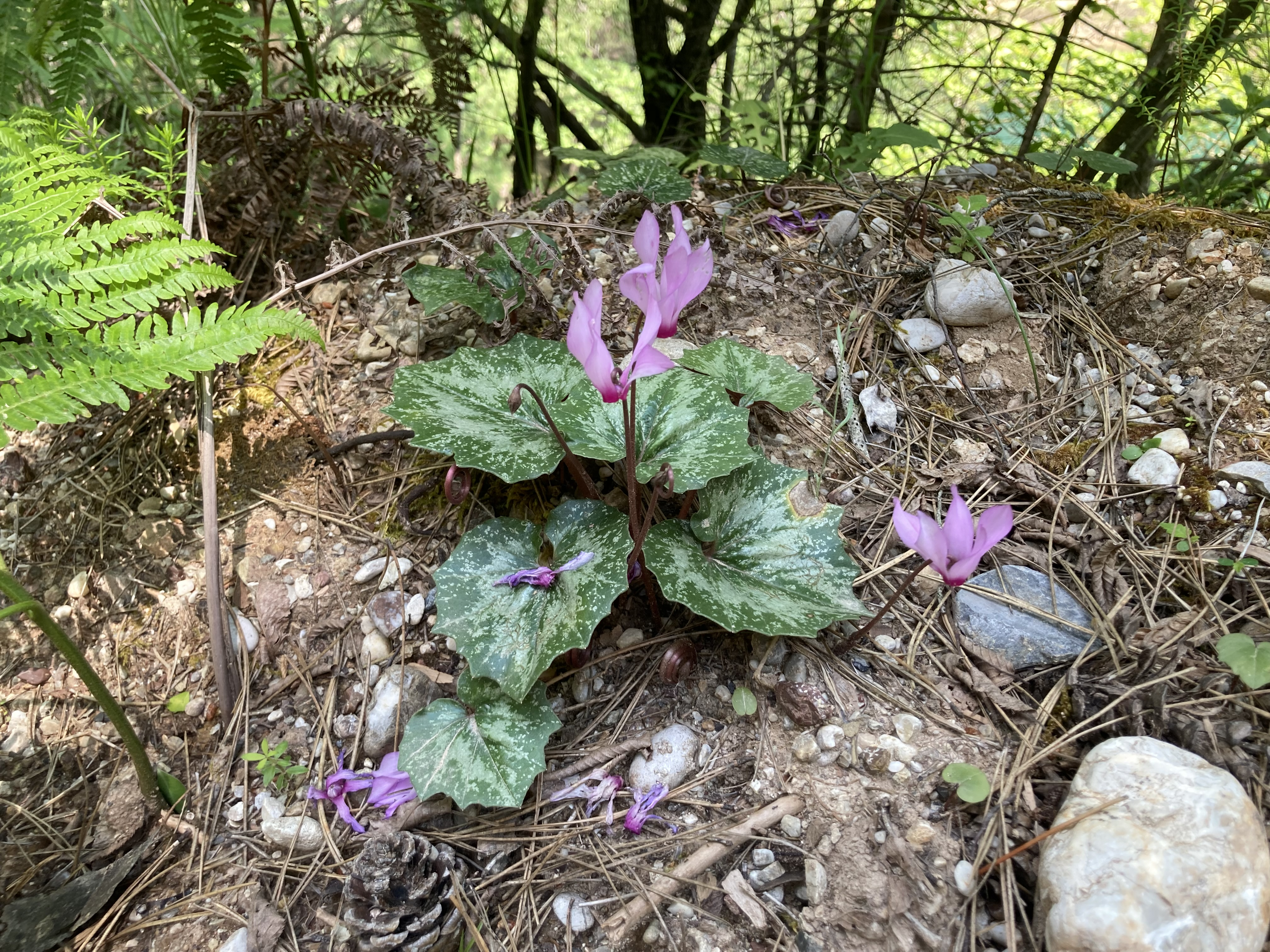
A wild specimen growing on Mount Chelmos.

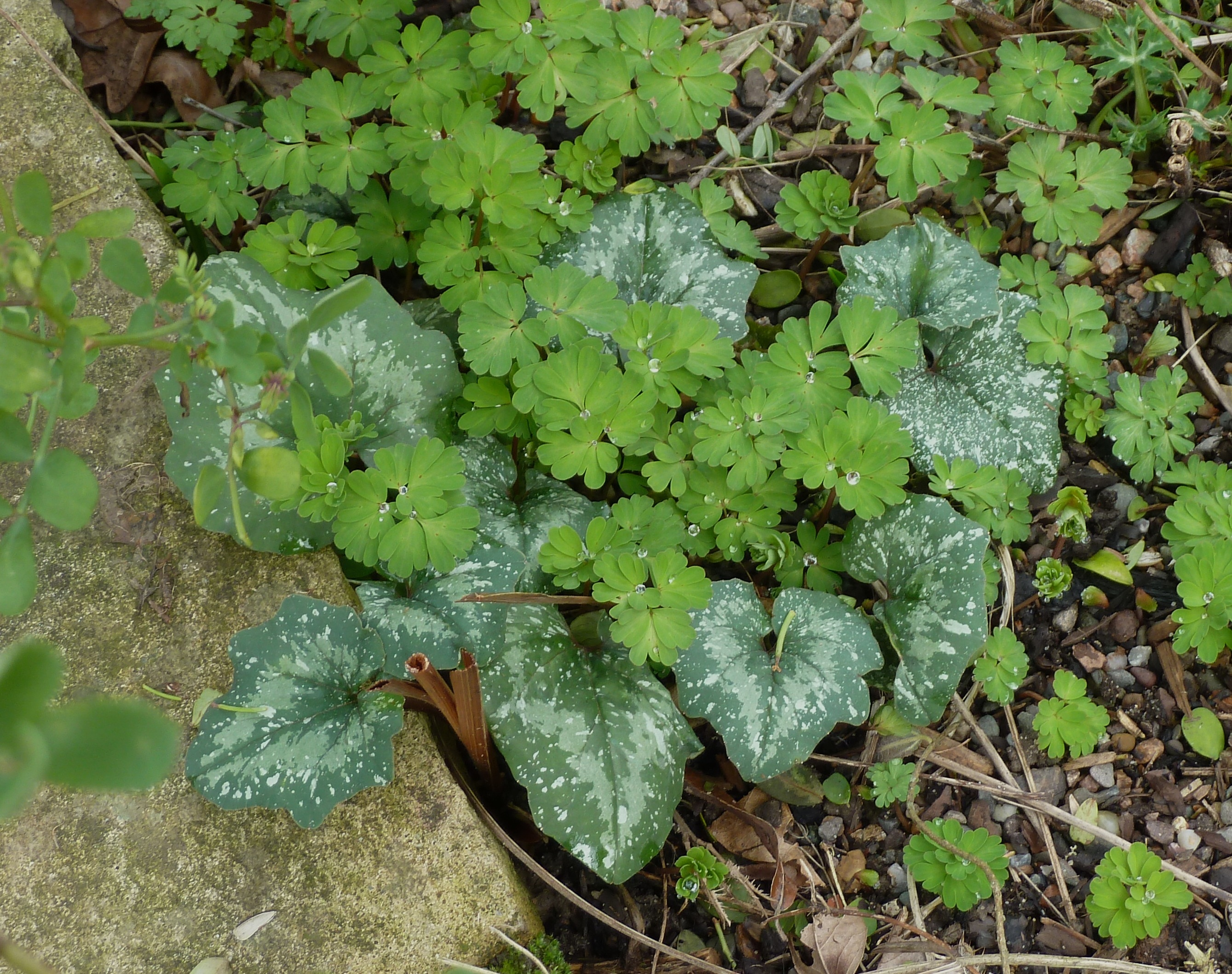
The leaves

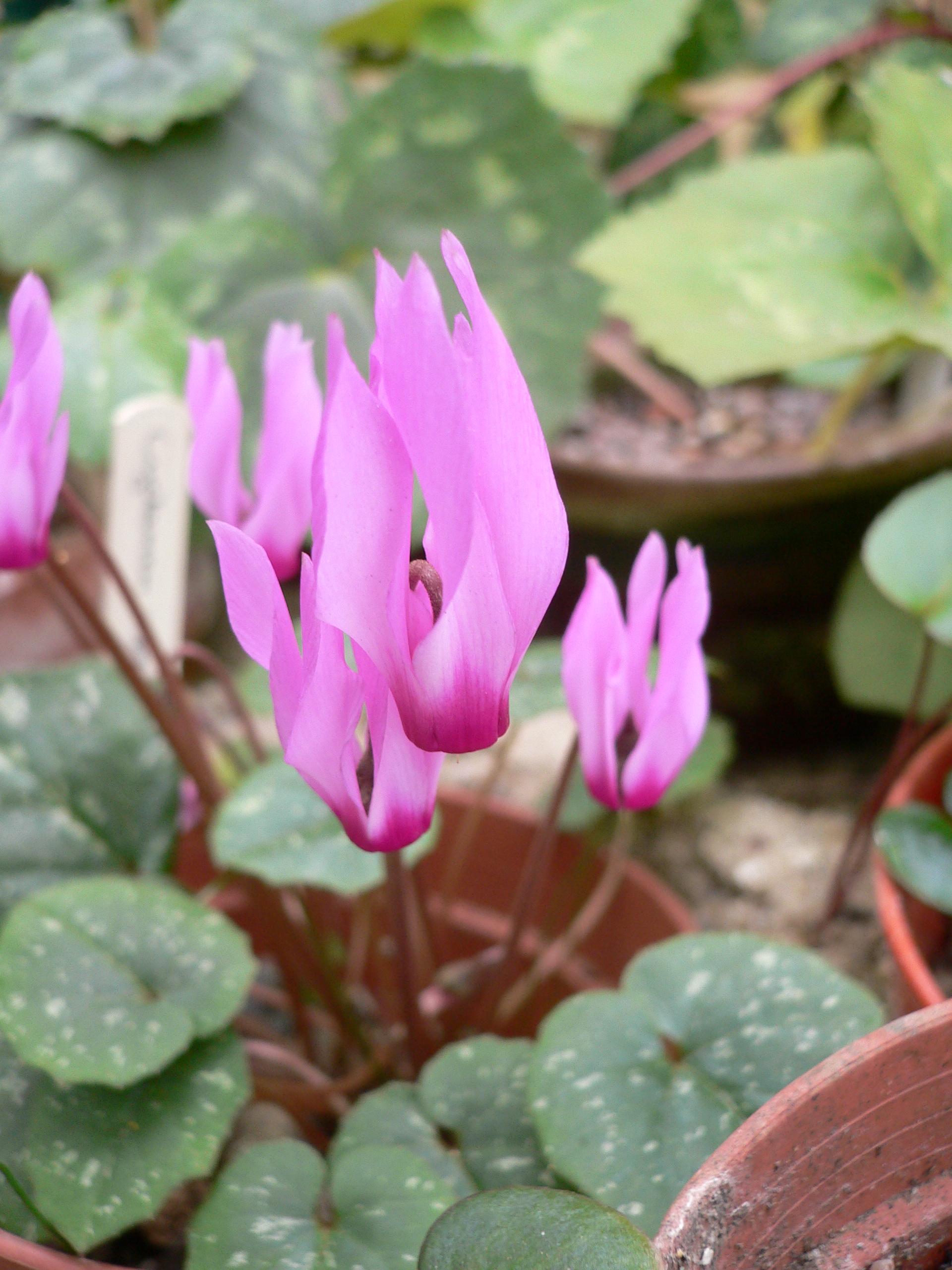
Cultivated flower

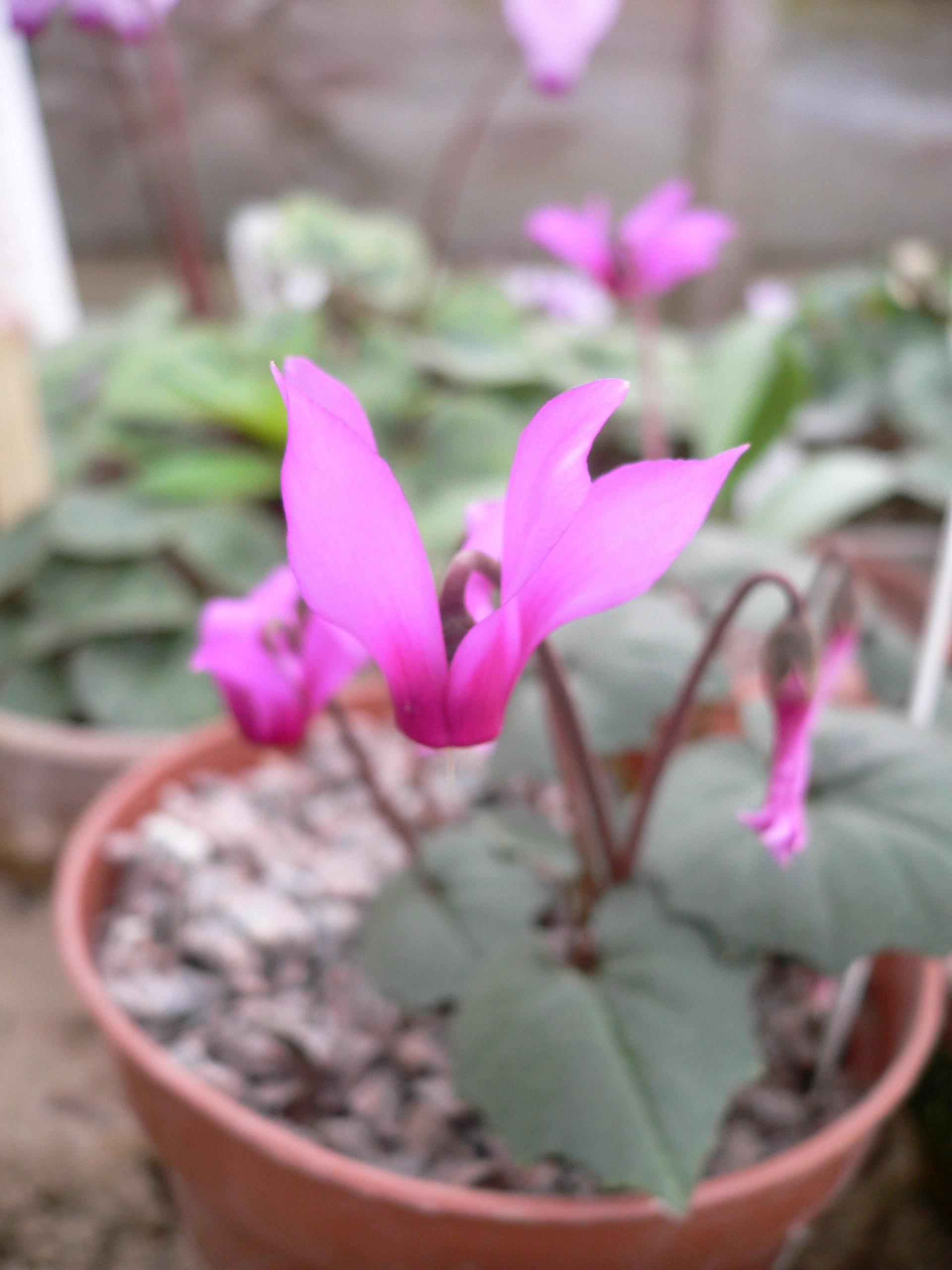
Cyclamen rhodium subsp. vividum
