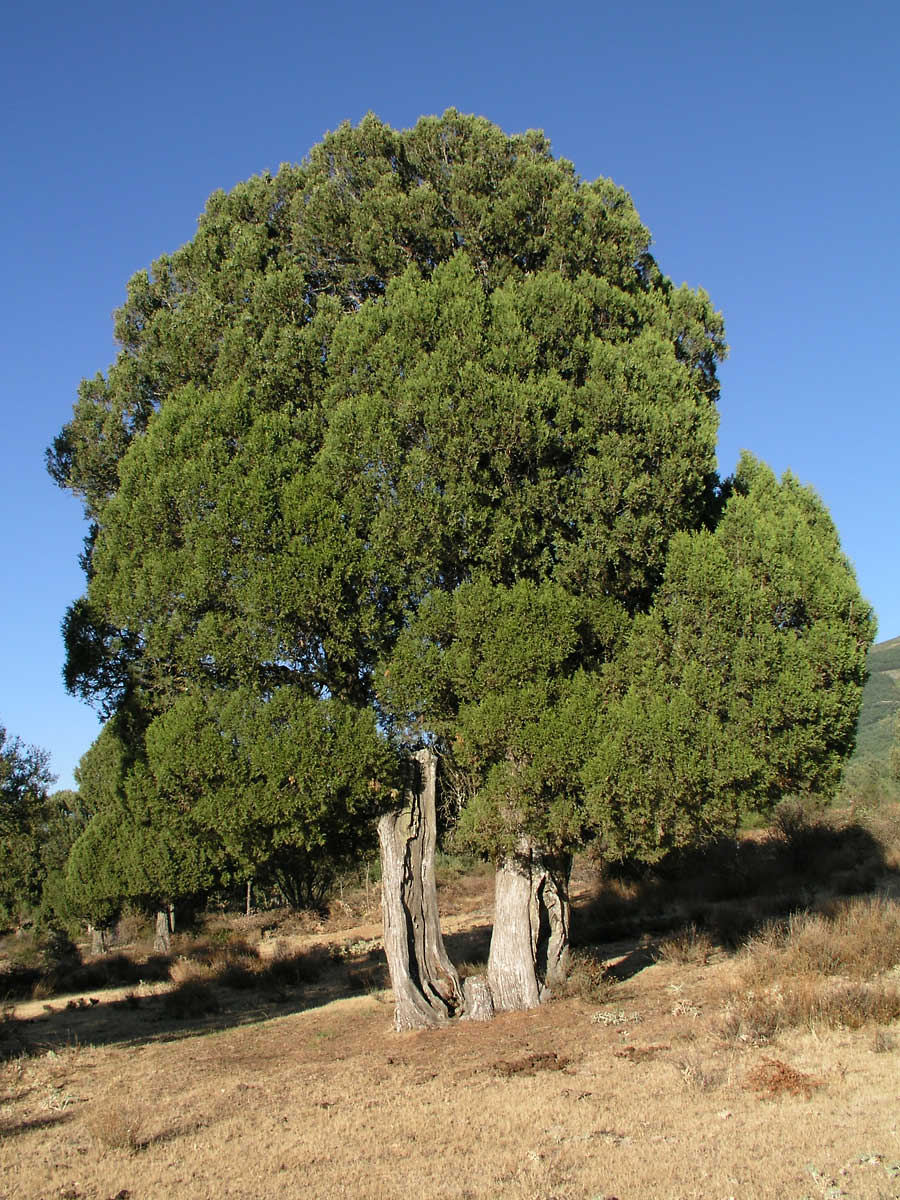
- Juniperus thurifera at Prádena de la Sierra (Segovia, Spain)

Conservation status
- Least Concern (IUCN 3.1)

Scientific classification
- Kingdom: Plantae
- Clade: Tracheophytes
- Clade: Gymnosperms
- Division: Pinophyta
- Class: Pinopsida
- Order: Cupressales
- Family: Cupressaceae
- Genus: Juniperus
- Section: Juniperus sect. Sabina
- Species: J. thurifera

Binomial name
- Juniperus thurifera L.
- Natural range

Synonyms
- Juniperus africana (Maire) Villar; Juniperus bonatiana Vis.; Juniperus cinerea Carrière; Juniperus gallica (Coincy) Rouy; Juniperus hispanica Mill.; Juniperus sabinoides Endl. nom. illeg.; Sabina pseudothurifera Antoine; Sabina thurifera (L.) Antoine

= Juniperus thurifera =

Spanish Juniper

Species of conifer

Juniperus thurifera is a species of juniper native to the mountains of the western Mediterranean region, from southern France (including Corsica) across eastern and central Spain to Morocco and locally in northern Algeria.

The name thurifera comes from the Latin turifer, "producer/bearer of incense".

It is a large shrub or tree reaching 6–20 metres (20–66 feet) tall, with a trunk up to 2 m (6 1/2 ft) in diameter and a broadly conical to rounded or irregular crown. The foliage is strongly aromatic with a spicy-resinous scent. The leaves are of two forms: juvenile needle-like leaves 8–10 millimetres (5/16–3/8 inch) long on seedlings and irregularly on adult plants, and adult-scale leaves 0.6–3 mm long on older plants; they are arranged in decussate opposite pairs. It is dioecious with separate male and female plants. The cones are berry-like, 7–12 mm in diameter, blue-black with a whitish waxy bloom, and contain 1–4 seeds; they are mature in about 18 months. The male cones are 3–4 mm long, and shed their pollen in early spring.

There are two varieties, regarded as distinct by some authors, but not by others:

- Juniperus thurifera var. thurifera. Spain, France. Mature cones 8–12 mm, with 2–4 seeds.
- Juniperus thurifera var. africana Maire. Morocco, Algeria. Mature cones 7–8 mm, with 1–2 seeds.

Overall, the species is not considered threatened with healthy population in Spain; however, the African population is threatened by severe overgrazing, mainly by goats, and is listed as Endangered.

The largest Spanish Juniper forest in Europe is in the Sierra de Solorio.

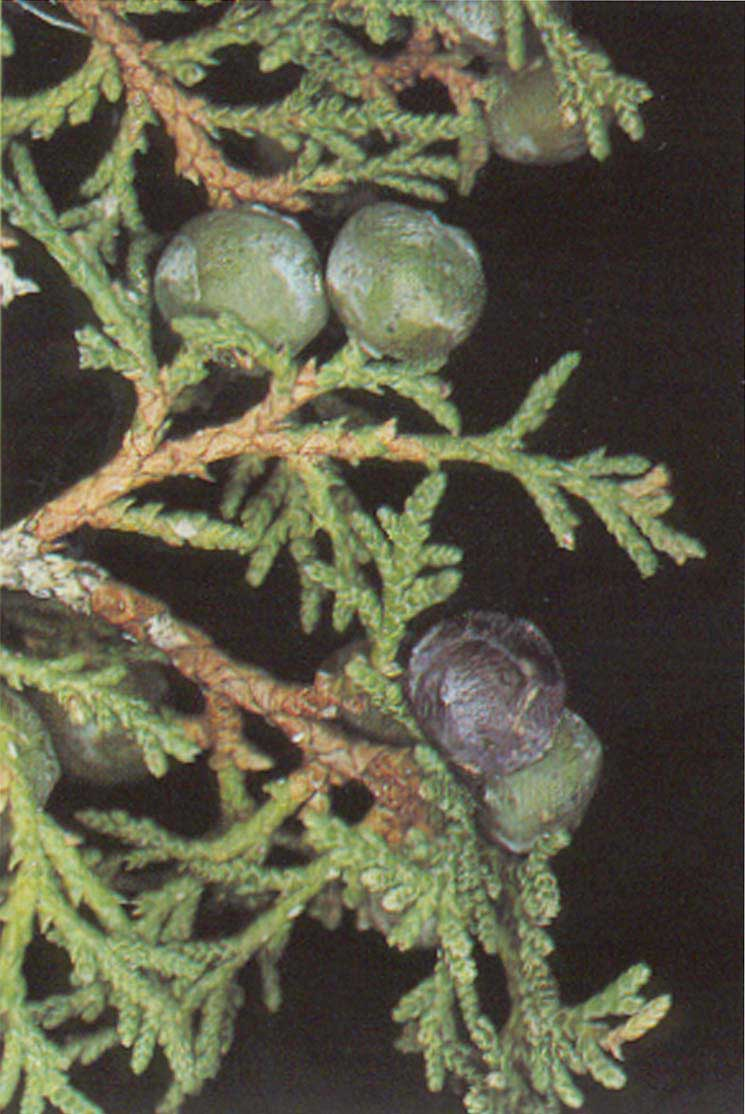
Twigs with berries
