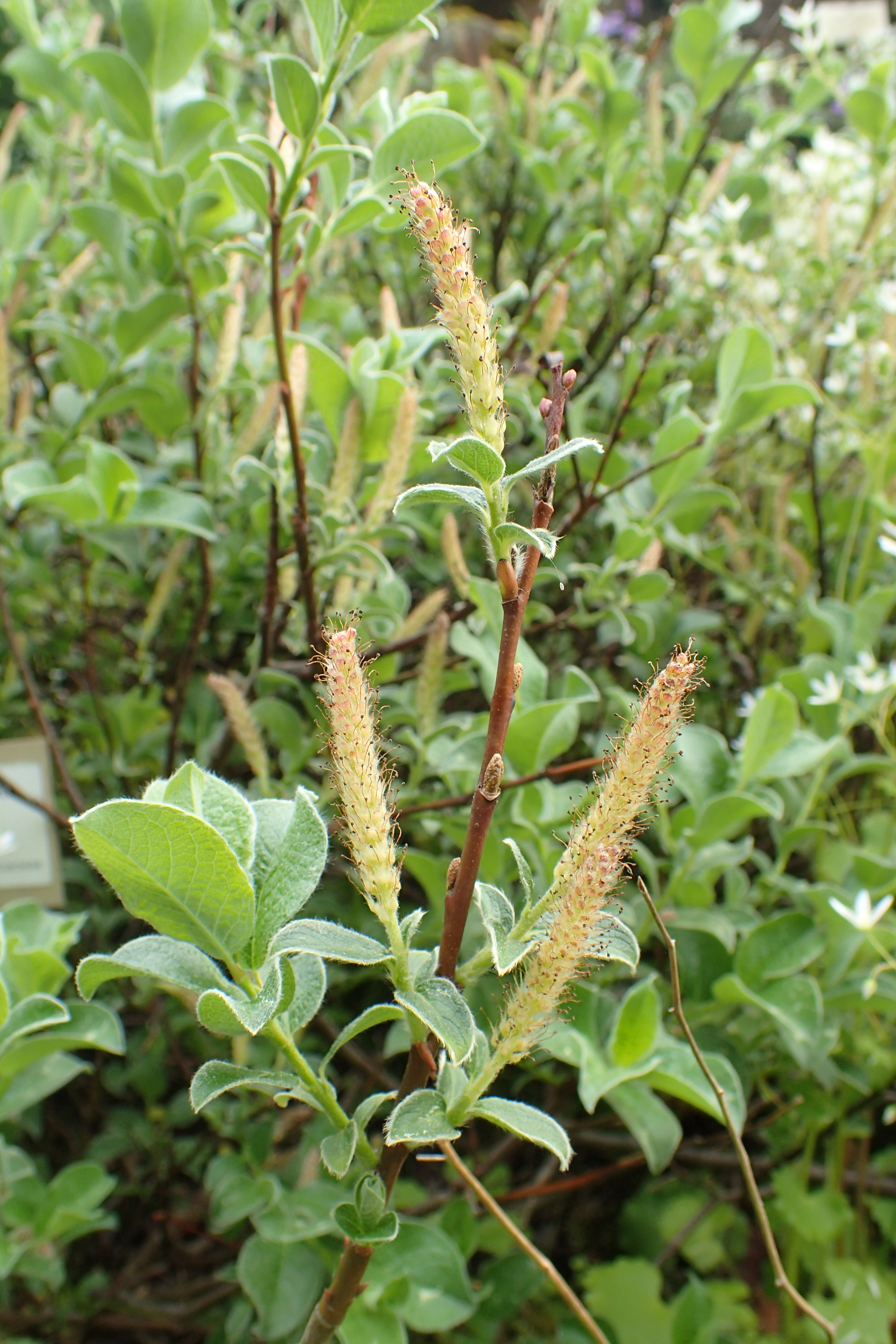
- Flowers
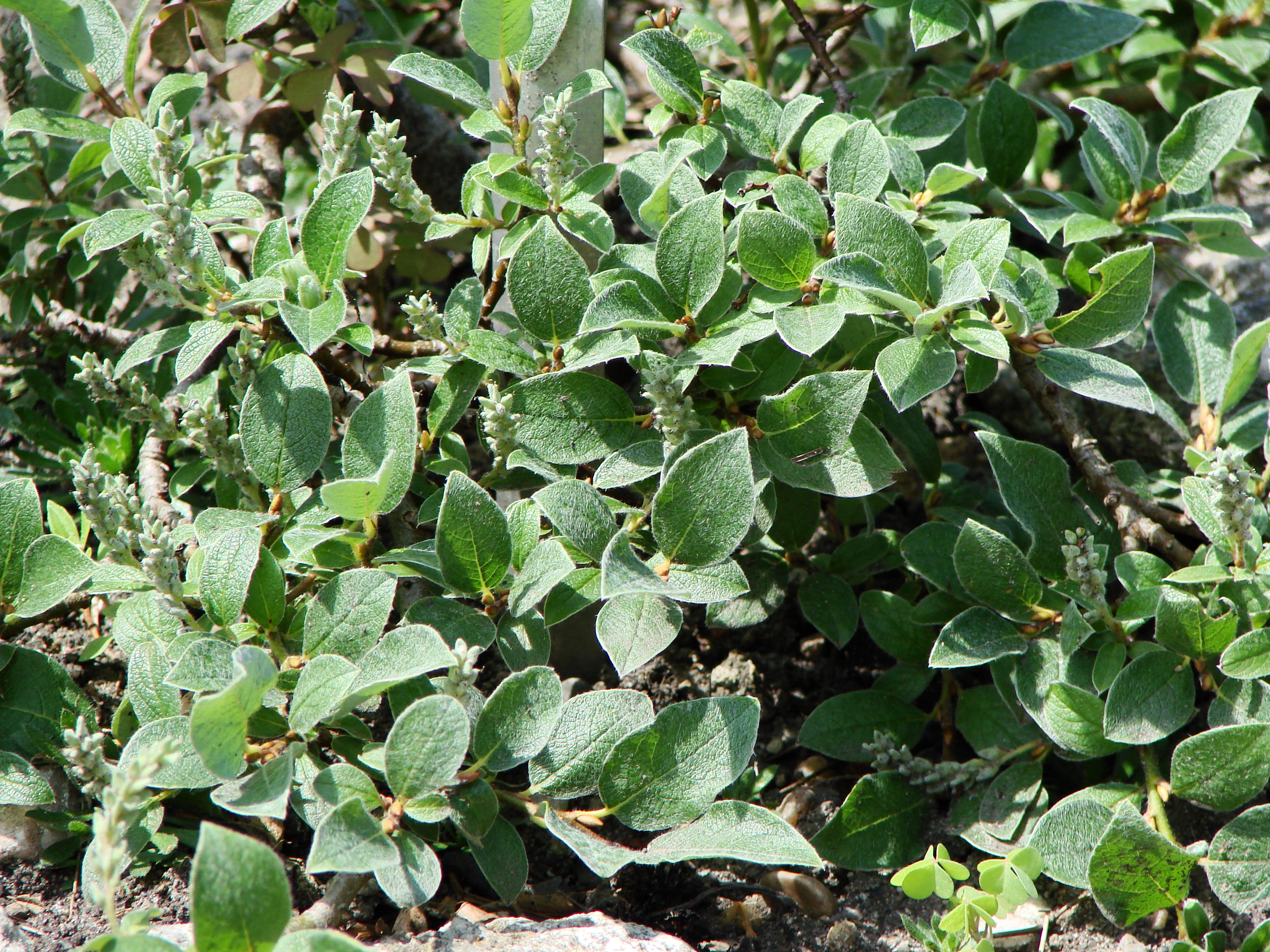
- Habit

Scientific classification
- Kingdom: Plantae
- Clade: Tracheophytes
- Clade: Angiosperms
- Clade: Eudicots
- Clade: Rosids
- Order: Malpighiales
- Family: Salicaceae
- Genus: Salix
- Species: S. pyrenaica

Binomial name
- Salix pyrenaica Gouan

Synonyms
- Salix alpestris Andersson; Salix × ambigua var. longifolia Schultz; Salix blyttii A.Kern.; Salix ciliata DC.; Salix ovata Ser.; Vimen pyrenaica (Gouan) Raf.

= Salix pyrenaica =

Species of plant in the willow family

Salix pyrenaica, the Pyrenean willow, is a species of flowering plant in the family Salicaceae, native to the Pyrenees and Cantabrian Mountains. A shrub or subshrub with procumbent main stems, and ascending branches usually reaching 1.5 ft (0.5 m), it is occasionally available in commerce.
