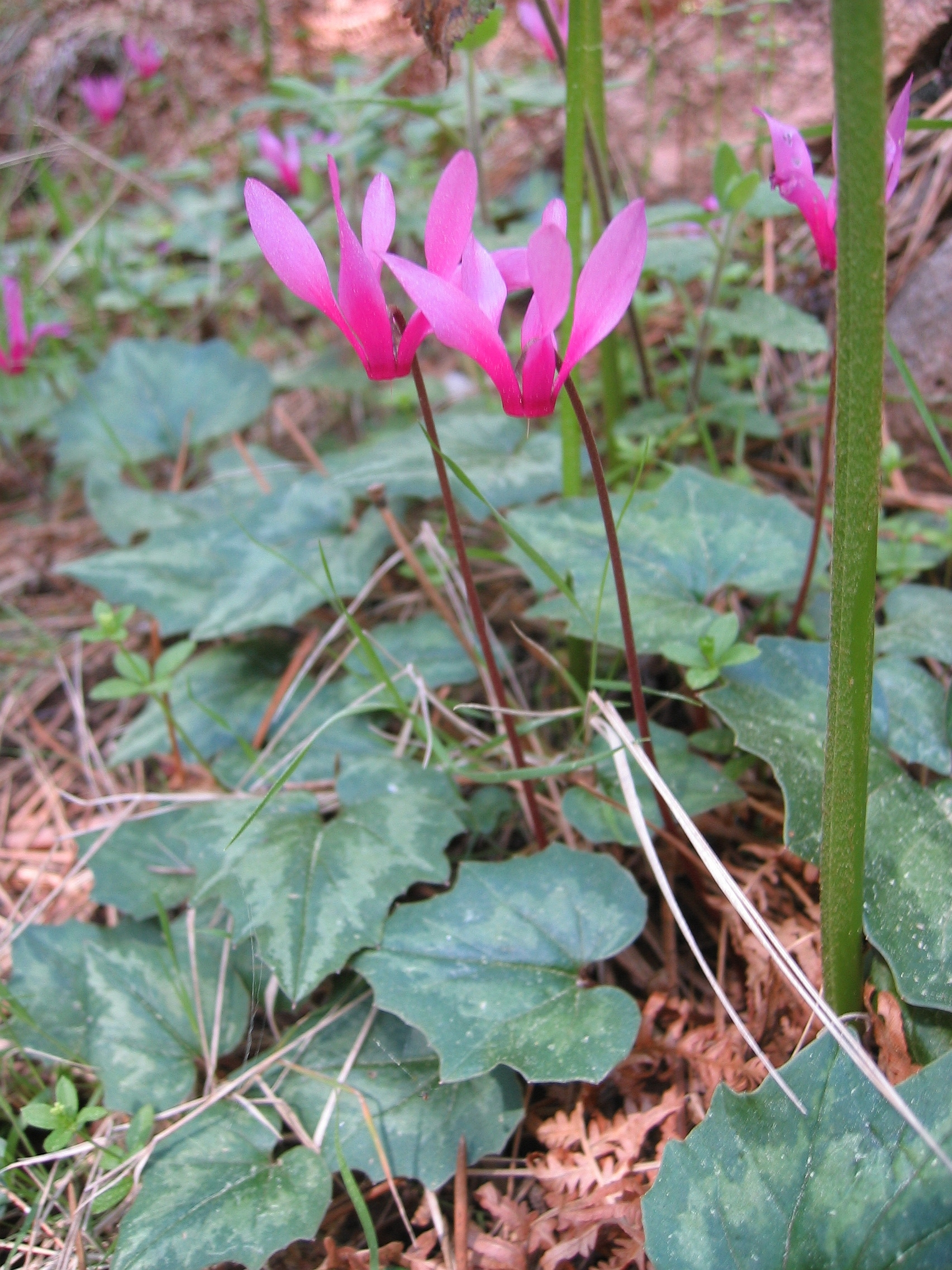

Scientific classification
- Kingdom: Plantae
- Clade: Embryophytes
- Clade: Tracheophytes
- Clade: Spermatophytes
- Clade: Angiosperms
- Clade: Eudicots
- Clade: Asterids
- Order: Ericales
- Family: Primulaceae
- Genus: Cyclamen
- Subgenus: C. subg. Psilanthum
- Species: C. repandum

Binomial name
- Cyclamen repandum Sm.

= Cyclamen repandum =

Species of flowering plant in the primrose family

Cyclamen repandum, the spring sowbread, is a species of flowering plant in the family Primulaceae, native to southern Europe and some Mediterranean islands. It is the most widespread of a group of cyclamens (genus Cyclamen subgenus Psilanthum) with wide, heart-shaped leaves, often coarsely toothed or lobed, and late spring-blooming flowers with long, slender petals.

== Etymology ==
The name of the subgenus, Psilanthum, comes from Ancient Greek psilós "bare" and ánthos "flower". The species name repandum is Latin for "bent back" or "turned up".

== Description ==
Cyclamen repandum grows in rocky areas, shrubland, and woodland near the Mediterranean from southeastern France through Italy to Serbia and on Corsica, Sardinia, and Sicily. The tuber of the C. repandum group roots only from the center of the bottom. Leaves are dark green with a lighter arrowhead pattern, not speckled. Flowers are deep carmine-pink or white, without a darker nose. They lack the auricles present in Cyclamen hederifolium.

== Similar species ==
The Cyclamen repandum group also includes C. rhodium, C. balearicum, and C. creticum.

== Hybrids ==
When species of the Cyclamen repandum group are growing together, hybrids can emerge:

- Cyclamen × meiklei Grey-Wilson (C. creticum × C. repandum)
- Cyclamen × saundersii Grey-Wilson (C. repandium × C. balearicum)
- Cyclamen creticum × Cyclamen balearicum

== Cultivation ==
Cyclamen repandum is a deciduous plant that has a hardiness rating of H4 (This refers to the UK growing conditions, H4 being hardy through most of the UK and can withstand temperatures down to −5 to −10 °C (23 to 14 °F)). It requires partial shade and can grow in chalk, clay, sand or loam. It can grow in any pH level; acid, alkaline or neutral. C. repandum can grow to an ultimate height of 10 cm (3.9 in) and can take anywhere between 2–5 years to reach this height.

The subspecies C. repandum subsp. repandum (wavy-edged cyclamen) has gained the Royal Horticultural Society's Award of Garden Merit (confirmed 2017).
