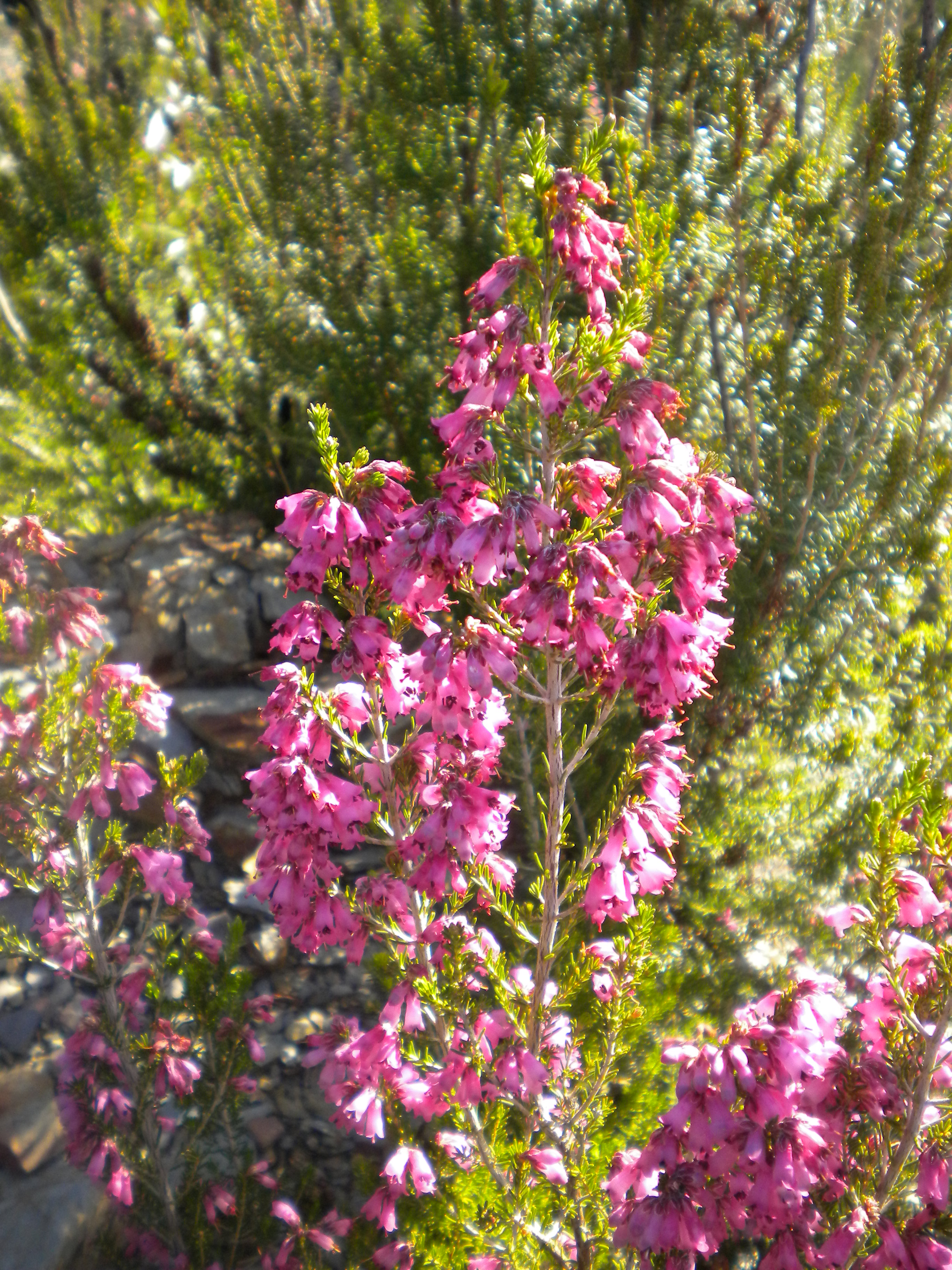

Scientific classification
- Kingdom: Plantae
- Clade: Tracheophytes
- Clade: Angiosperms
- Clade: Eudicots
- Clade: Asterids
- Order: Ericales
- Family: Ericaceae
- Genus: Erica
- Species: E. australis

Binomial name
- Erica australis L.

= Erica australis =

Species of flowering plant

Erica australis, the Spanish heath or Southern tree heath, is a European species of flowering plant in the family Ericaceae.

It is a bushy evergreen shrub growing to 2 metres (6 1/2 feet) tall and broad, with tiny needle-like leaves and pink to purple bell-shaped flowers in late spring. As a calcifuge, it requires sharply drained acidic soil in full sun. It is hardy down to −10 °C (14 °F).

The Latin specific epithet australis means 'southern', referring to its native habitat of southern Europe, including the western Iberian Peninsula (Portugal and Western Spain) as well as Northwest Africa (in Morocco).

This plant is cultivated as an ornamental and has produced numerous forms and cultivars, gaining the Royal Horticultural Society's Award of Garden Merit for E. australis 'Mr Robert'.
