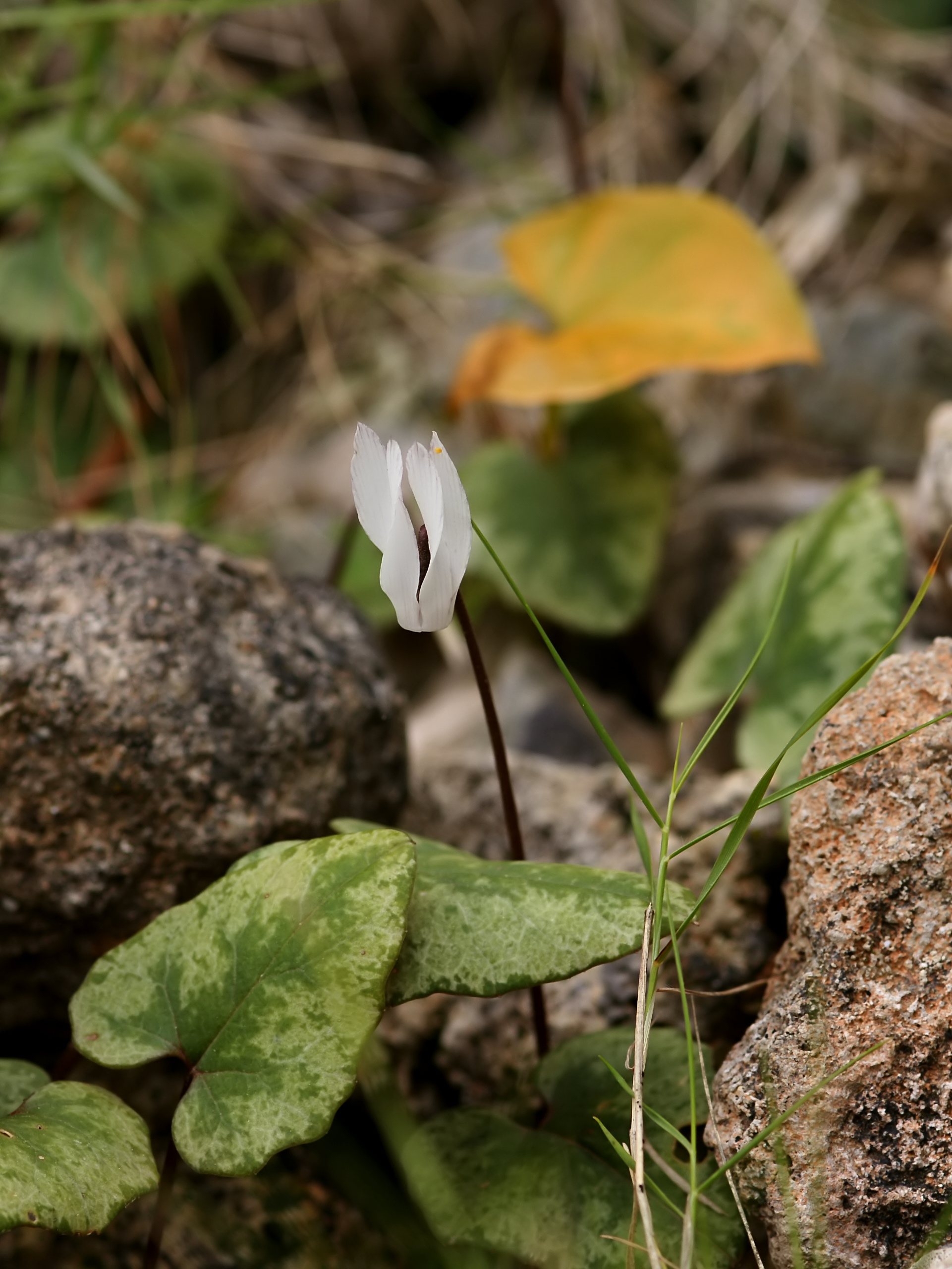

Scientific classification
- Kingdom: Plantae
- Clade: Tracheophytes
- Clade: Angiosperms
- Clade: Eudicots
- Clade: Asterids
- Order: Ericales
- Family: Primulaceae
- Genus: Cyclamen
- Subgenus: C. subg. Psilanthum
- Species: C. balearicum

Binomial name
- Cyclamen balearicum Willk.

= Cyclamen balearicum =

Species of flowering plant

Cyclamen balearicum, the Majorca or Balearic cyclamen, St. Peter's violet or sowbread, is a perennial plant growing from a tuber, native to shady areas in woodland of short evergreen trees and shrubs (holm oak, Kermes oak, box) up to 1,443 m (4,734 ft) above sea level in the Balearic Islands and in isolated locations in France from the Pyrenees to the Rhone valley.

The flowers bloom in spring, are fragrant, and have five upswept white petals. The leaves are arrowhead-shaped and blue-green mottled with silver, with less sharply defined variegation than other cyclamens.
