= Ahmed Mumin Warfa =

Somali botanist

Prof. Dr. Ahmed Mumin Warfa Rector of the Zamzam University of Science and Technology
- أحمد مومين وارفا
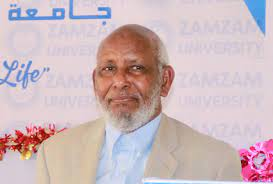
- Born: Somalia
- Education: Uppsala University University of Camerino Somali National University
- Occupation: Scientist
- Known for: Discovering Cyclamen somalense

Ahmed Mumin Warfa (Somali: Axmed Mumiin Warfa, Arabic: أحمد مومين وارفا) was a Somali scientist specializing in botany, who with his colleague Mats Thulin discovered the species Cyclamen somalense. He served as president (rector) of the Zamzam University of Science and Technology from 2020 until his death.

== Biography ==
=== Somalia ===
Warfa was a professor at the Somali National University, where he taught biology and agriculture. He also regularly conducted research with colleagues in Somalia, where he jointly discovered several endemic species, notably in the northeastern Bari region.

With the outbreak of the civil war in 1991 and the closure of the university, Ahmed became a peacemaker, working as a translator for the United Nations and setting up councils for the reconciliation process in Addis Ababa, Ethiopia. His efforts brought him into conflict with several local militia leaders. In 1994, he narrowly escaped an assassination attempt.

His children are Sumaya Mumin, Ismail Mumin, Daud Ahmed Mumin, Hibo Mumin, Farah Mumin, Mohamed Mumin, Aisha Mumin, Yusuf Mumin, Dahir Mumin, Halima Mumin, Fadumo Mumin, and Fadumo Mumin.

=== United States ===
Warfa subsequently left Somalia for Nairobi, Kenya, from where he then emigrated to the United States, where he taught biology at Salt Lake Community College and Brigham Young University in Utah. He continued to attend conferences on herbology as a keynote speaker or contributor.

Warfa was also actively involved in the affairs of Somalia and the Somali diaspora, whether as a reconciliator working for the UN and the Somali President or as an activist raising funds for projects such as Hiiraan University.

=== Back to Somalia ===
In 2020, Warfa returned to Mogadishu to serve as rector of the Zamzam University of Science and Technology.

Professor Warfa died of complications from COVID-19 on 15 March 2021 in Mogadishu.
