= Cyclamen neapolitanum =

Cyclamen neapolitanum usually refers to Cyclamen hederifolium.

It may also refer to:

- Cyclamen africanum
- Cyclamen cyprium
