= Cyclamen Ridge =

Coordinates: 50.06677°N 114.55202°W

Cyclamen Ridge is a ridge in Alberta, Canada.

Cyclamen Ridge takes its name from the cyclamen flower.
