= Cyclamen maritimum =

Scientific classification
- Kingdom: Plantae
- Clade: Tracheophytes
- Clade: Angiosperms
- Clade: Eudicots
- Clade: Asterids
- Order: Ericales
- Family: Primulaceae
- Genus: Cyclamen
- Species: C. maritimum

Binomial name
- Cyclamen maritimum Hildebr.

Synonyms
- Cyclamen cyprograecum E.Mutch & N.Mutch; Cyclamen graecum subsp. anatolicum Ietsw.; Cyclamen pseudomaritimum Hildebr.

Species of flowering plant

Cyclamen maritimum is a species of flowering plant in the family Primulaceae. It is a tuberous geophyte native to Greece's east Aegean Islands, southwestern and southern Turkey, and northern Cyprus in the eastern Mediterranean.
