= Cyclamen brulloi =

Scientific classification
- Kingdom: Plantae
- Clade: Tracheophytes
- Clade: Angiosperms
- Clade: Eudicots
- Clade: Asterids
- Order: Ericales
- Family: Primulaceae
- Genus: Cyclamen
- Species: C. brulloi

Binomial name
- Cyclamen brulloi Cambria, Giusso, Miniss., Tavilla & Salmeri
- It is endemic to Sicily, Italy

Species of plant in the family Primulaceae

Cyclamen brulloi is a species of flowering plant in the family Primulaceae. It is a tuberous geophyte endemic to the Italian island of Sicily.

== Description ==
=== Vegetative characteristics ===
Cyclamen brulloi is a tuberous, geophytic, plant with dark brown, depressed-globose, up to 30 cm wide tubers. The thin, fibrous roots emerge from the entire surface of the tuber.

=== Generative characteristics ===
The pink or white flowers with reflexed petals are inodorous. The thick, fleshy, purple, reddish-brown, or green, hairy, horizontal to erect pedicels are 10–20 cm long. The globose, 13–15 mm wide capsule fruit with a persistent calyx and a coiled pedicel bears black, irregularly shaped, 3.4–6.2 mm wide seeds with a lumpy surface.

=== Cytology ===
The chromosome count is 2n = 68.

== Taxonomy ==
It was described by Salvatore Cambria, Gianpietro Giusso, Pietro Minissale, Gianmarco Tavilla, and Cristina Salmeri in 2024. The type specimen was collected on the 8 October 2016 by S. Cambria near Castellamare del Golfo (Trapani), Bocca di Cinturino, Sicily, Italy, at an elevation of 207 m above sea level.

=== Etymology ===
The specific epithet brulloi honours the botanist Salvatore Brullo.

== Distribution and habitat ==
It is endemic to Sicily, Italy, where it occurs in bright or shaded rocky terrain in limestone facing the sea or the slopes of narrow gorges, in shrubland, or in inland areas at elevations of 0–300 m above sea level.

== Conservation ==
It is likely an endangered species.
