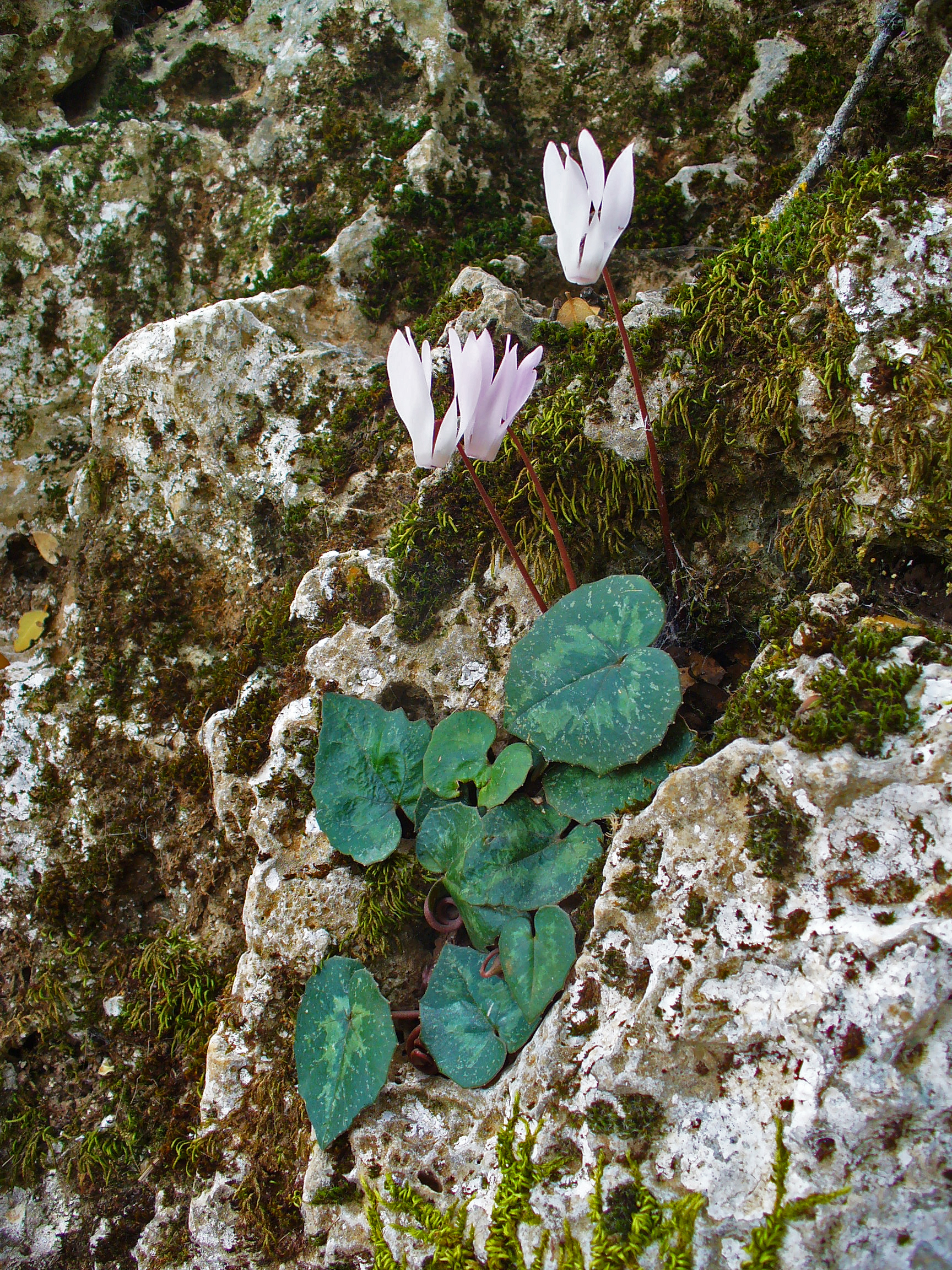
- Growing on a rockface

Scientific classification
- Kingdom: Plantae
- Clade: Tracheophytes
- Clade: Angiosperms
- Clade: Eudicots
- Clade: Asterids
- Order: Ericales
- Family: Primulaceae
- Genus: Cyclamen
- Subgenus: C. subg. Psilanthum
- Species: C. creticum

Binomial name
- Cyclamen creticum (Dörfl.) Hildebr.

= Cyclamen creticum =

Species of flowering plant

Cyclamen creticum, commonly known as Cretan sowbread, is a small perennial herb endemic to Crete and Karpathos. It is closely related to Cyclamen repandum, and both are placed in subgenus Psilanthum. Some authorities consider C. creticum to be a subspecies of C. repandum.

== Etymology ==
The name of the subgenus, Psilanthum, comes from Ancient Greek: psilós "bare" and ánthos "flower".

== Description ==
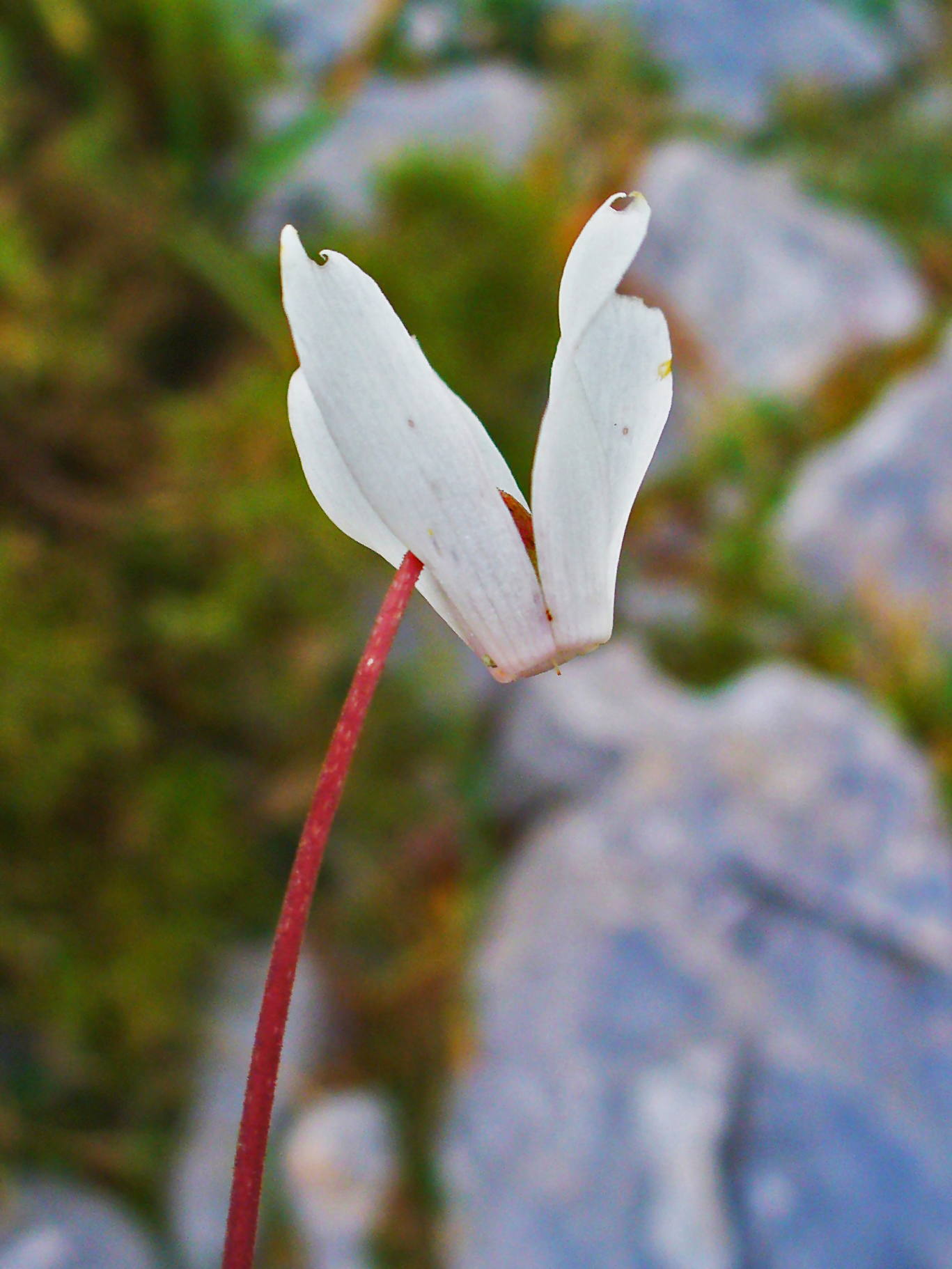
Flower of Cyclamen creticum forma creticum

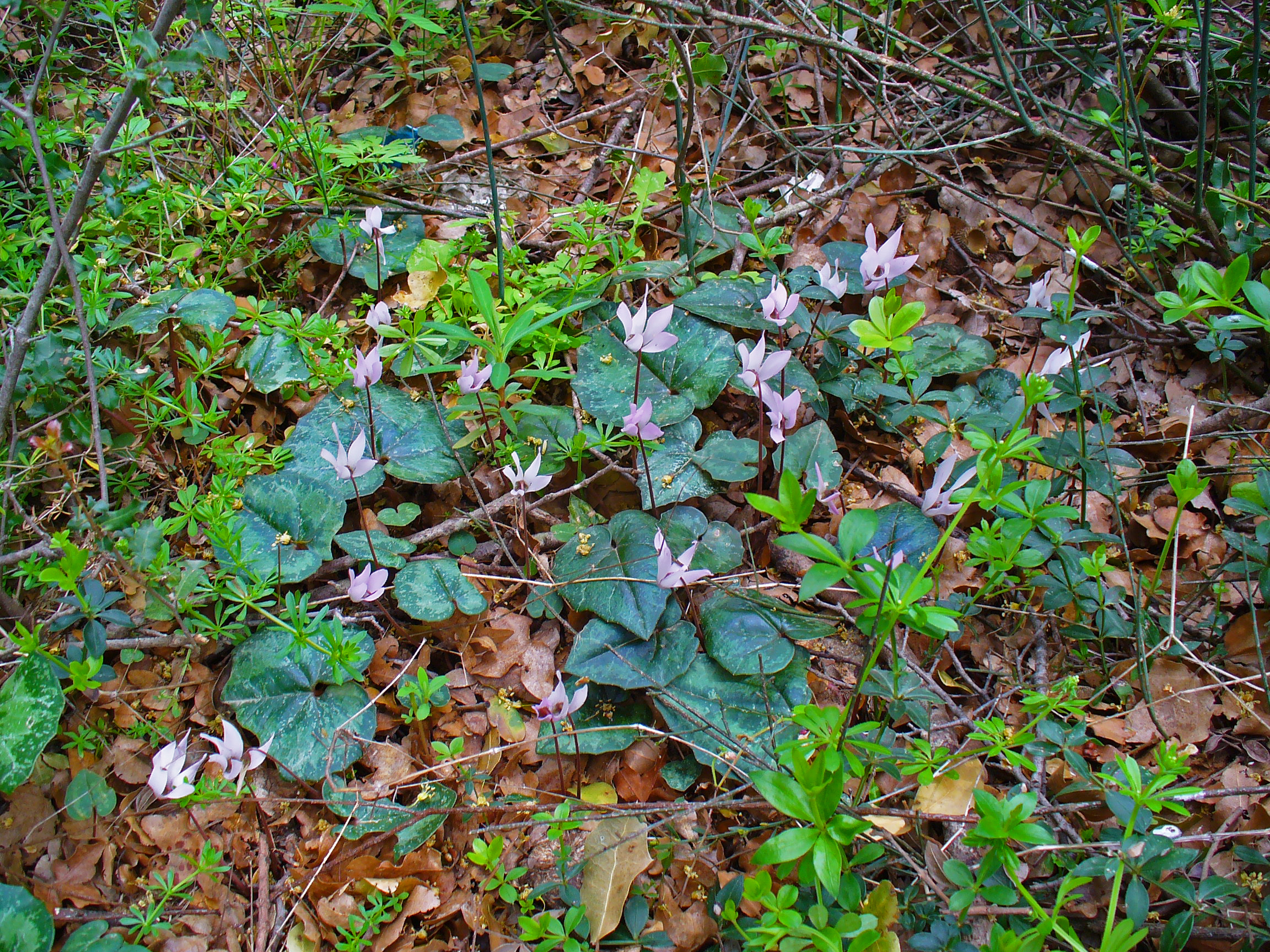

Cyclamen creticum is a small plant that grows to heights of about 15 cm (5.9 in). It is a long-lived perennial herb with a tuberous rootstock. They tend to grow on rocky places, stream and river banks, gullies, or under bushes. Can be described as a tender plant; prefers to grow in the shade protected from the sun.

Leaf - Heart-shaped, cordate leaves, often coarsely toothed, of dark-green color with a red-purple back. Cloudy or netted silvery markings can be seen on the leaf.

Flower - Within the same species, C. creticum flowers come in two distinguished forms: Forma creticum and Forma pallide-roseum.

Forma creticum flowers are completely white.
Forma pallide-roseum flowers are white to light pink with hints of pale pink infused.

In its habitat, there is no true demarcation of these two forms. Forma creticum is by far the more common form. The flowers are hermaphroditic and solitary (not part of an inflorescence). Strongly fragrant but produces no nectar. The corolla is formed by five petals, which are long and slender with an absence of auricles. Flowers bloom around April to May.

Stalk - The stalk is long, thin, and red.

== Distribution ==
Cyclamen creticum is endemic to the Greek Islands of Crete and Karpathos. It is known to grow on two locations in Karpathos whereas it is abundantly found all over Crete, growing at sea level to 1300m.

== Reproduction ==
Cyclamen creticum rarely self-fertilizes due to approach herkogamy, where the stigma is above the level of the anthers. Insect pollinators of C. creticum include hoverflies and bumblebees.
