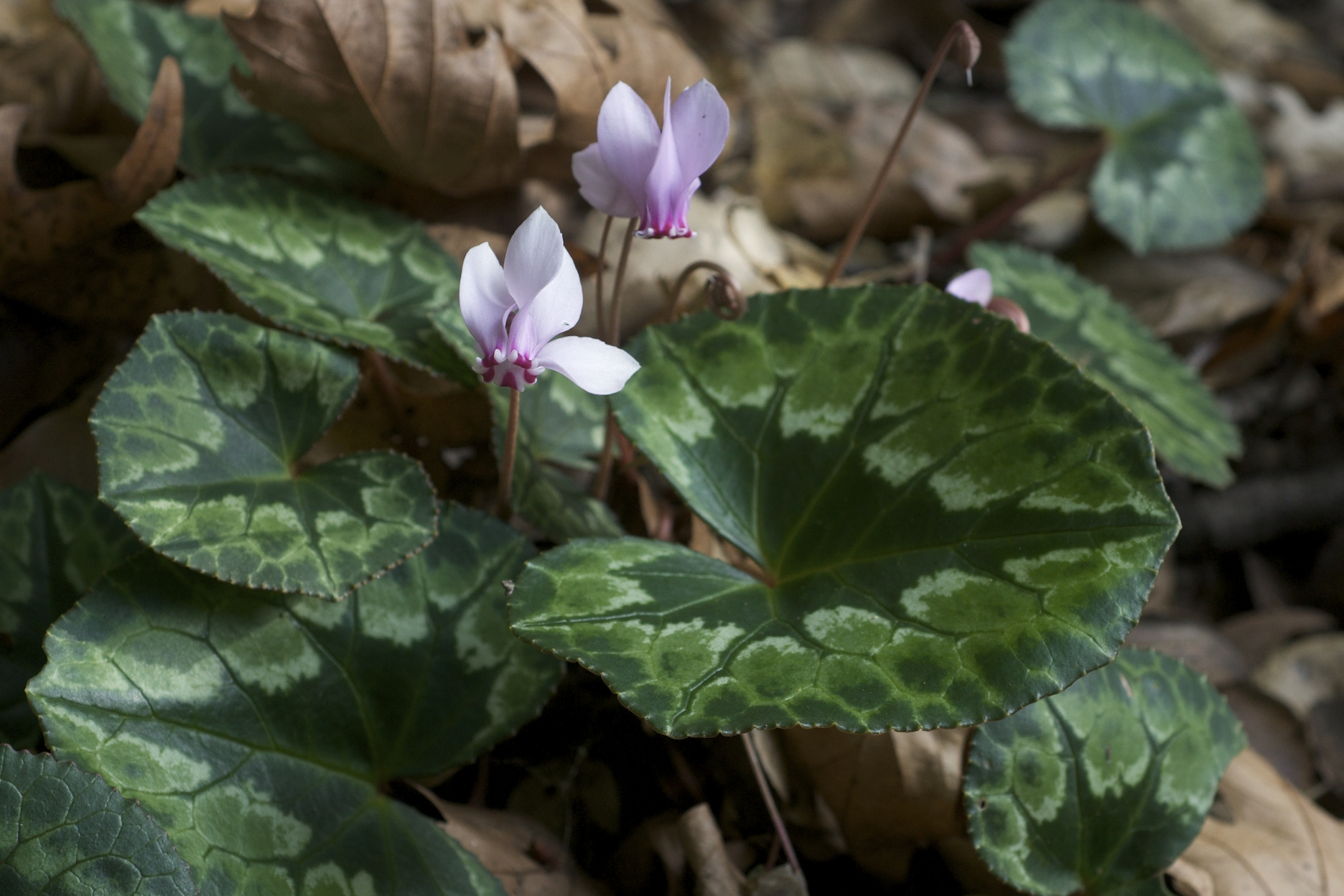

Scientific classification
- Kingdom: Plantae
- Clade: Tracheophytes
- Clade: Angiosperms
- Clade: Eudicots
- Clade: Asterids
- Order: Ericales
- Family: Primulaceae
- Genus: Cyclamen
- Subgenus: C. subg. Cyclamen
- Species: C. africanum

Binomial name
- Cyclamen africanum Boiss. & Reut.

Synonyms
- Cyclamen algeriense Jord. Cyclamen ambiguum O.Schwarz; Cyclamen commutatum O.Schwarz & Lepper; Cyclamen hederifolium subsp. africanum (Boiss. & Reut.) Ietsw. Cyclamen numidicum Glasau; Cyclamen pachybolbum Jord. Cyclamen saldense Pomel; Cyclamen subrotundum Jord. Cyclamen venustum Jord.

= Cyclamen africanum =

Species of flowering plant in the primrose family

Cyclamen africanum is a species of flowering plant in the family Primulaceae. It is referred to by the common name African cyclamen and is a perennial growing from a tuber, native to northern Algeria, Morocco and Tunisia. It is similar to Cyclamen hederifolium, but not frost-hardy.

== Description ==
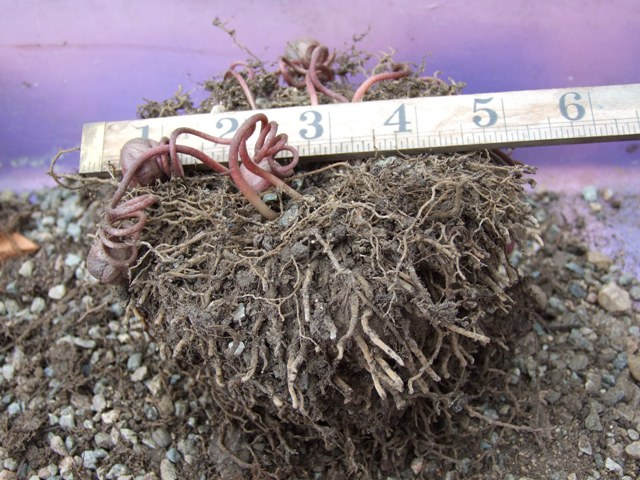
Tuber

The tuber produces roots from the top, sides, and bottom, unlike Cyclamen hederifolium, which produces roots from the top and sides, but not the bottom.

Both the leaves and flowers are similar to Cyclamen hederifolium, but are larger on average.

Leaf and flower stalks extend straight up from the tuber; in Cyclamen hederifolium the leaf stalks extend outwards before bending up, forming an "elbow".

Cyclamen africanum crosses easily with Cyclamen hederifolium. Plants sold by nurseries are often hybrids between the two species (Cyclamen ×hildebrandii O. Schwarz). This robust hybrid is more hardy than Cyclamen africanum and can be planted outside in a sheltered place.
