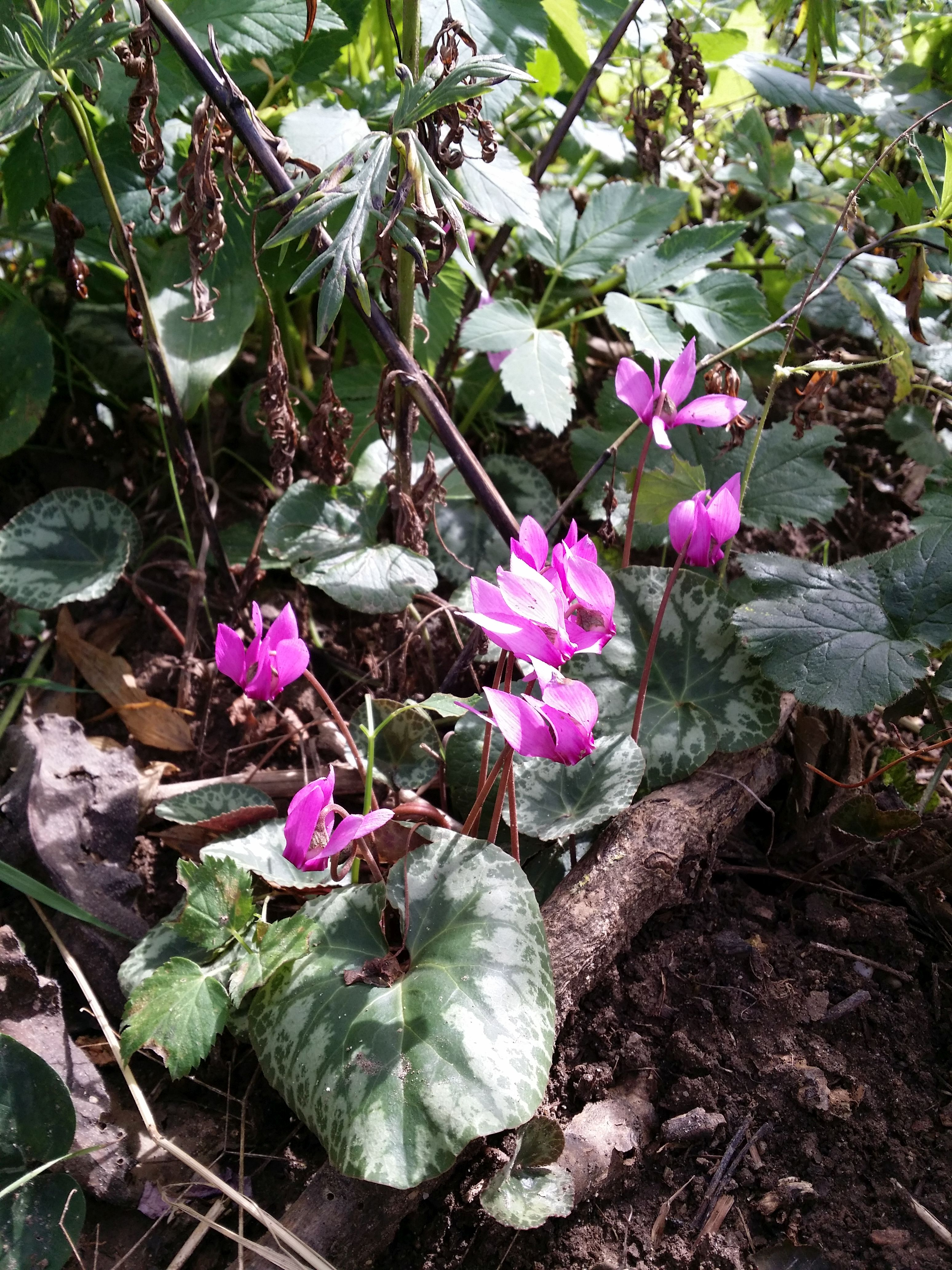
- Cyclamen purpurascens growing wild in Glasweiner Wald, Weyerburg, Hollabrunn District, Lower Austria

Scientific classification
- Kingdom: Plantae
- Clade: Embryophytes
- Clade: Tracheophytes
- Clade: Angiosperms
- Clade: Eudicots
- Clade: Asterids
- Order: Ericales
- Family: Primulaceae
- Subfamily: Myrsinoideae
- Genus: Cyclamen; L.

Species
- See text.

Synonyms
- Cyclaminos Heldr.; Cyclaminum Bubani; Cyclaminus Haller

= Cyclamen =

Genus of flowering plants in the primrose family

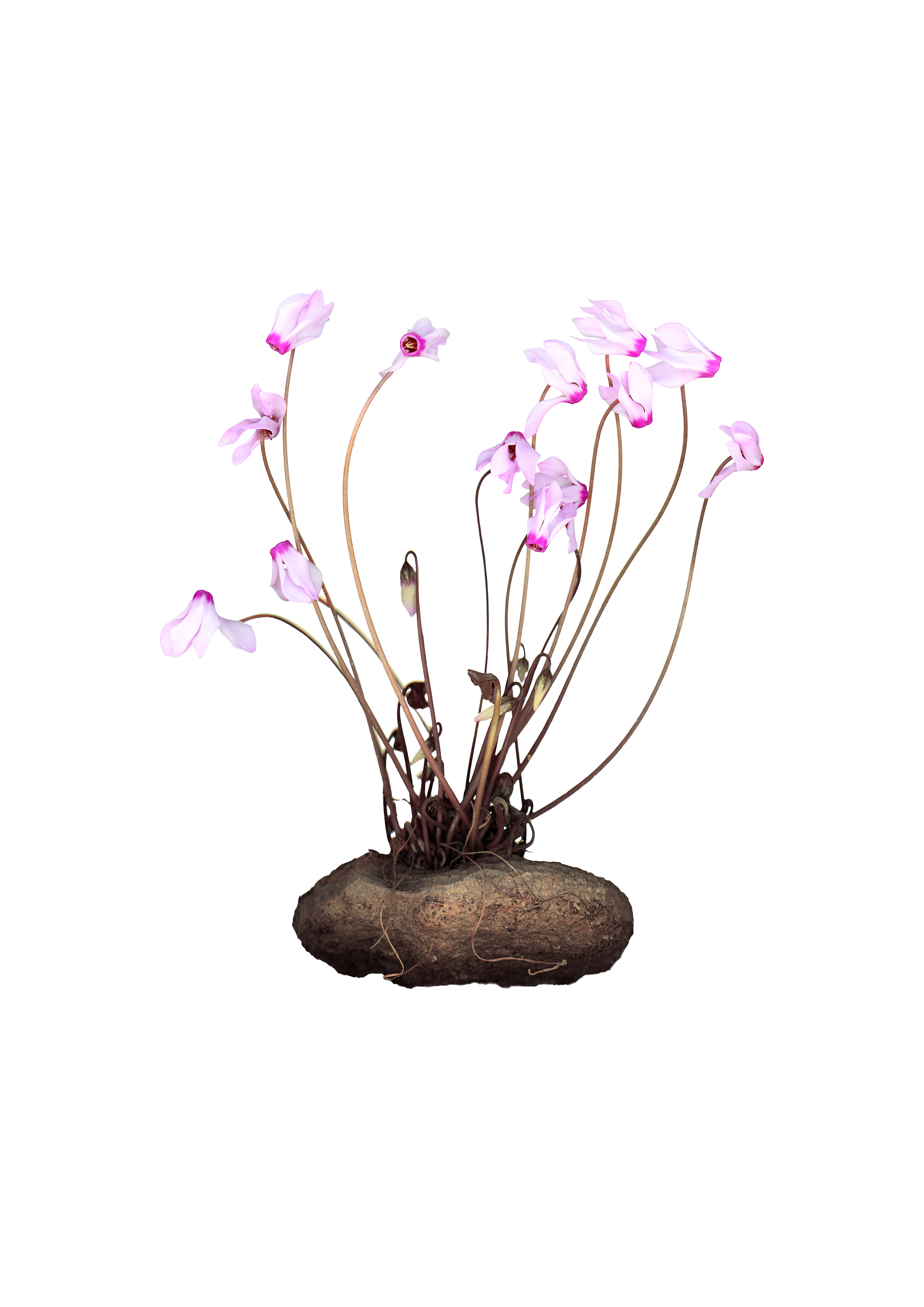

Cyclamen is a genus of 25 species of perennial flowering plants in the family Primulaceae. In English, it is known by the common name sowbread, or (particularly in horticulture), by the genus name as cyclamen. The species are native to Europe and the Mediterranean Basin east to the Caucasus and Iran, with one species in Somalia. They grow from tubers and are valued for their flowers with upswept petals and variably patterned leaves.

== Names ==
Cyclamen is Medieval Latin, from earlier Latin cyclamīnos, from Ancient Greek κυκλάμινος, kyklā́mīnos (also kyklāmī́s), from κύκλος, kýklos "circle", from the coiled fruit stalks after flowering, or from the round tuber.

In many languages Cyclamen species are colloquially called by a name like the English sowbread, because they are said to be eaten by pigs, based on Medieval Latin panis porcinus; Saubrot in German, pain de pourceau in French, pan porcino in Italian and varkensbrood in Dutch.

== Description ==
Cyclamen have a tuber, from which the leaves, flowers and roots grow. In most species leaves come up in autumn, grow through the winter and then die in spring, then the plant aestivates, going dormant through the dry Mediterranean summer.

=== Tuber ===
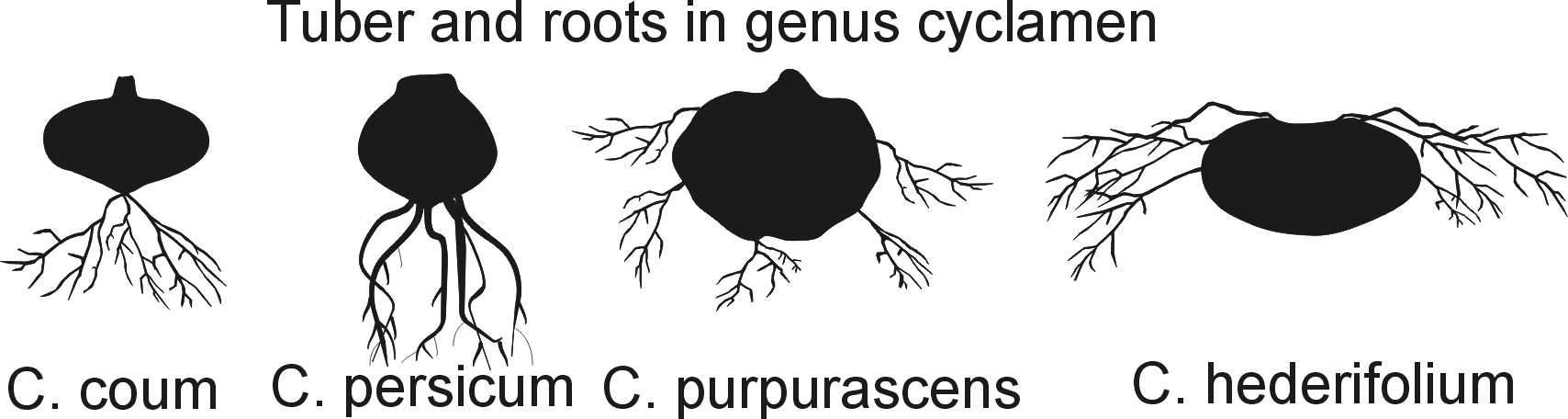
Tuber and roots

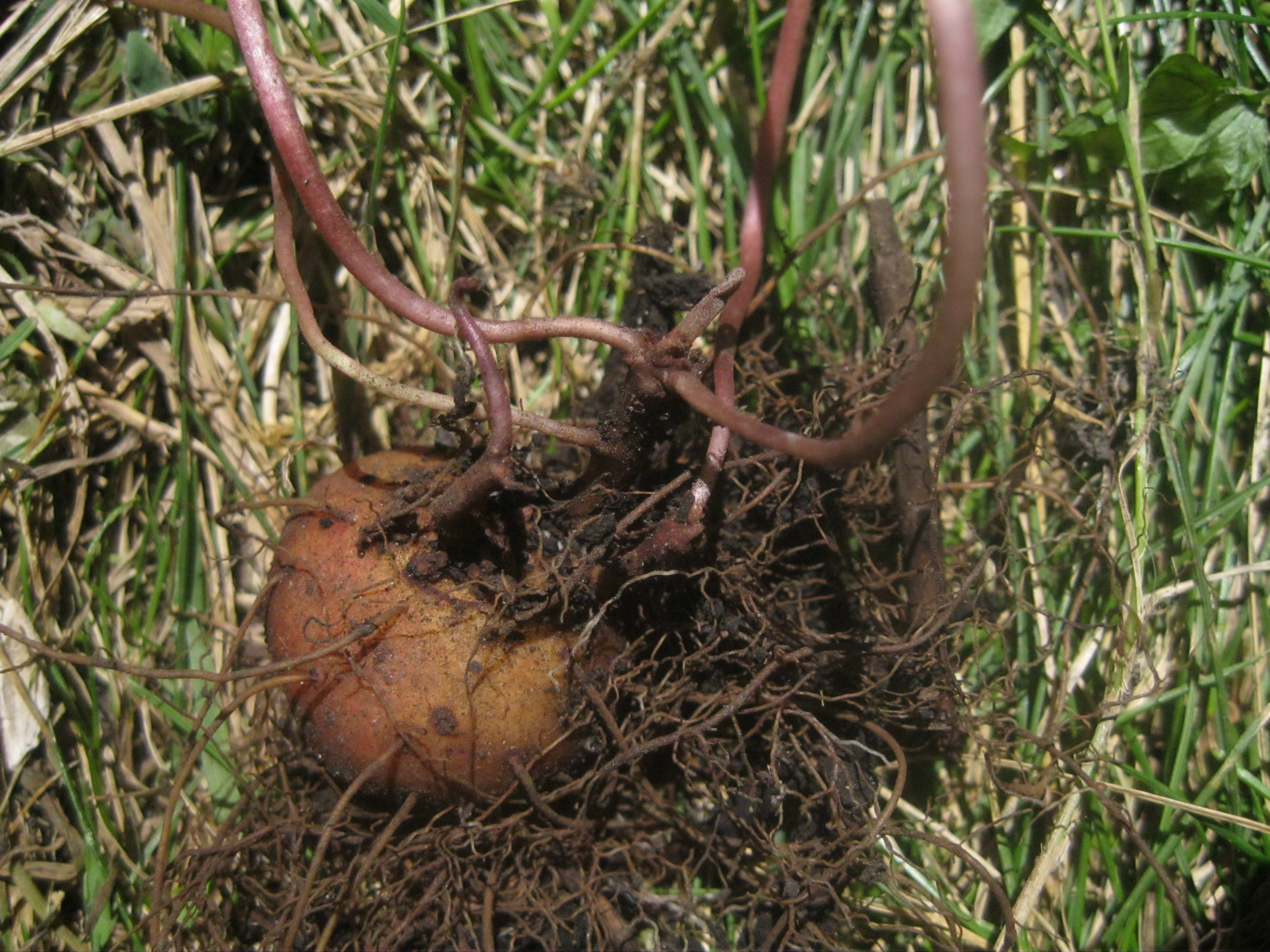
A tuber of Cyclamen purpurascens with three floral trunks

The storage organ of the Cyclamen is a round tuber, which develops from the hypocotyl (the stem of a seedling). It is often mistakenly called a corm, but a corm (found in crocuses, for example) has a papery tunic and a basal plate from which the roots grow. The storage organ of the Cyclamen has no papery covering and, depending on the species, roots may grow out of any part. It is therefore properly classified as a tuber (somewhat like a potato). The tuber may produce roots from the top, sides or bottom, depending on the species. Cyclamen persicum and Cyclamen coum root from the bottom; Cyclamen hederifolium roots from the top and sides. Cyclamen graecum has thick anchor roots on the bottom. The roots and tubers of Cyclamen plants are known to contain the compound cyclamin.

The shape of the tuber may be near spherical, as in Cyclamen coum, or flattened, as in Cyclamen hederifolium. In some older specimens of Cyclamen purpurascens and Cyclamen rohlfsianum growing points on the tuber become separated by shoulders of tissue and the tuber becomes misshapen. In most other species the tuber is round in old age.

Leaves and flowers sprout from growing points on the top of the tuber. Growing points that have lengthened and become like woody stems are known as floral trunks.

The size of the tuber varies depending on species. In Cyclamen hederifolium older tubers commonly reach 24 cm (9 1/2 in) across, but in Cyclamen parviflorum tubers do not grow larger than 2 cm (3/4 in) across.

=== Leaves ===
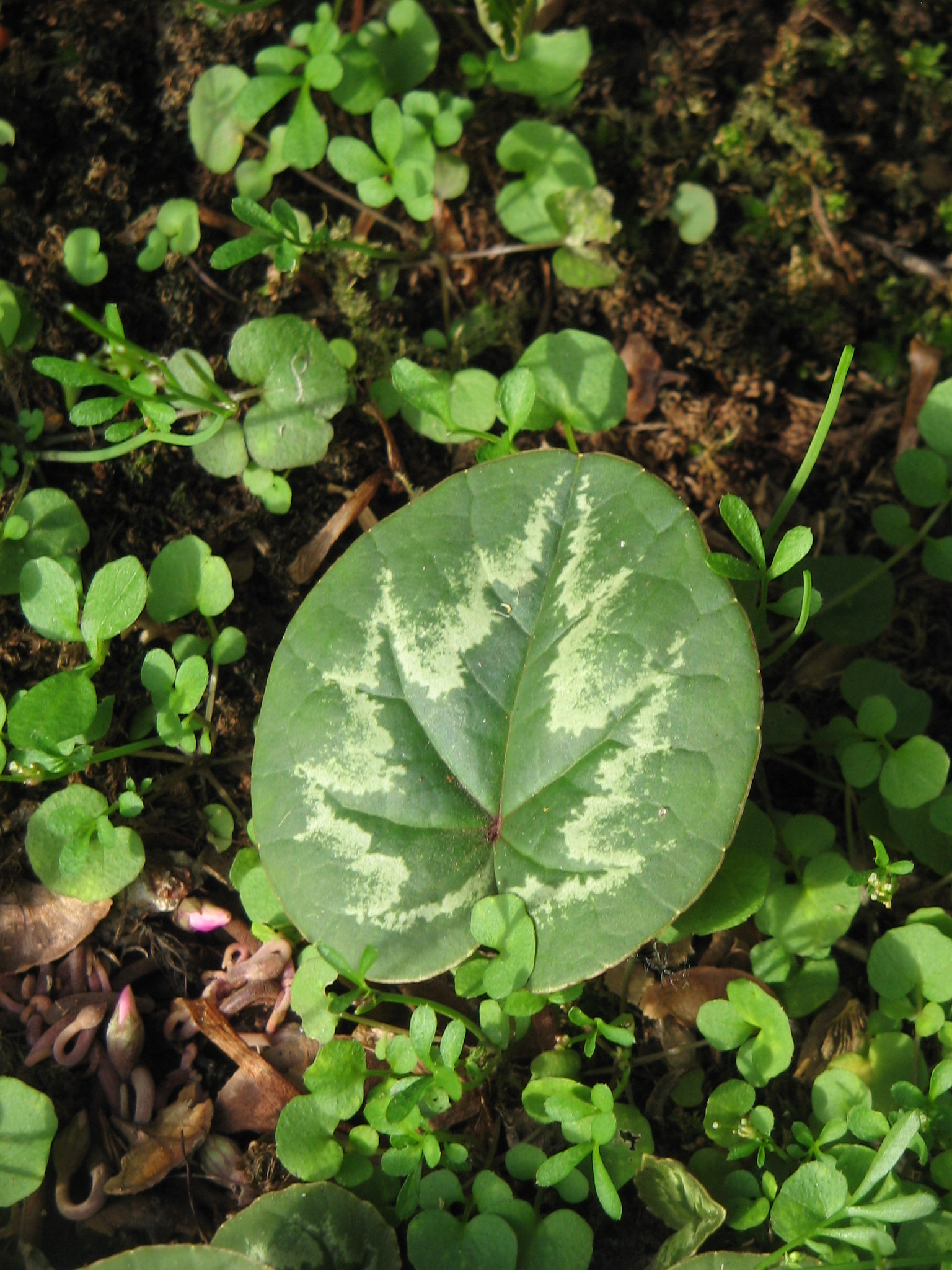
Christmas tree pattern on leaf

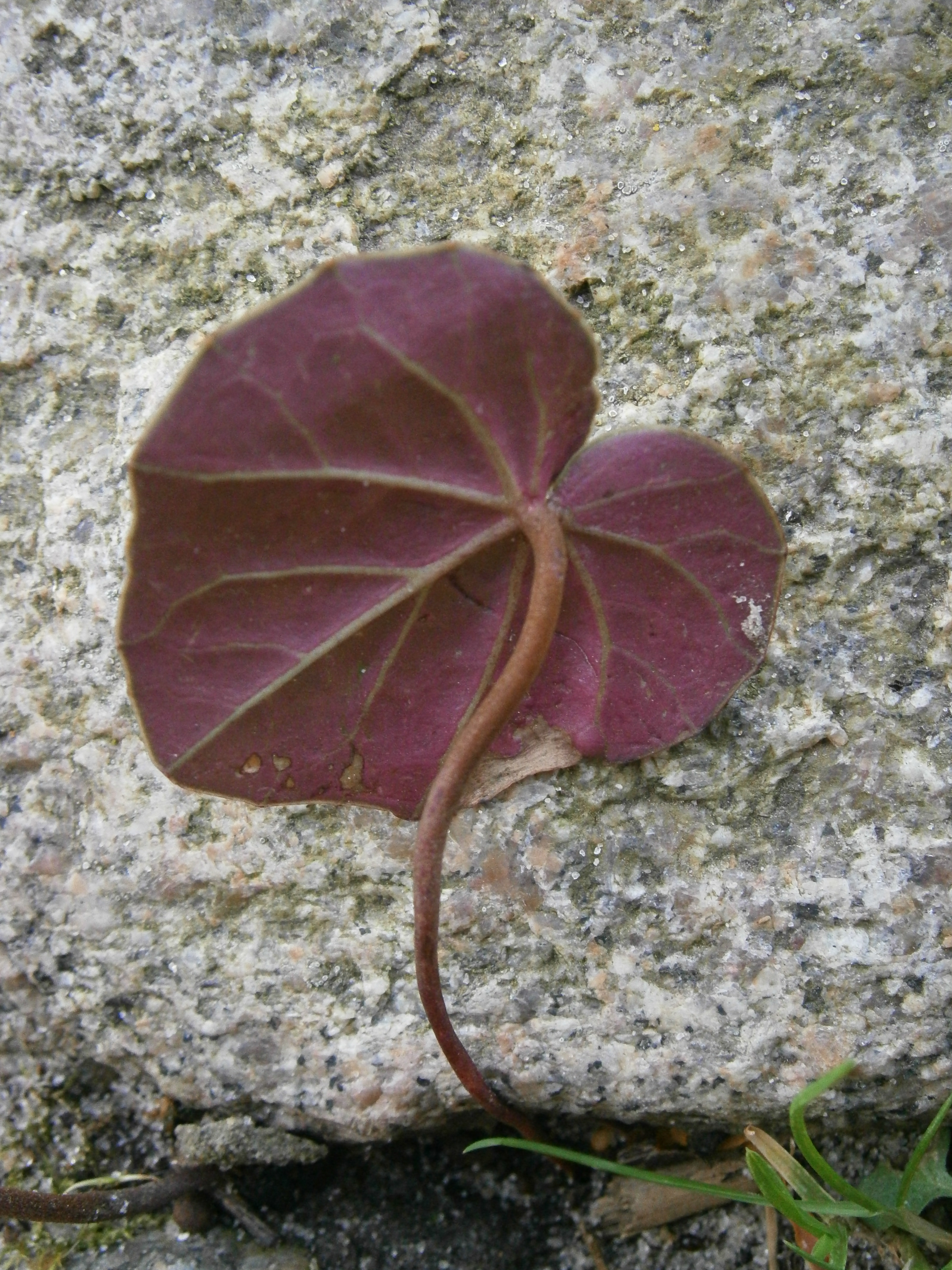
Lower side of a leaf

Cyclamen coum

Leaves sprout from growing points or floral trunks on top of the tuber. Each leaf grows on its own stem. Leaf stems in early growth may be distinguished from flower stems by the direction their tips curl: tips of leaf stems curl upwards and those of flower stems curl downwards.

The shape of the leaves varies among the species and even among different specimens of the same species. Cyclamen hederifolium and Cyclamen repandum usually have leaves shaped like ivy, with angles and lobes, Cyclamen coum has nearly round leaves and Cyclamen persicum has heart-shaped leaves with a pointed tip. The leaf margin may be smooth, as in Cyclamen coum subsp. coum, or finely toothed, as in Cyclamen graecum.

The colour of the upper side of leaves is variable, even within a species. Most species have leaves variegated in several shades of green and silver, either in an irregular pattern of blotches or an arrowhead or Christmas-tree shape. In cultivation Cyclamen, especially species other than Cyclamen persicum, are selected as often for striking or unusual leaf patterns as for their flowers.

The lower side of leaves is often shiny and vary from plain green to rich red or purple.

Most Cyclamen species originate from the Mediterranean, where summers are hot and dry and winters are cool and wet, and are summer-dormant; their leaves sprout in the autumn, remain through the winter and wither the next spring. Cyclamen purpurascens and Cyclamen colchicum, however, originate from cooler regions in mountains and their leaves remain through the summer and wither only after the next year's leaves have developed.

=== Flowers ===
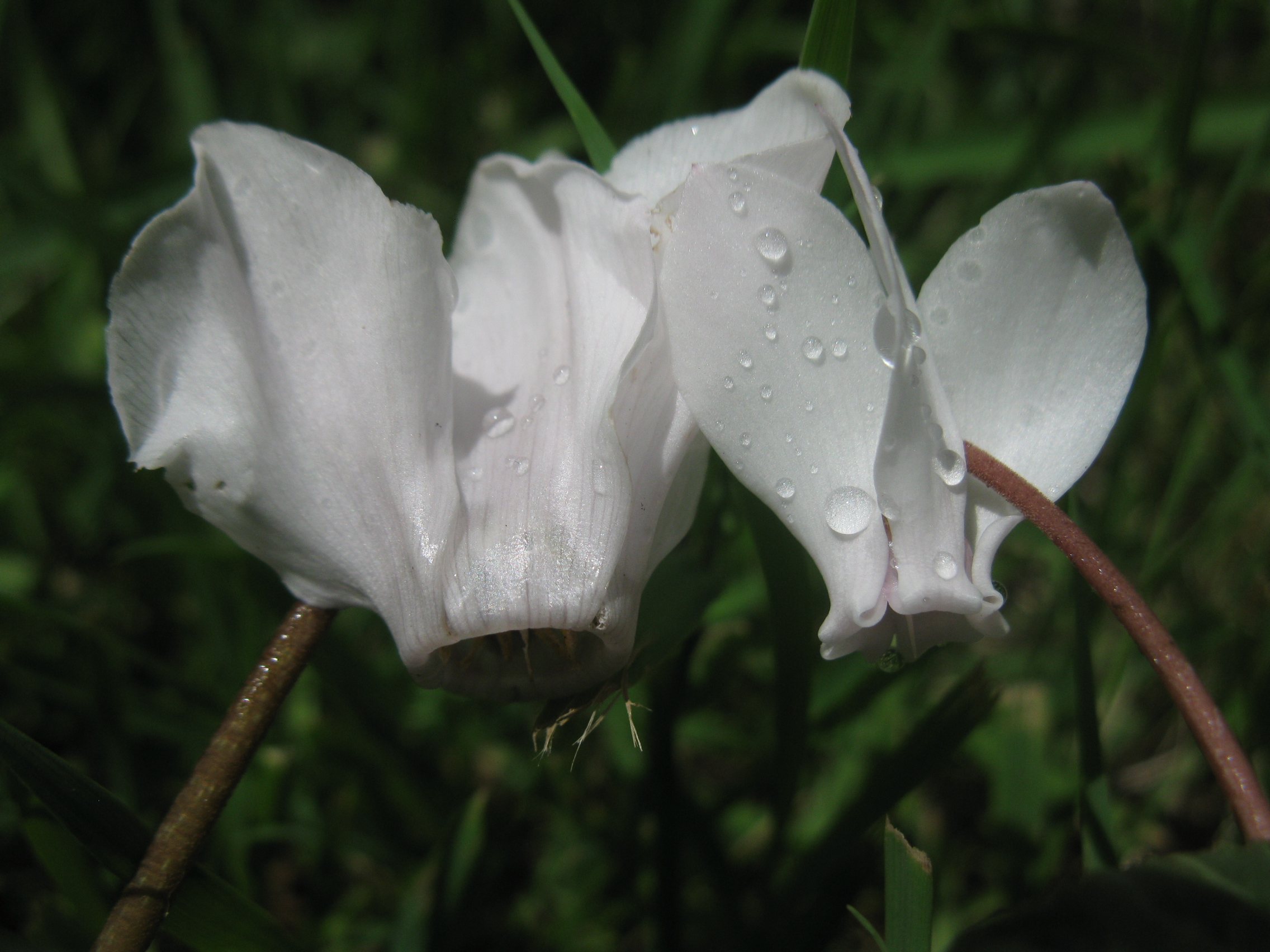
On left C. persicum (without auricles); on right C. hederifolium (with auricles)

Flowering time may be any month of the year, depending on the species. Cyclamen hederifolium and Cyclamen purpurascens bloom in summer and autumn, Cyclamen persicum and Cyclamen coum bloom in winter and Cyclamen repandum blooms in spring.

Each flower is on a stem coming from a growing point on the tuber. In all species the stem is normally bent 150–180° at the tip so that the corolla of the flower faces downwards. Cyclamen hederifolium 'Stargazer' is an exception; its corolla faces upwards. Flowers have 5 petals, bent outwards or up, sometimes twisted, and connected at the base into a cup, and five sepals behind the cup.

Petal shape varies depending on species and sometimes within the same species. Cyclamen repandum has petals much longer than wide, Cyclamen coum has stubby, almost round petals, and Cyclamen hederifolium usually has petals with proportions between the two.

The petals may be white, pink or purple, often with darker colour at the centre. Many species have a pink form and a white form but a few have only one colour, such as Cyclamen balearicum, which is always white.

The dark colour on the flower centre varies in shape; Cyclamen persicum has a smooth band, Cyclamen hederifolium has a streaky 'V', and Cyclamen coum has an 'M'-shaped splotch with two white or pink 'eyes' beneath.

In some species, such as Cyclamen hederifolium, the petal edges at the nose are curved outwards into auricles (Latin for 'little ears'). Most species, such as Cyclamen persicum, have no auricles.

In most species the style protrudes 1–3 mm out of the centre of the flower, but the stamens are inside the flower. In Cyclamen rohlfsianum, however, the cone of anthers sticks out prominently, about 2–3 mm (0.08–0.12 in) beyond the rim of the corolla, similar to shooting-stars (Primula sect. Dodecatheon).

=== Fruit ===
The flower stem coils or bends when the fruit begins to form. The stems of Cyclamen hederifolium and Cyclamen coum coil starting at the end, Cyclamen persicum arches downwards but does not curl, Cyclamen rohlfsianum coils start near the tuber and Cyclamen graecum coils in both directions, starting in the middle.

The fruit is a round pod, which opens by several flaps or teeth at maturity and contains numerous sticky seeds, brown at maturity. Natural seed dispersal is by ants (myrmecochory), which eat the sticky covering and then discard the seeds.

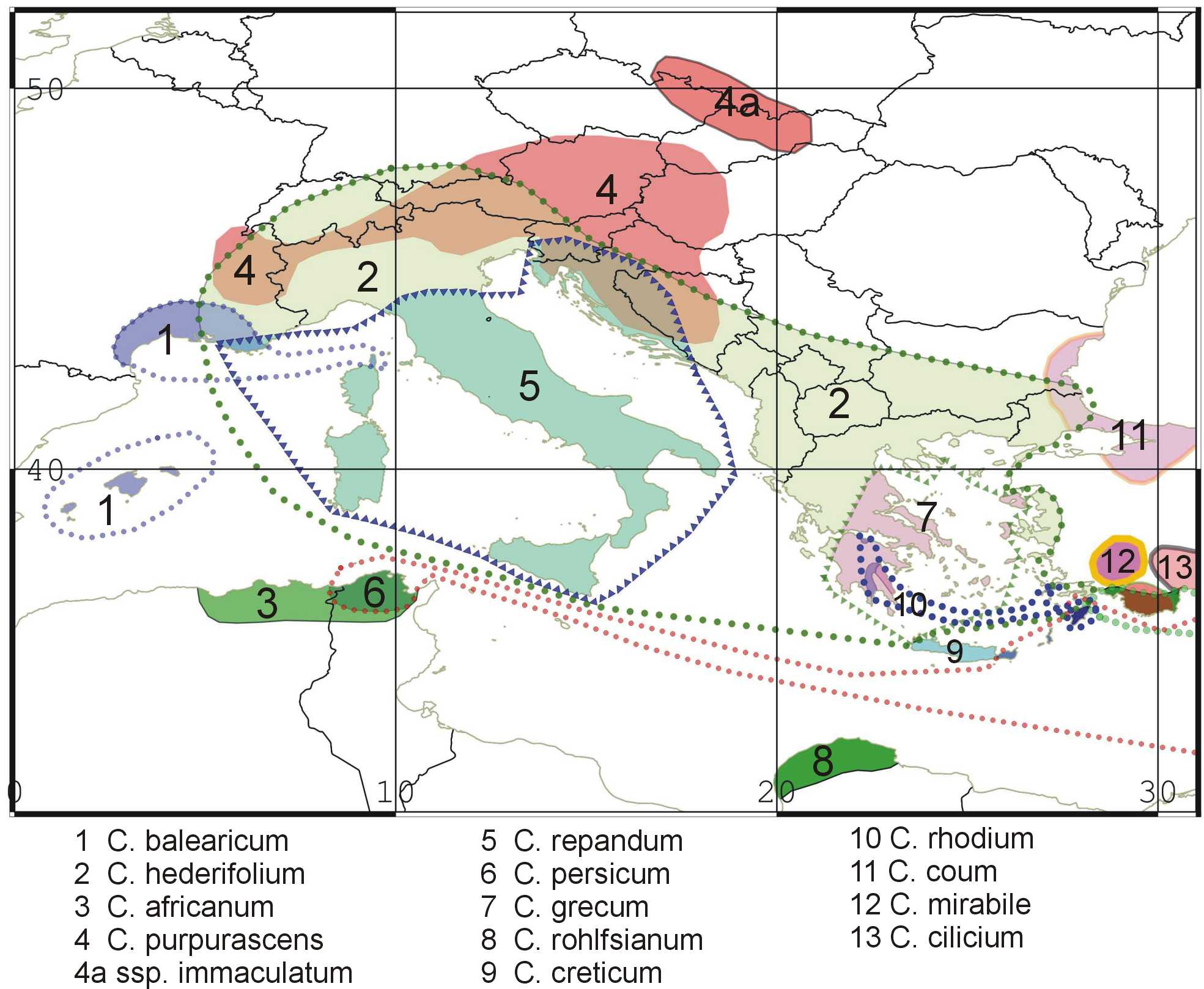
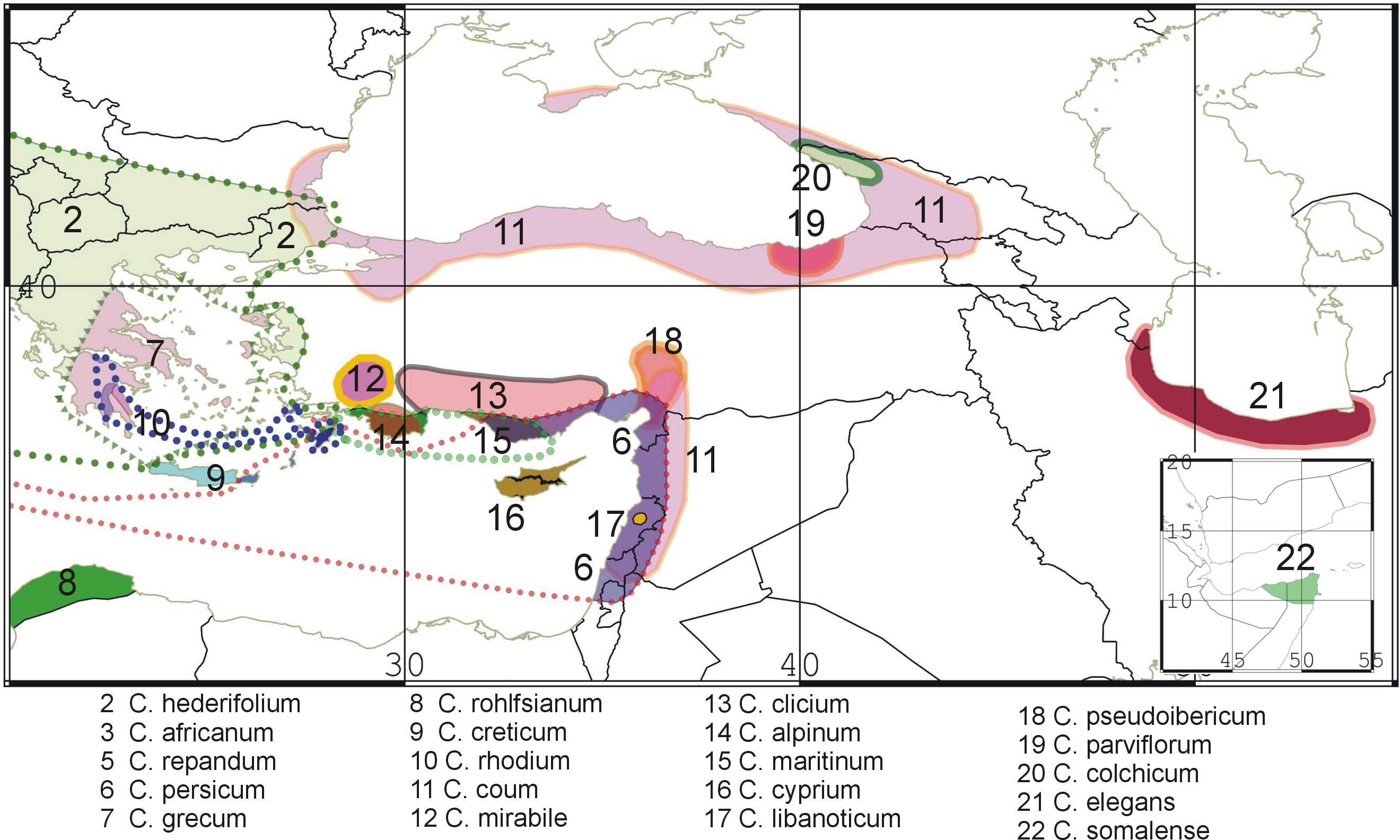
Distribution map of the species of the genus cylamen in Europe, Asia and Africa. (Presumed spread according to wikipedia sources and informations from "cyclamen.org"))

== Taxonomy ==
The genus Cyclamen was first described by Carl Linnaeus in Species Plantarum in 1753. It was traditionally classified in the family Primulaceae, was reclassified in the family Myrsinaceae in 2000 and finally, in 2009 with the introduction of the APG III system, was returned to the family Primulaceae, in the subfamily Myrsinoideae.

The lectotype species is Cyclamen europaeum L., a synonym of Cyclamen purpurascens Mill.; it was designated by Hitchcock & Green, in the International Botanical Congress. Cambridge (England), 1930. Nomenclature. Proposals by British Botanists: 129 (Aug. 1929).

=== Phylogeny ===
A phylogeny of Cyclamen published in 2000, with four supported clades approximately corresponding to four subgenera, is shown below. The phylogeny is based on morphology, cytology and DNA-sequences. A few species that were not included in the analysis are placed based on morphology only and are noted with a question mark.

- genus Cyclamen
  - subg. Cyclamen
    - Cyclamen purpurascens
    - - Cyclamen africanum
      - Cyclamen hederifolium
  - subg. Psilanthum
    - Cyclamen balearicum
    - Cyclamen creticum
  - subg. Eucosme
    - Cyclamen graecum
    - Cyclamen rohlfsianum
    - - Cyclamen persicum
      - Cyclamen somalense
  - subg. Gyrophoebe
    - - Cyclamen pseudibericum
      - - Cyclamen cyprium
        - Cyclamen libanoticum
    - - Cyclamen coum
      - Cyclamen mirabile
      - - Cyclamen intaminatum
        - Cyclamen cilicium?
      - Cyclamen parviflorum?
      - Cyclamen alpinum?

A study published in 2004 produced a similar phylogeny in a combined analysis of molecular and morphological data:

- - Clade A
    - C. creticum
    - - C. repandum
      - C. balearicum
  - - - Clade B
        - - C. hederifolium
          - C. africanum
        - - C. purpurascens
          - C. colchicum
      - Clade C
        - C. rohlfsianum
        - - C. graecum
          - - C. persicum
            - C. somalense
    - Clade D
      - - C. parviflorum
        - - C. pseudibericum
          - - C. libanoticum
            - C. cyprium
      - - - C. cilicium
          - - C. mirabile
            - C. intaminatum
        - - C. alpinum
          - - C. coum
            - C. elegans

A comparison of the groups produced in the two studies shows them to be very similar (see the table below). Nevertheless, the authors of the 2004 study declined to produce a subgeneric classification, concluding that more work was needed to align the phylogeny and classification of Cyclamen, stating that "the publication of formal classifications before adequate data can provide a clear and consistent pattern of information, leads to nomenclatural instability".

Comparison of groups within Cyclamen
Anderberg et al. (2000)	Compton et al. (2004)
Subgenus Psilanthum: C. balearicum; C. creticum	Clade A: C. balearicum; C. creticum; C. repandum
Subgenus Cyclamen: C. africanum; C. hederifolium; C. purpurascens	Clade B: C. africanum; C. colchicum; C. hederifolium; C. purpurascens
Subgenus Eucosme: C. graecum; C. persicum; C. rohlfsianum; C. somalense	Clade C: C. graecum; C. persicum; C. rohlfsianum; C. somalense
Subgenus Gyrophoebe: C. alpinum; C. cilicium?; C. coum; C. cyprium; C. intaminatum; C. libanoticum; C. mirabile; C. parviflorum?; C. pseudibericum	Clade D: C. alpinum; C. cilicium; C. coum; C. cyprium; C. elegans; C. intaminatum; C. libanoticum; C. mirabile; C. parviflorum; C. pseudibericum

=== Species ===
As of July 2026, Plants of the World Online accepted the following 25 species:

- Cyclamen africanum Boiss. & Reut.
- Cyclamen alpinum Dammann ex Sprenger
- Cyclamen balearicum Willk.
- Cyclamen brulloi Cambria, Giusso, Miniss., Tavilla & Salmeri
- Cyclamen cilicium Boiss. & Heldr.
- Cyclamen colchicum (Albov) Correvon
- Cyclamen confusum (Grey-Wilson) Culham, Jope & P.Moore
- Cyclamen coum Mill. — eastern sowbread
- Cyclamen creticum (Dörfl.) Hildebr.
- Cyclamen cyprium Kotschy
- Cyclamen elegans Boiss. & Buhse
- Cyclamen graecum Link
- Cyclamen hederifolium Aiton — sowbread
- Cyclamen intaminatum (Meikle) Grey-Wilson
- Cyclamen libanoticum Hildebr.
- Cyclamen maritimum Hildebr.
- Cyclamen mirabile Hildebr.
- Cyclamen parviflorum Pobed.
- Cyclamen persicum Mill.
- Cyclamen pseudibericum Hildebr.
- Cyclamen purpurascens Mill.
- Cyclamen repandum Sm. — spring sowbread
- Cyclamen rhodium R.Gorer ex O.Schwarz & Lepper
- Cyclamen rohlfsianum Asch.
- Cyclamen somalense Thulin & Warfa

== Ecology ==
Cyclamen species are eaten by the caterpillars of the gothic moth.

== Conservation ==
Cyclamen diversity in the Mediterranean has been studied extensively to understand how the species remain distinct (Debussche et al., 2000, 2002, 2003) and how they have reacted to the dramatic climate changes in the region. Certain climate-change models suggest many species could become extinct in their current range within the next 50 years.

In many areas within the native range Cyclamen populations have been severely depleted by collection from the wild, often illegally, for the horticultural trade; some species are now endangered as a result. However in a few areas plant-conservation charities have educated local people to control the harvest carefully at a sustainable level, including sowing seed for future crops, both sustaining the wild populations and producing a reliable long-term income. Many Cyclamen are also propagated in nurseries without harm to the wild plants.

== Culture ==
In the sixteenth century, women in their early stages of pregnancy avoided cyclamens in fear of a miscarriage because they were considered to strongly induce childbirth.

Cyclamens were used as love-charms, aphrodisiacs, and intoxicant and a small amount would be put in cakes or a cup of wine.

== Cultivation and uses ==
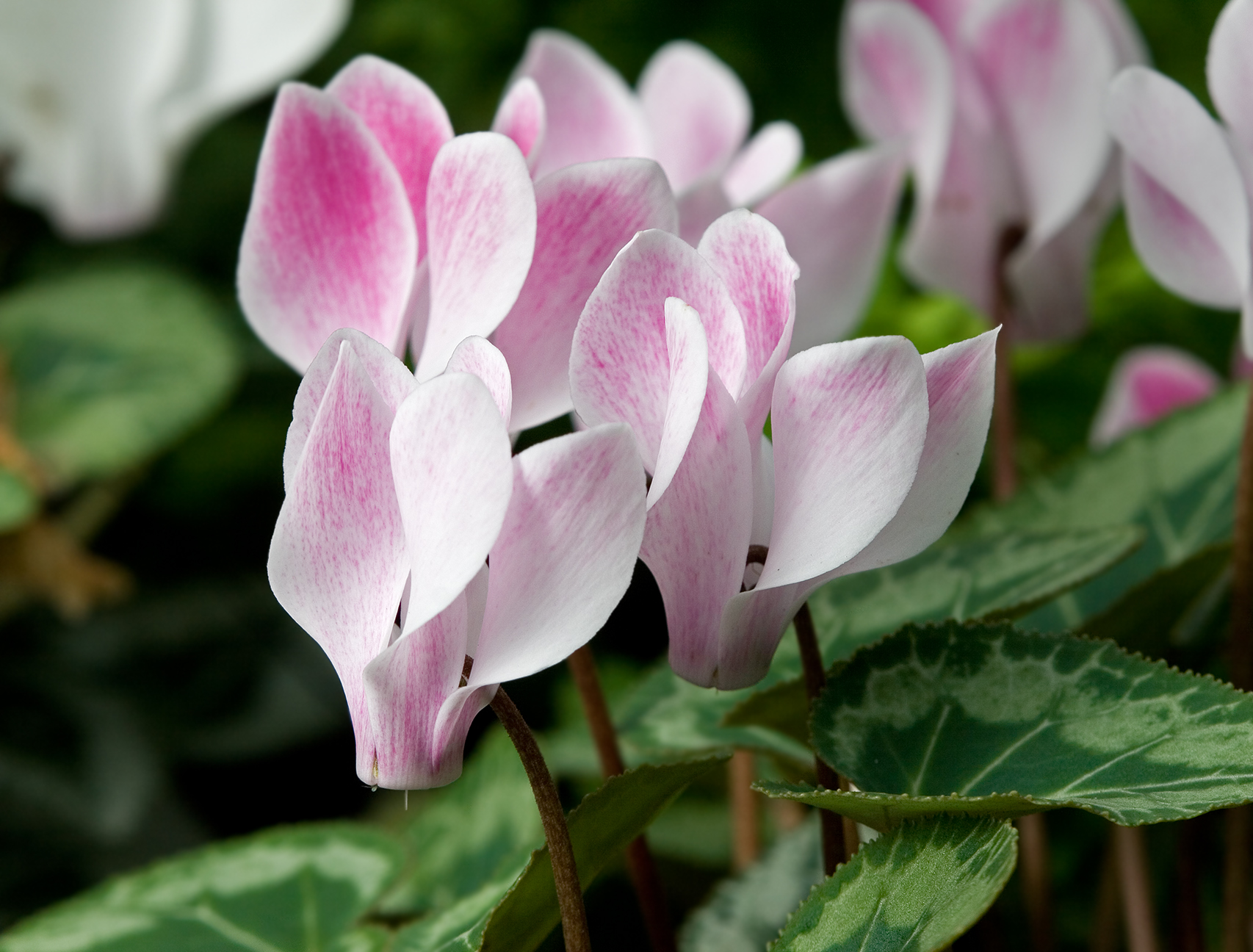
Cyclamen persicum 'Stirling', a cultivar

Cyclamen are commonly grown for their flowers, both outdoors and indoors in pots. Several species, particularly Cyclamen hederifolium, are hardy and can be grown outdoors in mild climates such as northwest Europe and the Pacific Northwest of North America. Three species, C. coum, C. hederifolium, and C. repandum, are widely naturalised in southern Britain, with C. hederifolium the most widspread and also naturalised in Ireland.

The Cyclamen Society is the International Cultivar Registration Authority for Cyclamen excluding C. persicum, and currently recognises over 100 registered cultivars.

Cyclamen flowers have a subtle scent that is reminiscent of both lily-of-the-valley and rose. The Cyclamen note is used in perfumery to give clean, watercolour-like scent. An example of a perfume with a leading Cyclamen note is Masaki Shiro by the Japanese brand Masaki Matsushima.

=== Hardiness ===
Cyclamen species range from frost-hardy to frost-tender.

The most frost-hardy species, such as C. coum, C. hederifolium, C. parviflorum, and C. purpurascens, tolerate temperatures down to −18 °C (0 °F), to even −30 °C (−22 °F) when growing in well-drained soil and protected by snow cover. C. repandum survives temperatures down to −14 °C (7 °F) but not prolonged freezing below this temperature. C. graecum tolerates frost as low as −4 °C (25 °F) for a few hours. Others, such as C. africanum, C. persicum and C. rohlfsianum, tolerate only mild and brief frost. Summer heat is not normally a problem for dorment aestivating plants, but shade is essential where temperatures regularly exceed 32 °C (90 °F).

=== Florists' cyclamens ===
The cyclamen most commonly sold by florists is Cyclamen persicum, which is frost-tender. Selected Cyclamen cultivars have white, bright pink, red or purple flowers. While flowering, florists' cyclamens should be kept below 20 °C (68 °F), with the night-time temperatures preferably 6.5–15 °C (43.7–59.0 °F). Temperatures above 21 °C (70 °F) may induce the plant to aestivate.

=== Gallery ===
Cyclamen bloom in different seasons, depending on the species.

Winter and spring

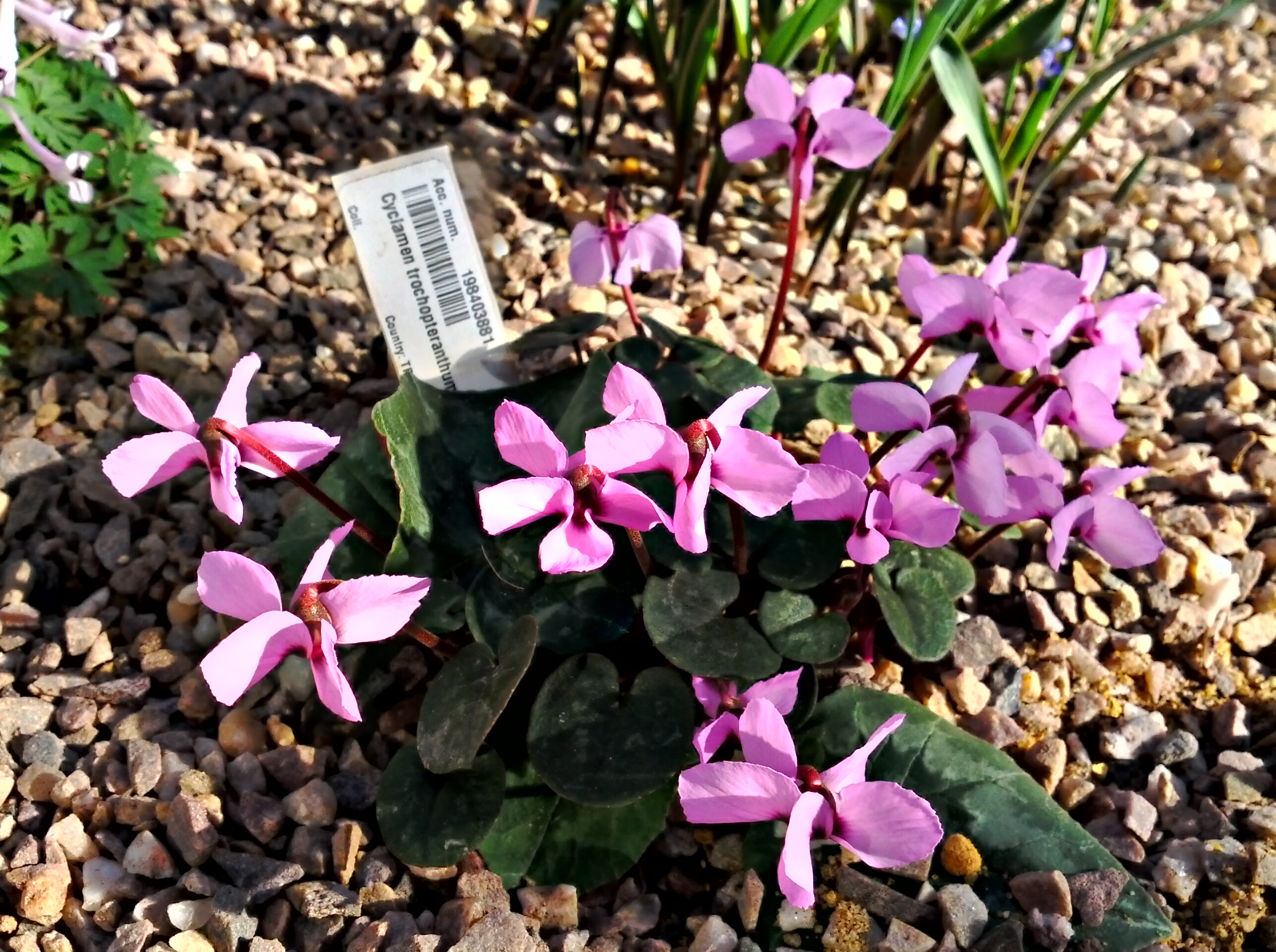
C. alpinum

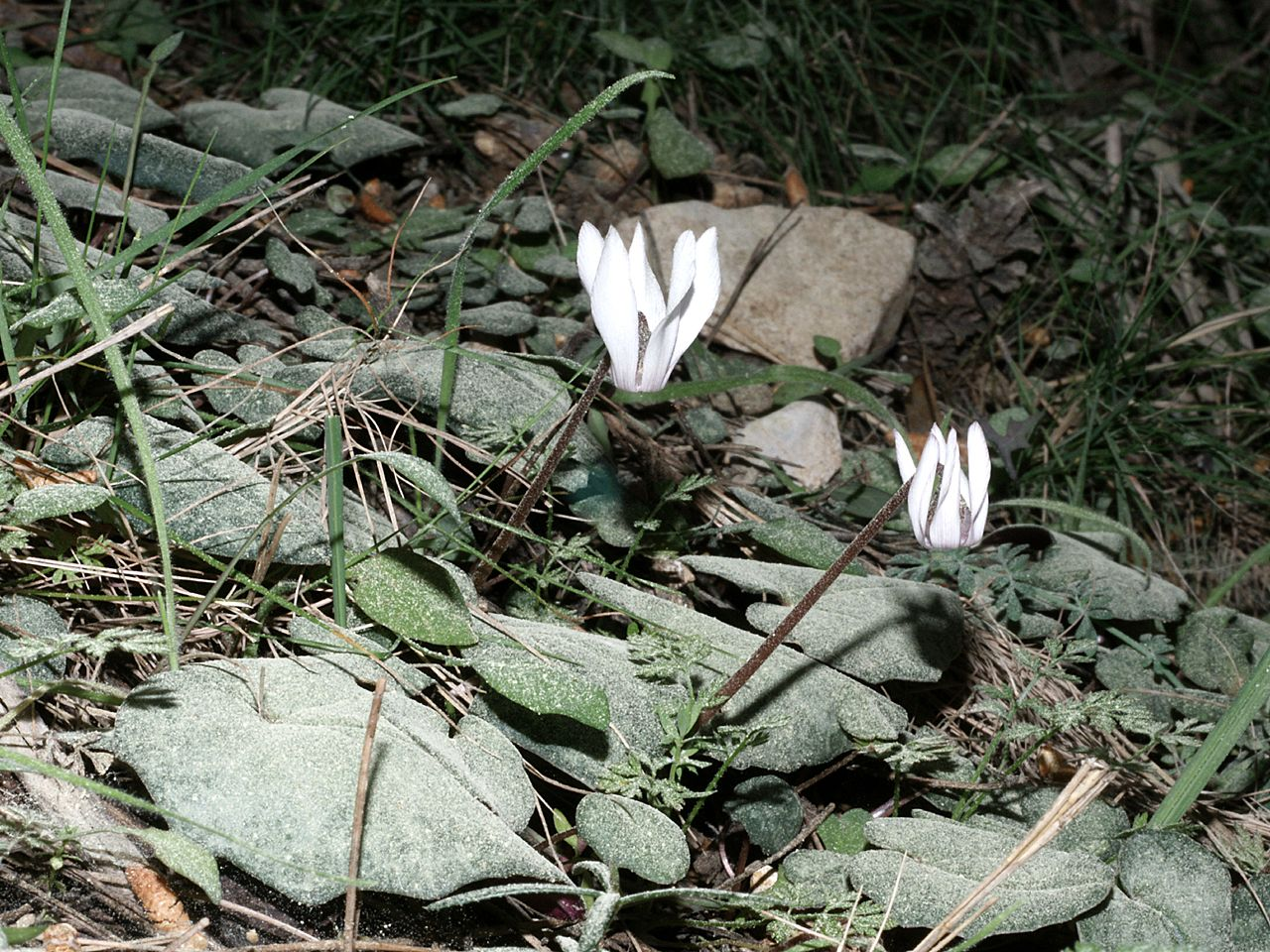
C. balearicum

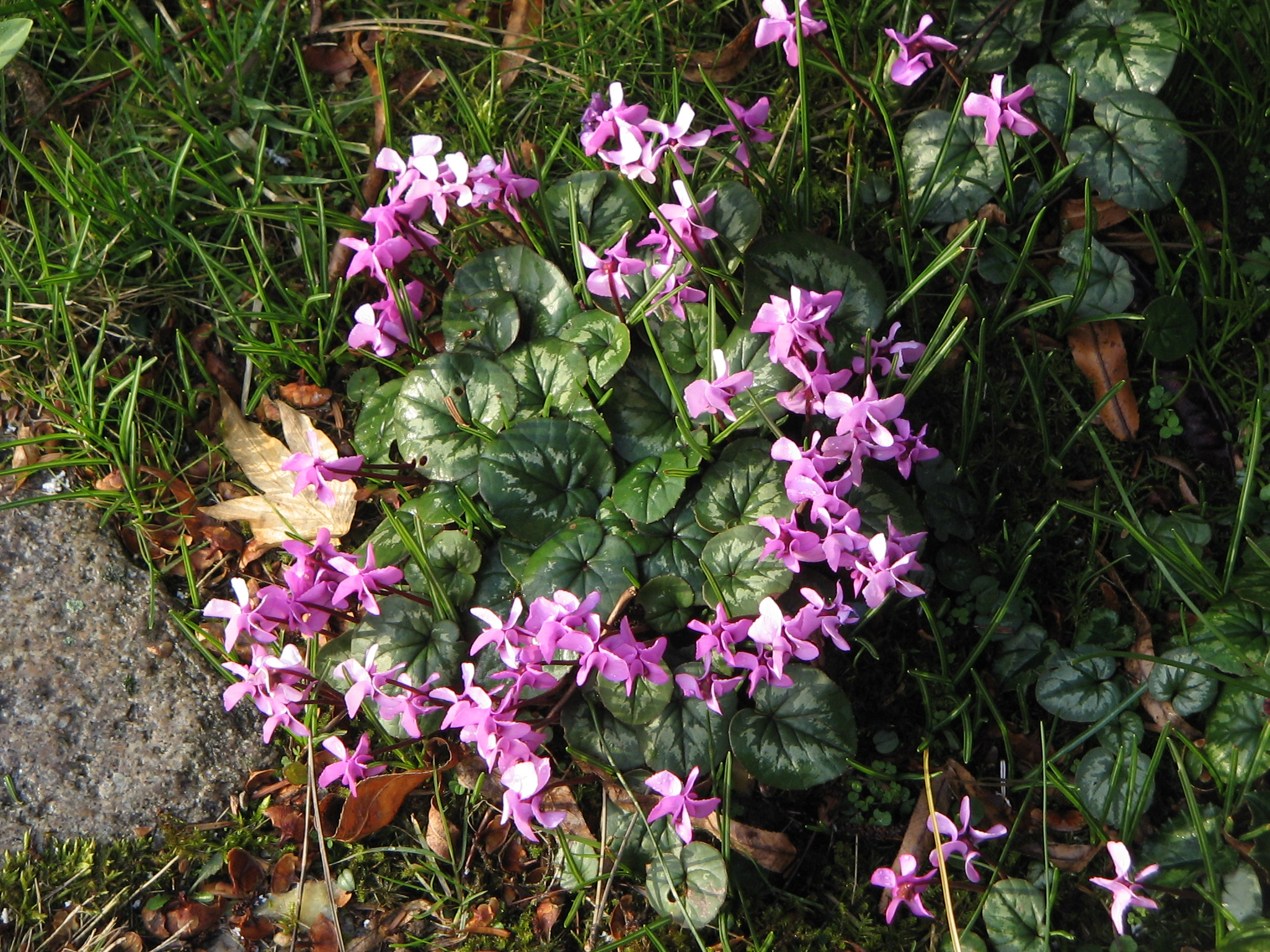
C. coum

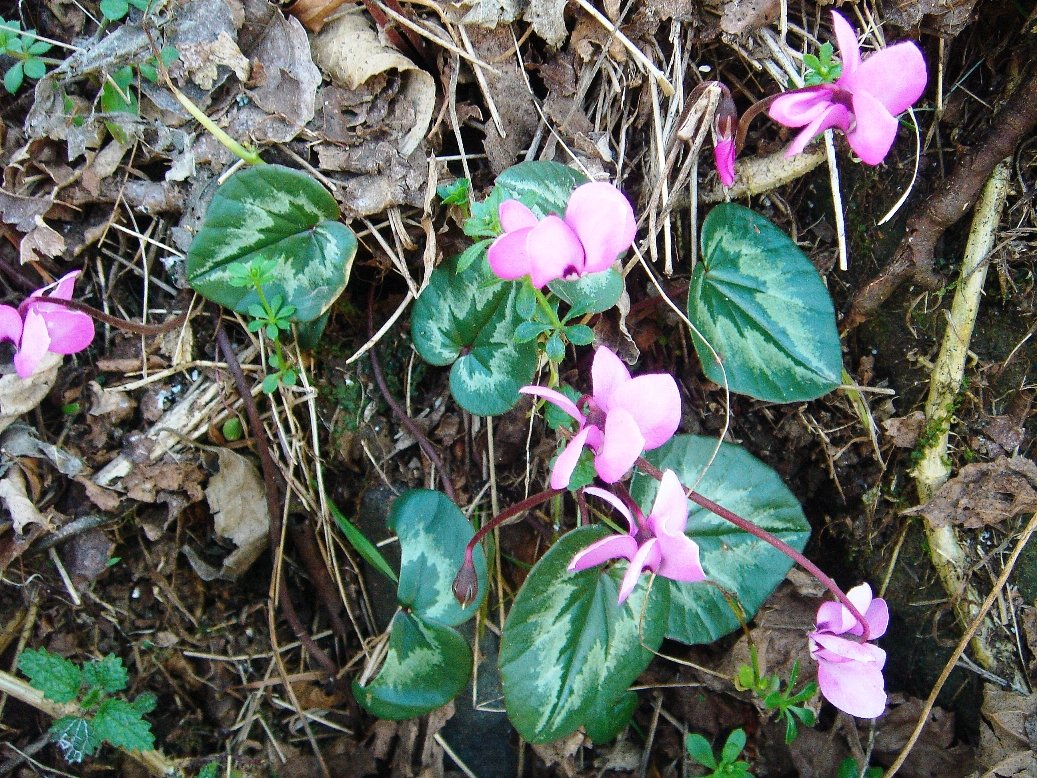
C. coum subsp. caucasicum

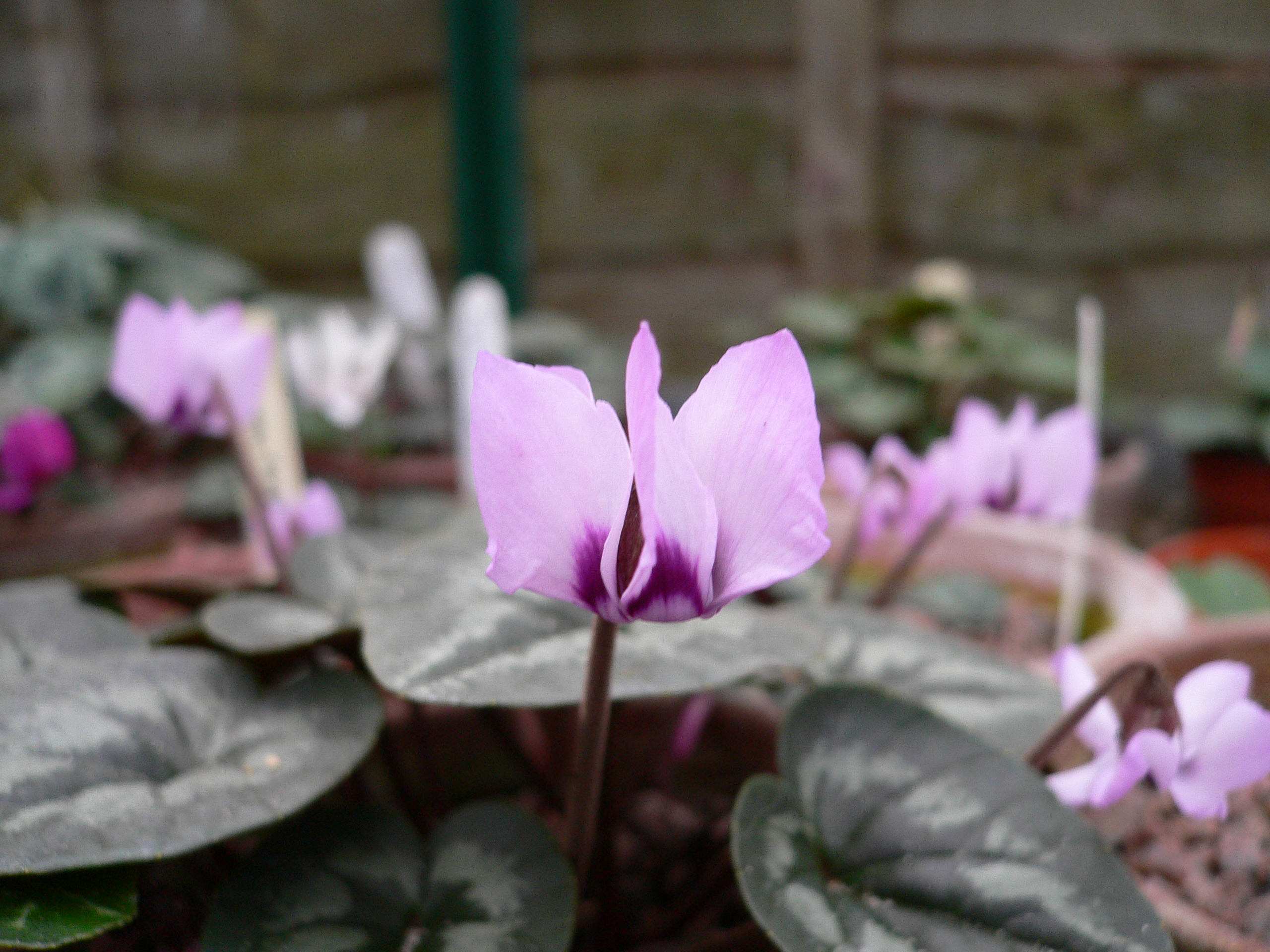
C. elegans

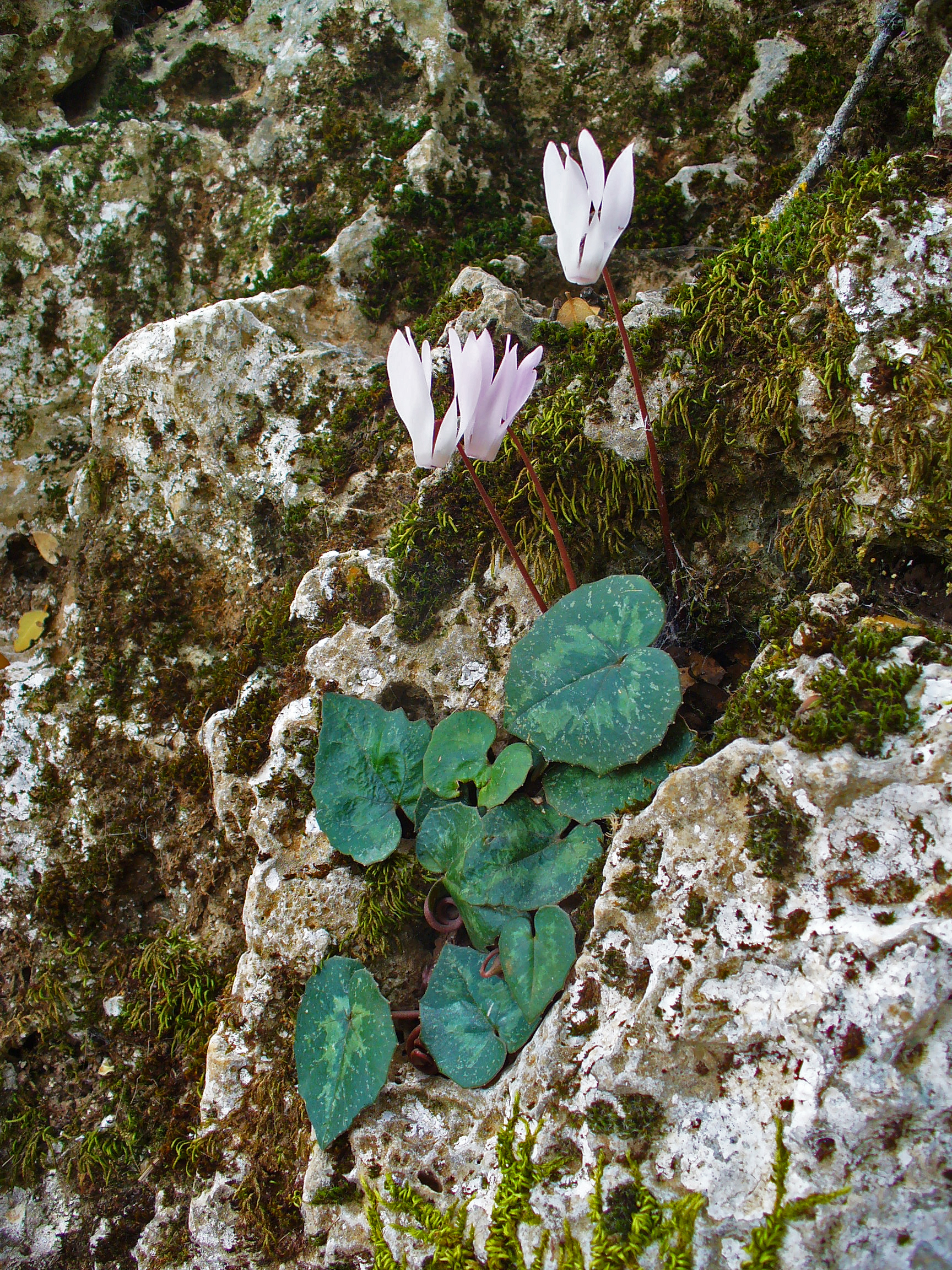
C. creticum

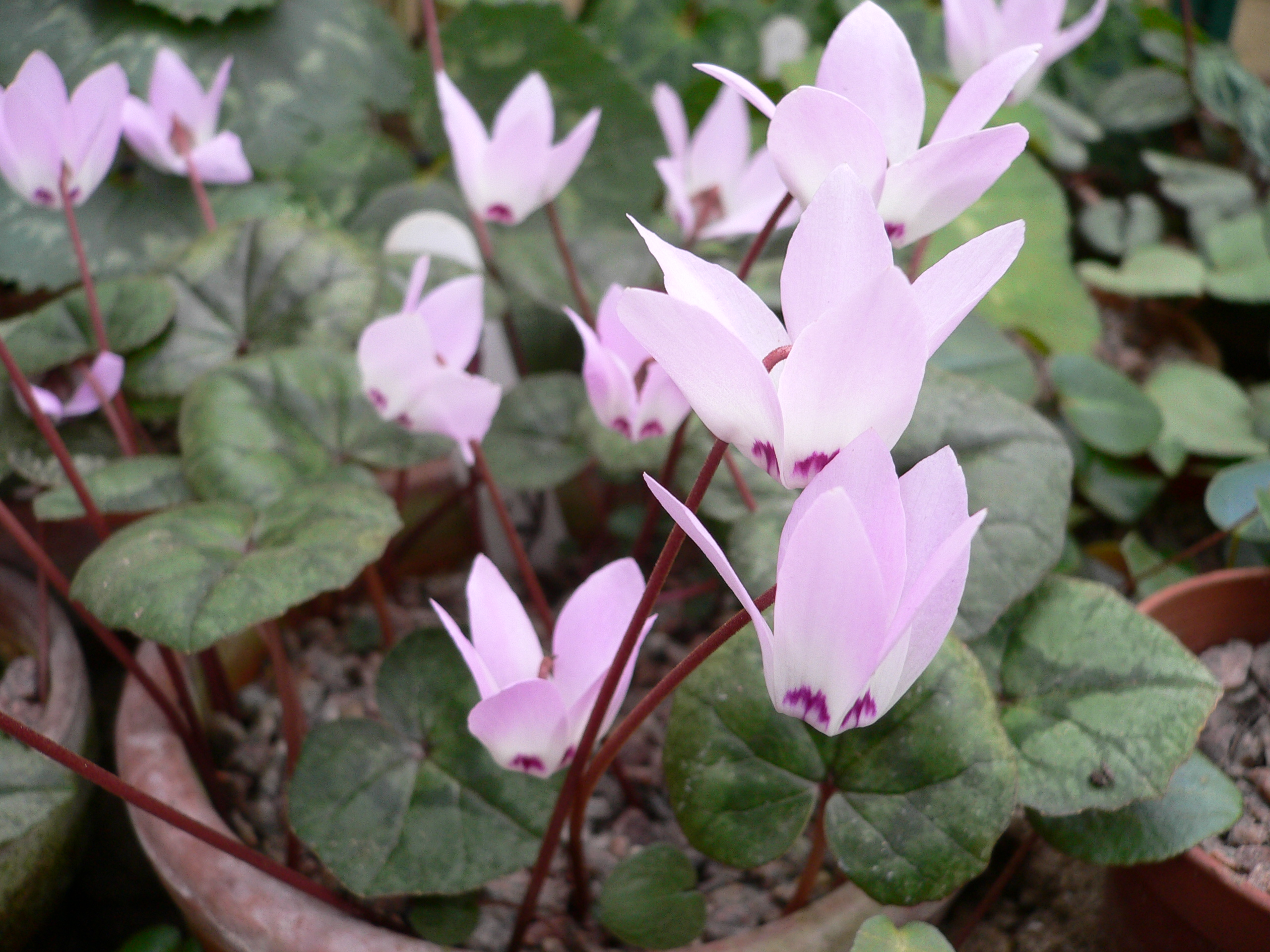
C. libanoticum

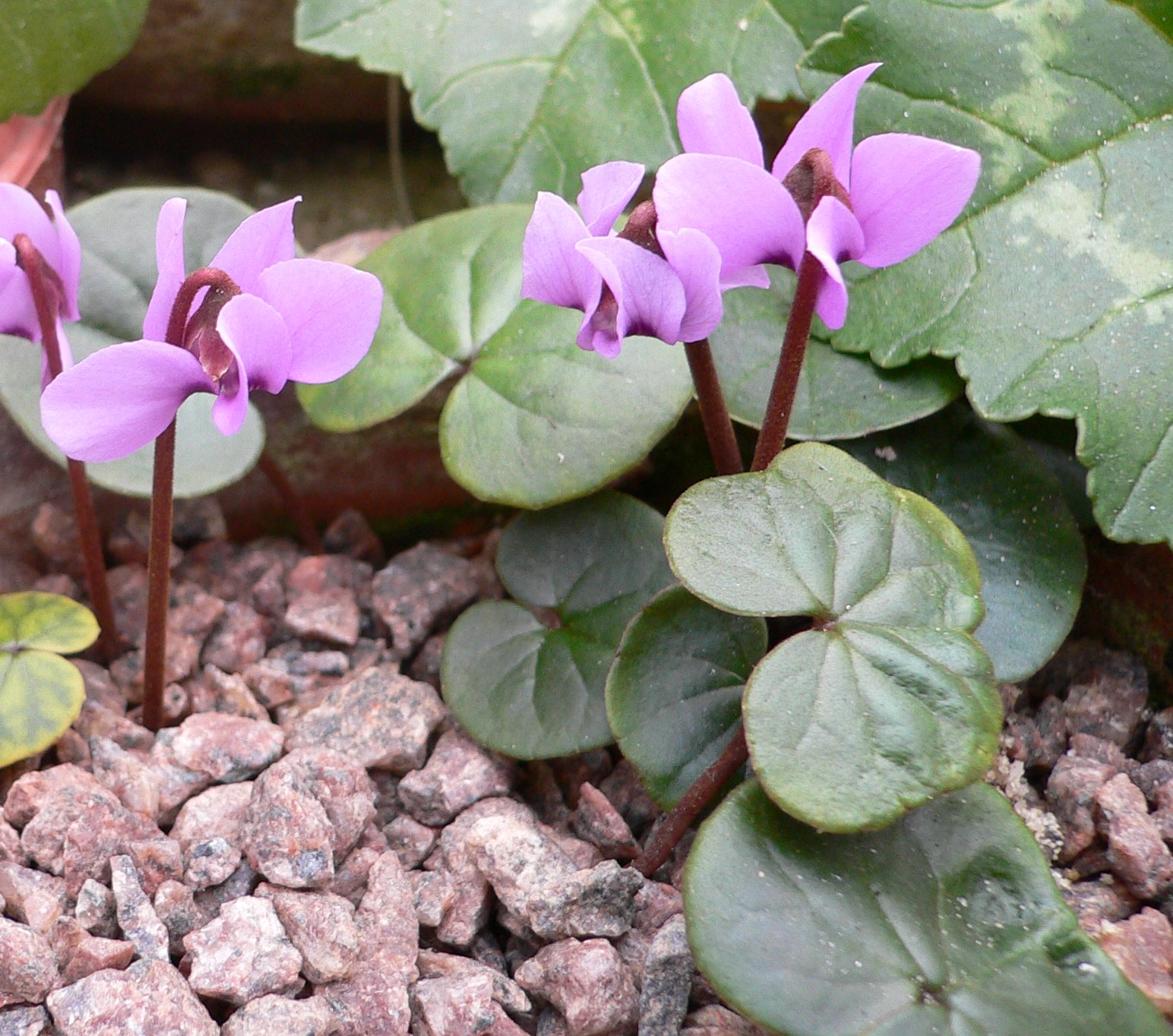
C. parviflorum

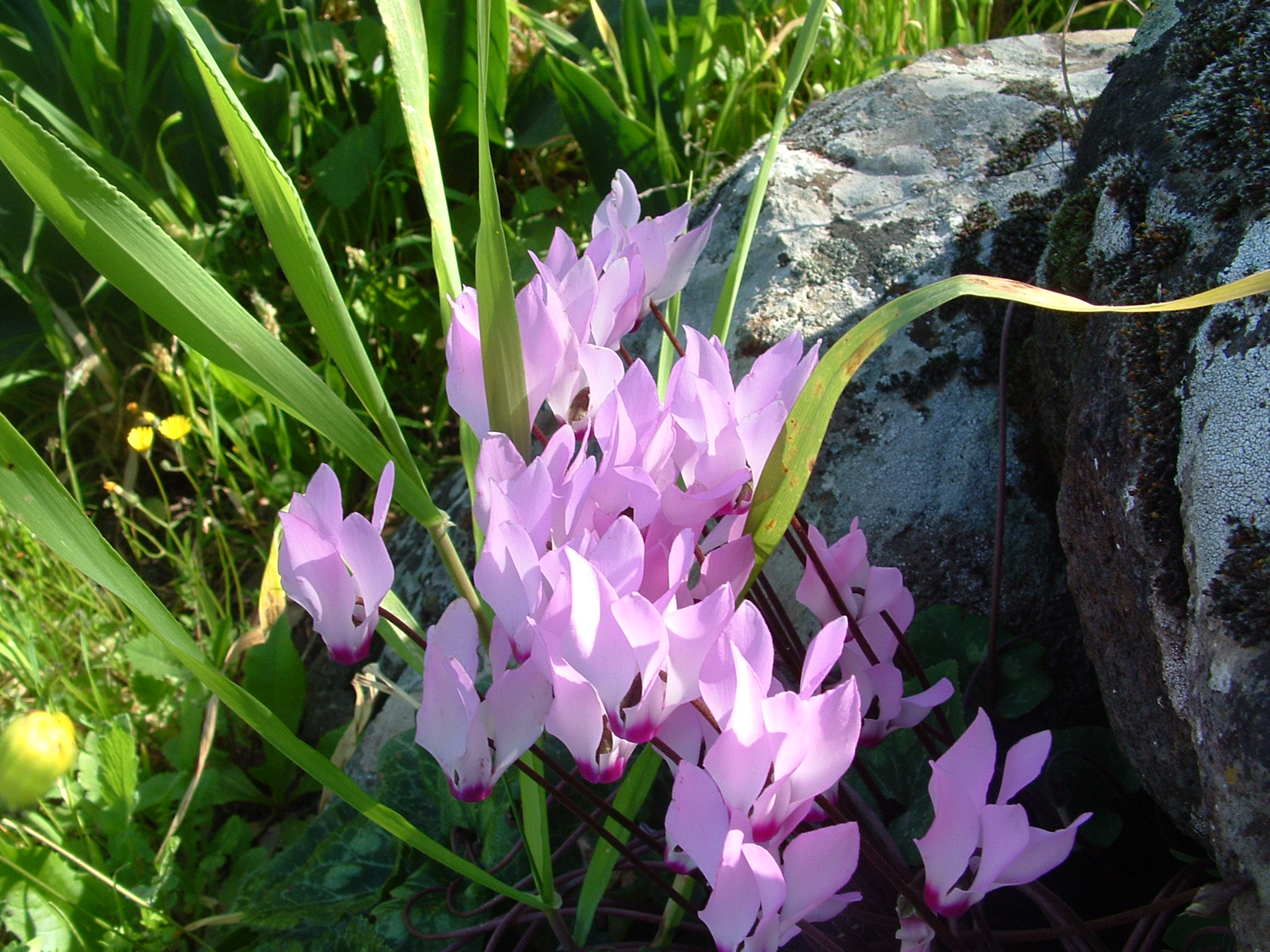
C. persicum

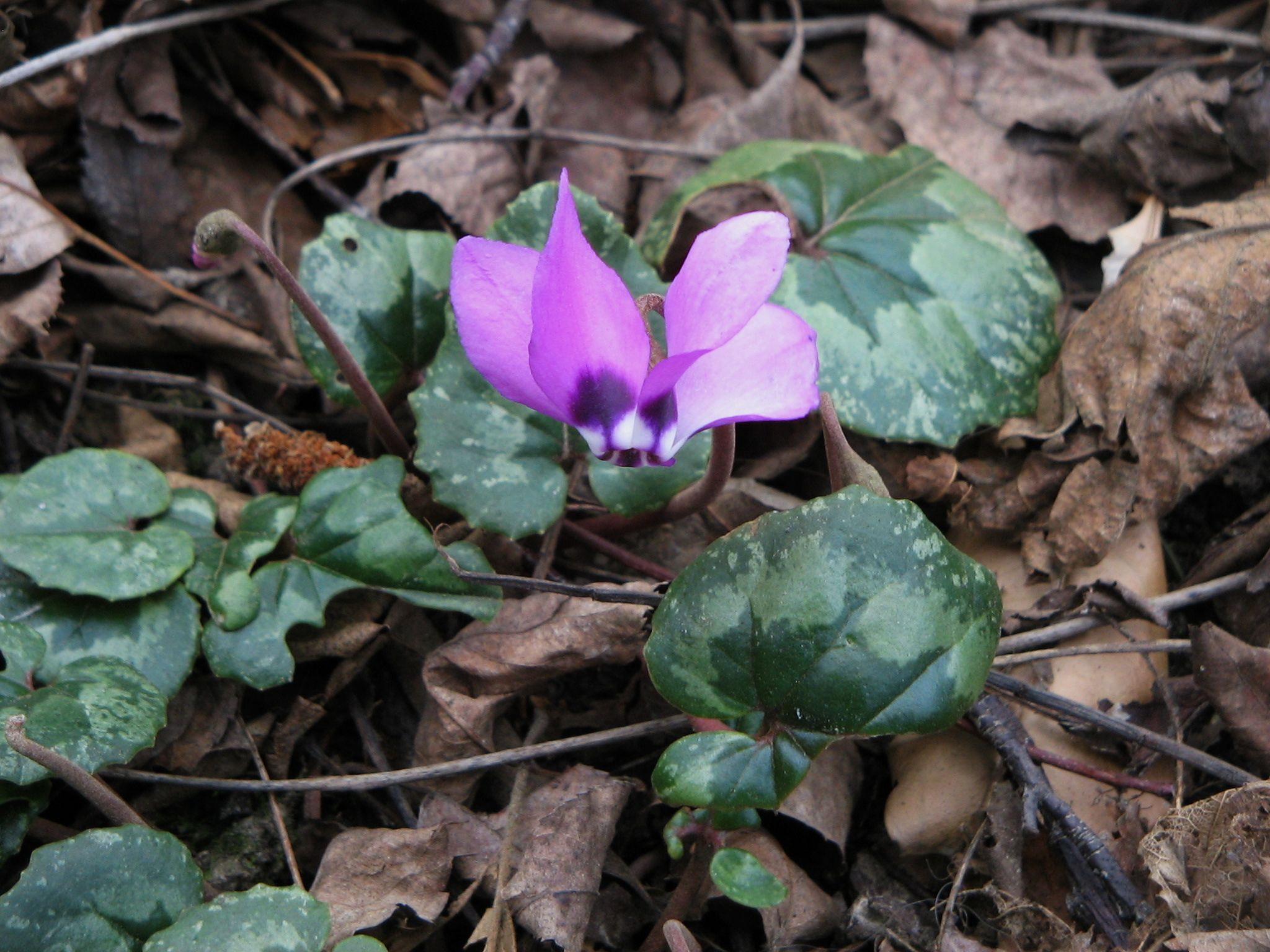
C. pseudibericum

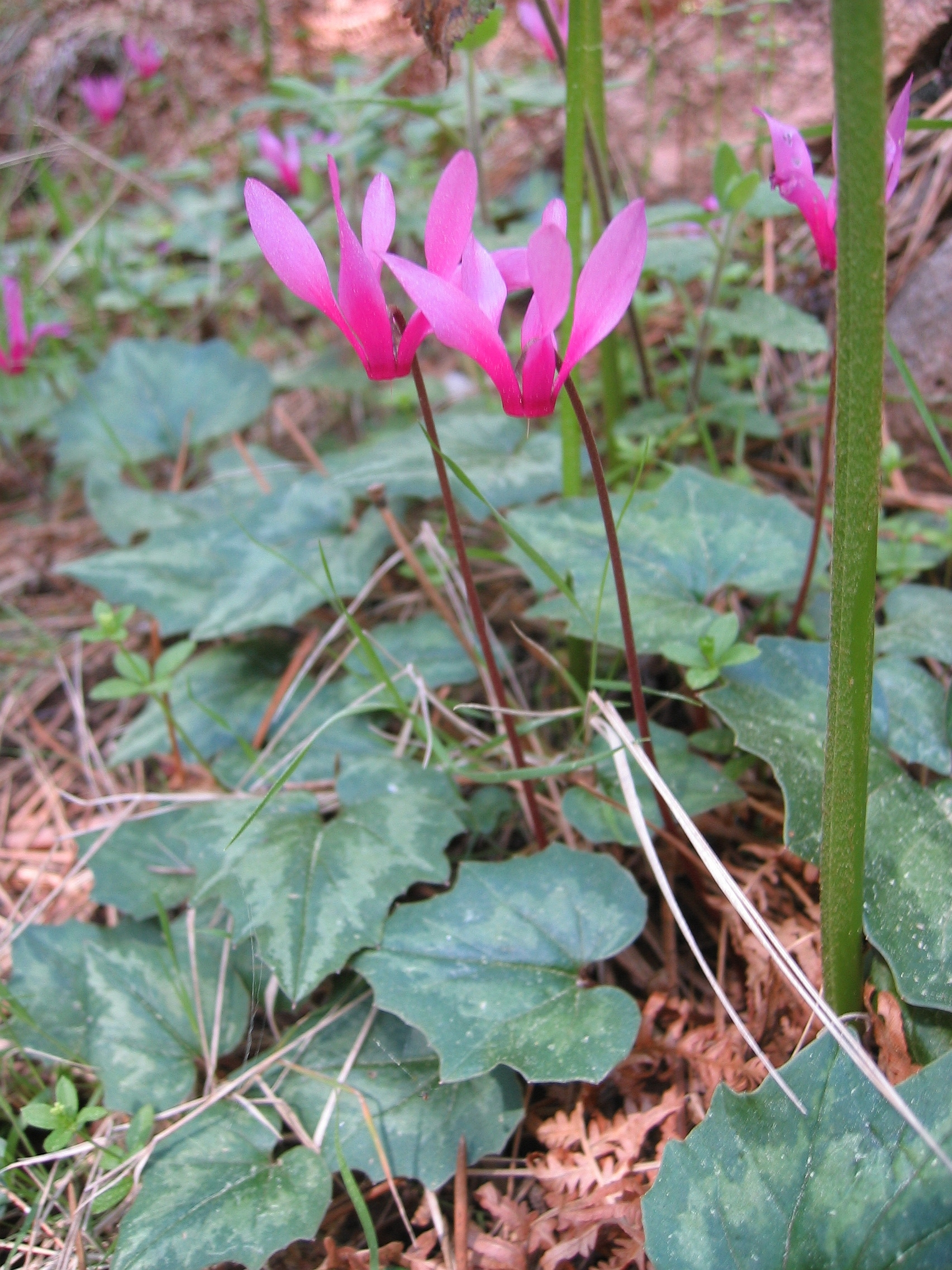
C. repandum

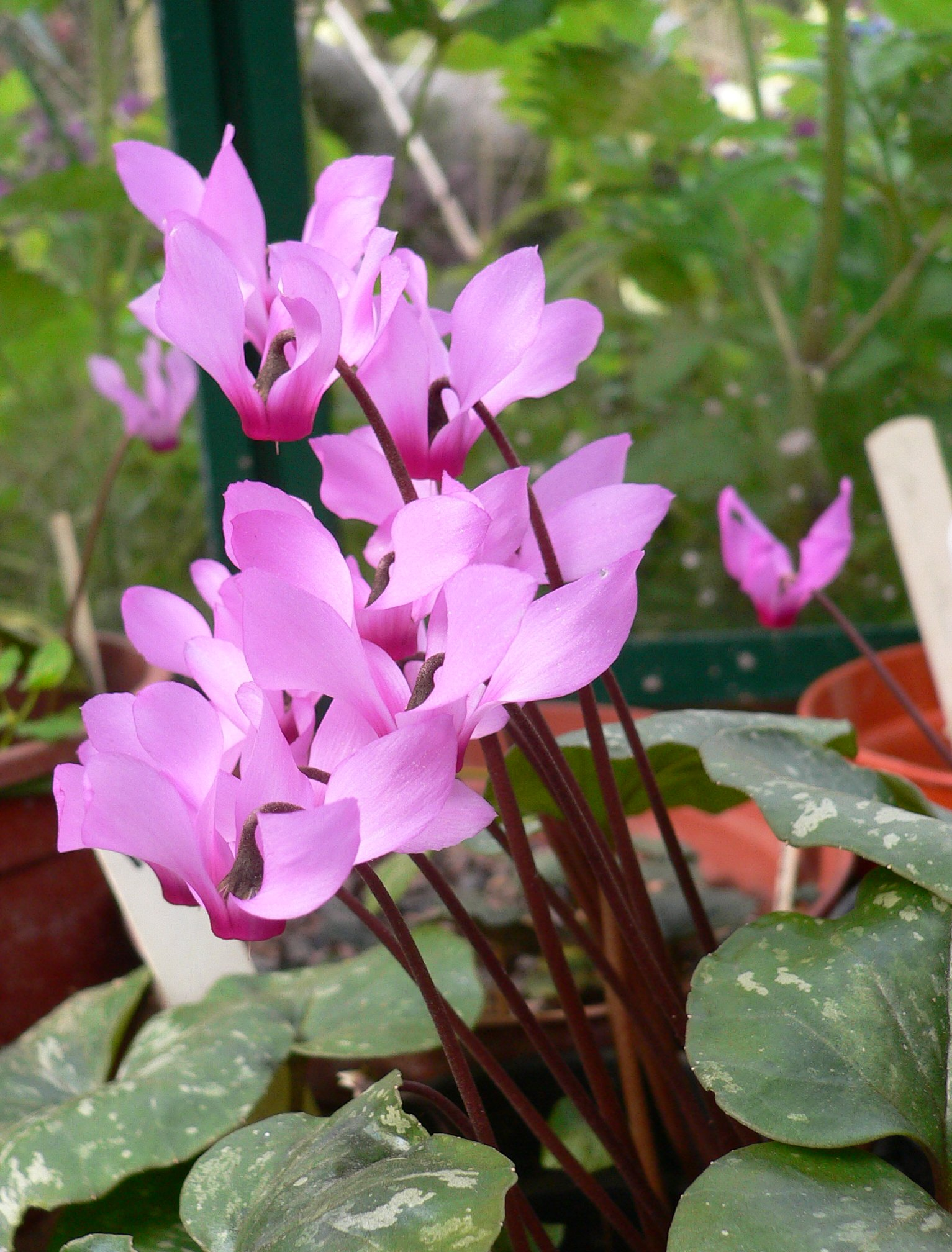
C. rhodium
Summer and autumn

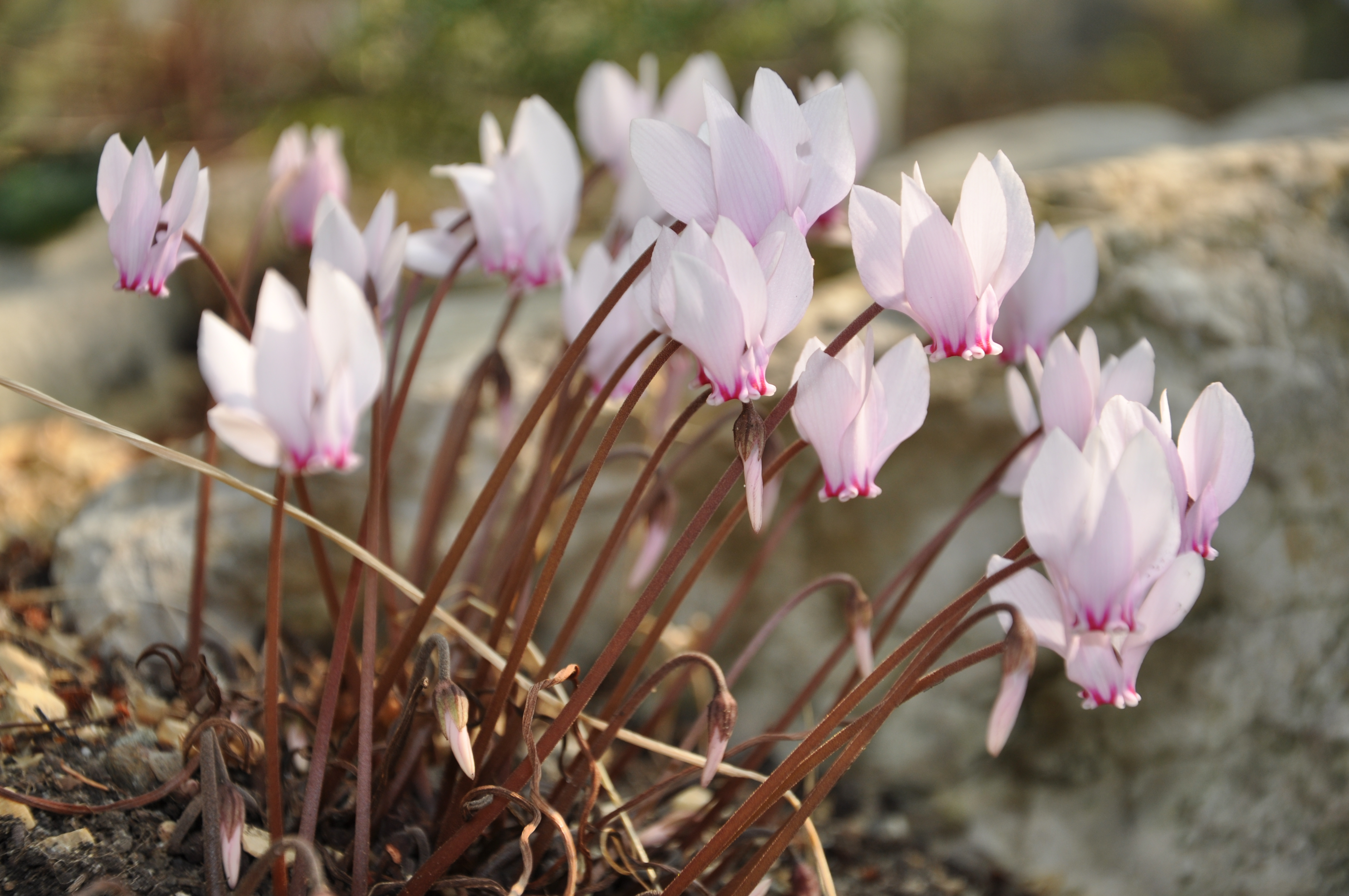
C. africanum

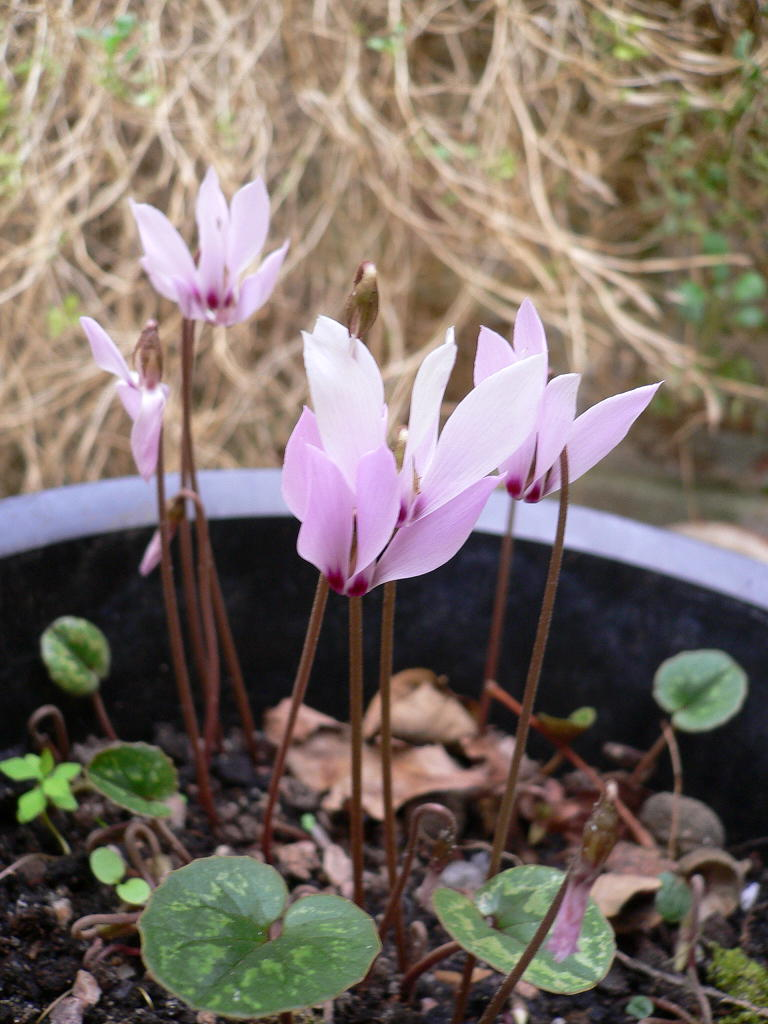
C. cilicium

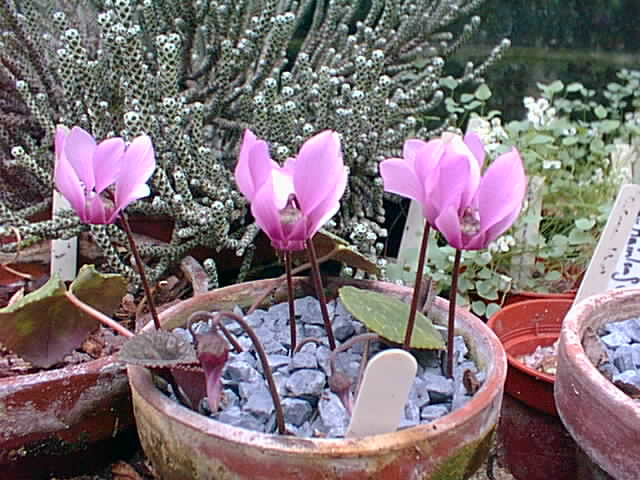
C. colchicum

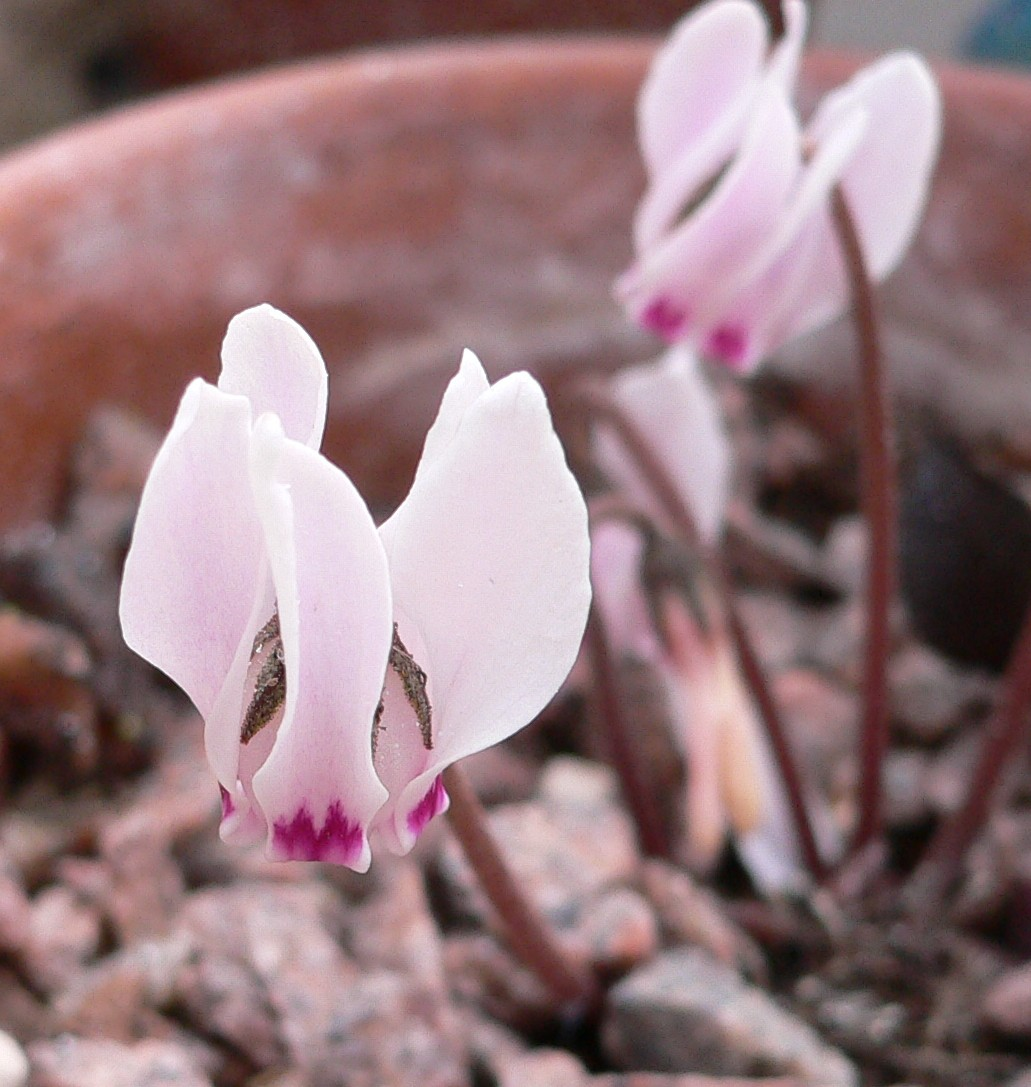
C. cyprium

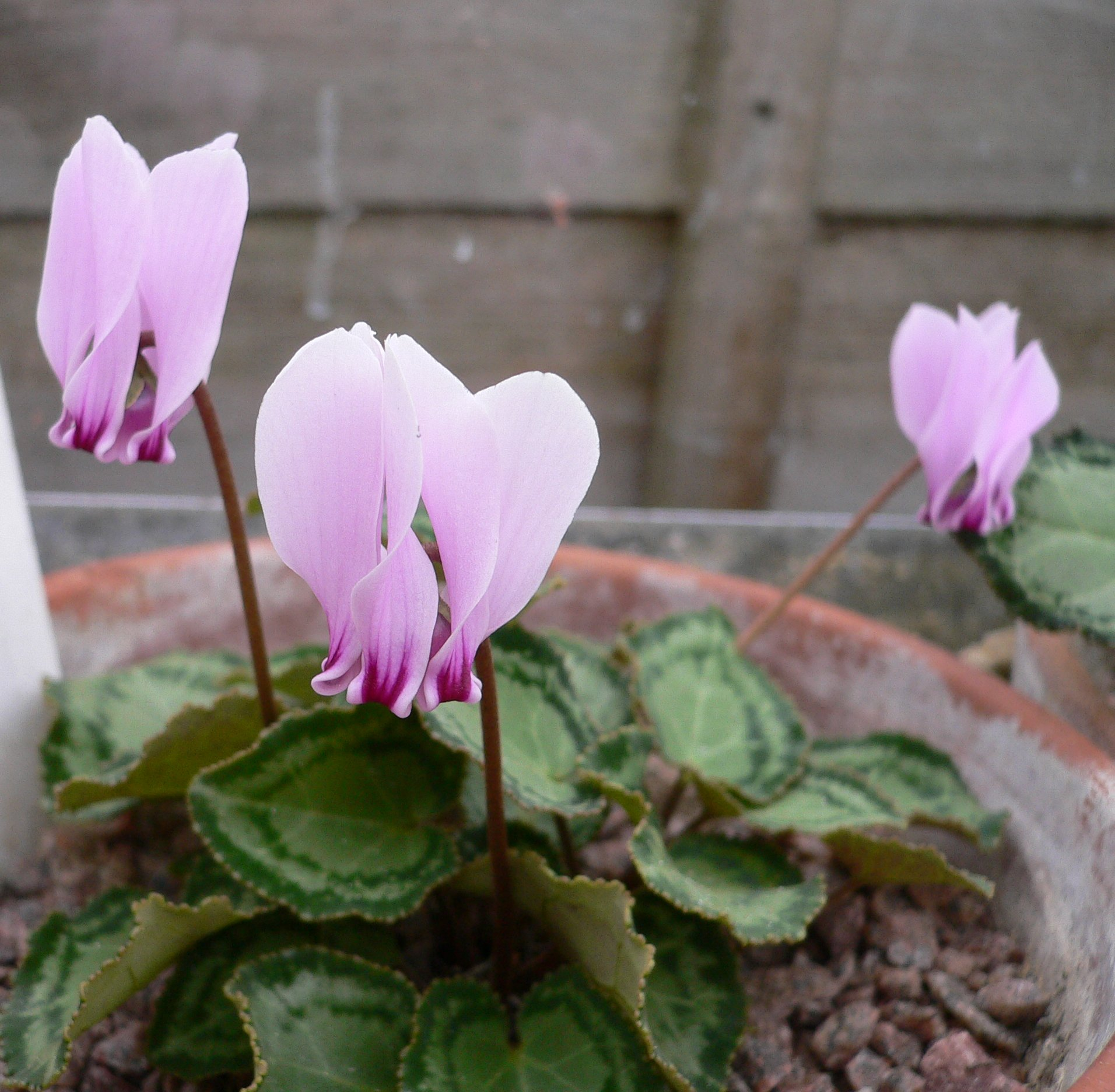
C. graecum

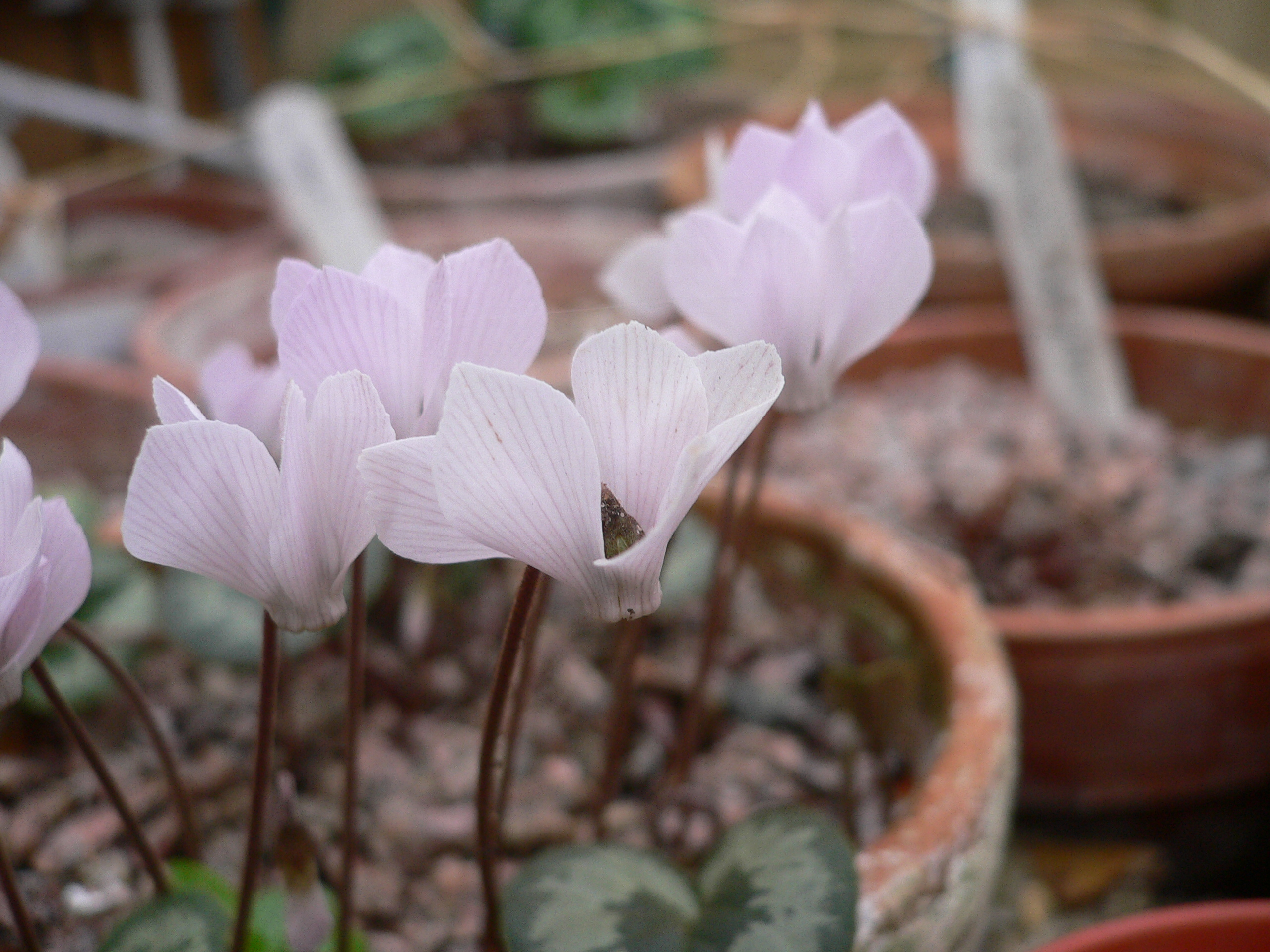
C. intaminatum

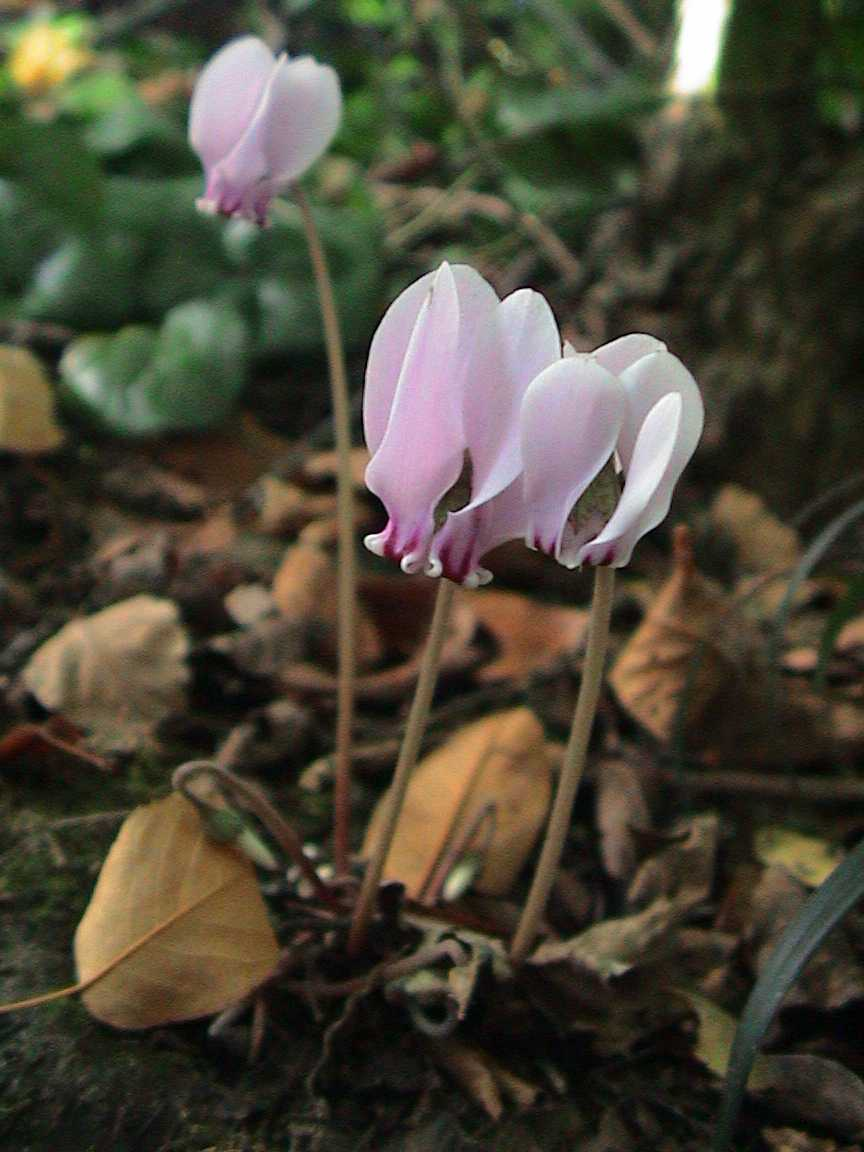
C. hederifolium

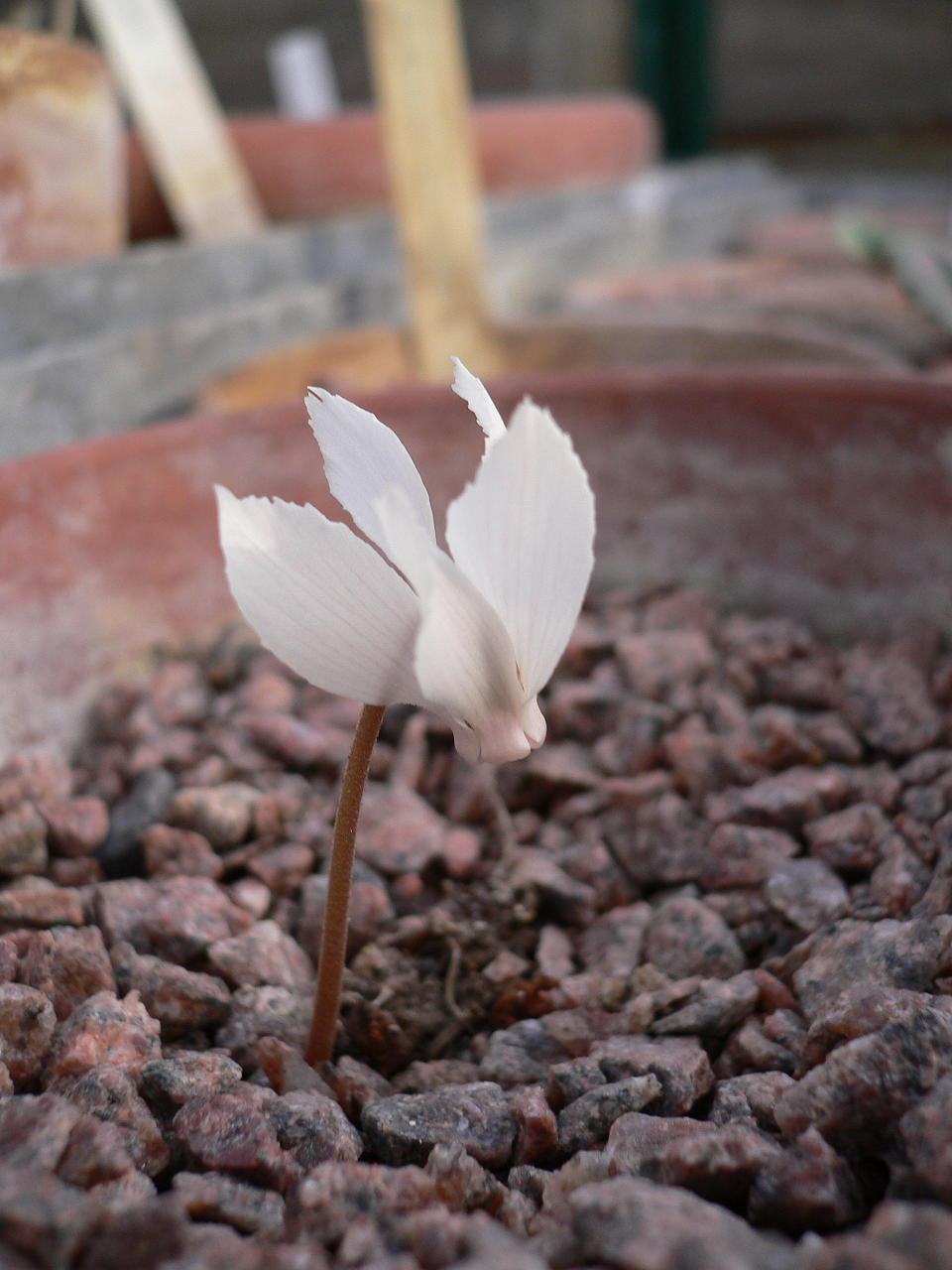
C. mirabile

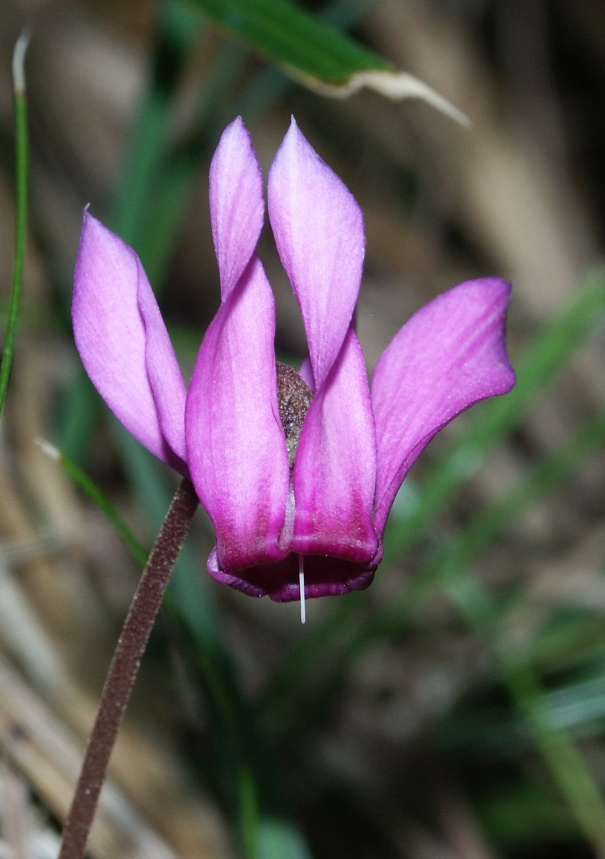
C. purpurascens

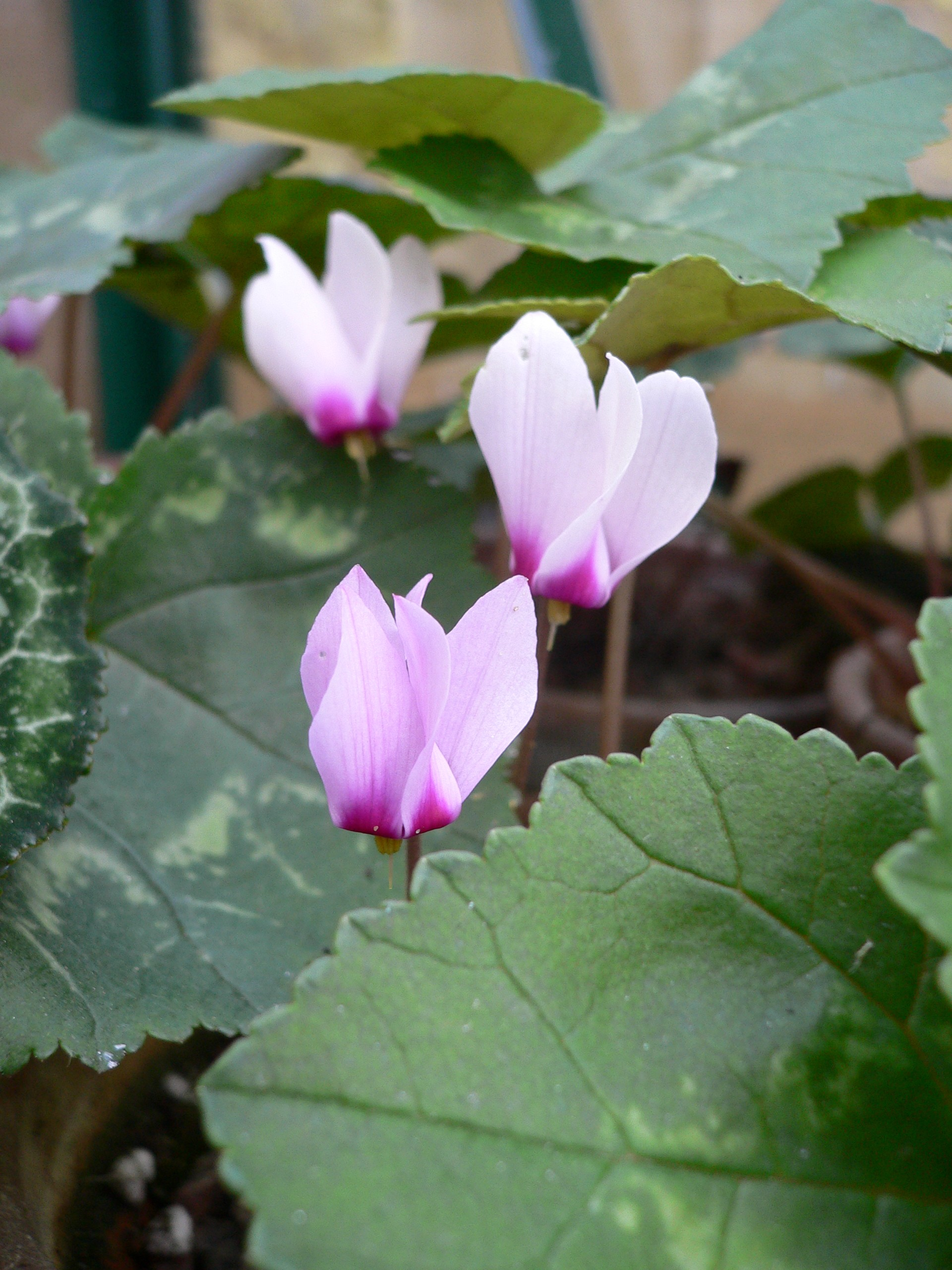
C. rohlfsianum
