= Cyclamen somalense =

Scientific classification
- Kingdom: Plantae
- Clade: Tracheophytes
- Clade: Angiosperms
- Clade: Eudicots
- Clade: Asterids
- Order: Ericales
- Family: Primulaceae
- Genus: Cyclamen
- Species: C. somalense

Binomial name
- Cyclamen somalense Thulin & Warfa

Species of flowering plant

Cyclamen somalense, also known as the Somalian cyclamen, is a species of flowering plant within the genus Cyclamen and family Primulaceae. It is endemic to Somalia, where it is significantly isolated from other Cyclamen species. The species tolerates higher temperatures than most Cyclamen species, being substantially closer to the equator than any other species within the genus.

== Description ==
Cyclamen somalense is a perennial plant, which emerges in the wild during the month of November, depending on the onset of the regions Northeast monsoon. Both the plants leaves and flowers emerge together, sprouting from the tuber.

=== Leaves ===
The leaves of Cyclamen somalense are heart or kidney-shaped, displaying a broad cordate shape with angled edges. They measure between 3 and 10 cm in length and 4 to 12 cm in width and are typically toothed. The upper side of the leaves is deep greyish green and exhibits a well-marked silvery hastate pattern, while the underside of the leaf appears purplish.

=== Flowers and fruit ===
The flowers of Cyclamen somalense typically emerge in the wild during November, depending on the onset of the northeast monsoon. They are pale purplish pink, with a darker pink area surrounding the mouth of the corolla. The corolla lobes of the flowers are reflexed, measuring approximately 15 - 17mm in length and 5 - 7mm in width. They are pointed and exhibit a unique 90° twist, distinguishing them from other cyclamen species. Unlike most cyclamen species, after fertilization occurs, the fruit is produced on a non-coiling pedicel. The flower stalk bends back toward the base of the plant instead of coiling.

=== Tuber ===
Cyclamen somalense is a tuberous geophyte and like all species within the genus Cyclamen grow from tubers. The tuber can be spherical or elongated in shape, displaying two or three swellings. As the tuber matures it will often take the shape of the rock crevice in which it grows. Mature tubers will measure from 3 – 6 cm in diameter. The tuber possesses a rough texture, brown exterior and roots are produced from its base.

== Distribution and habitat ==
Cyclamen somalense is native to the Al Miskat mountains of Northeast Somalia, Africa. It is a unique among Cyclamen species due to being isolated from other species within the genus. The species is part of a relict Mediterranean flora, which has adapted to an environment slightly more severe than the average Mediterranean climate. The region experiences hot and dry summers, as well as warm winters with lower than average rainfall. The plant is typically found growing at altitudes ranging from 1200 to 1600 meters above sea level. The species has a preference for north-facing escarpments and cliff faces, where it grows within water worn pockets or crevices within the limestone rock.

== Cultivation ==
Cyclamen somalense is currently the only species within the genus that isn't within general cultivation. The only known plants in cultivation belong to the University of Uppsala Botanical Garden of Sweden, who possesses multiple plants, however they are genetic clones making seed production unlikely.
