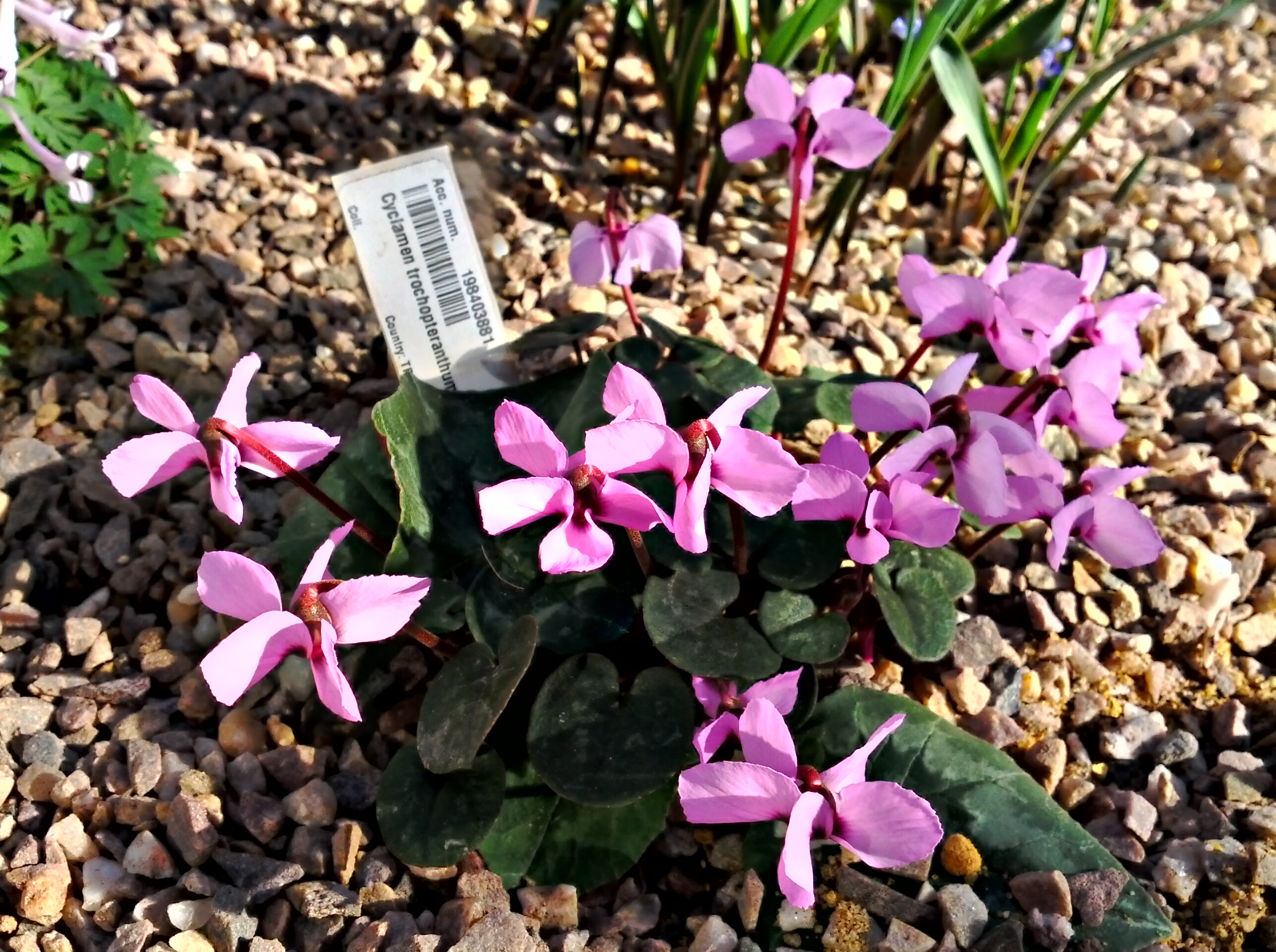

Scientific classification
- Kingdom: Plantae
- Clade: Embryophytes
- Clade: Tracheophytes
- Clade: Angiosperms
- Clade: Eudicots
- Clade: Asterids
- Order: Ericales
- Family: Primulaceae
- Genus: Cyclamen
- Subgenus: C. subg. Gyrophoebe
- Species: C. alpinum

Binomial name
- Cyclamen alpinum Dammann ex. Springer

Synonyms
- Cyclamen trochopteranthum O.Schwarz

= Cyclamen alpinum =

Species of flowering plant

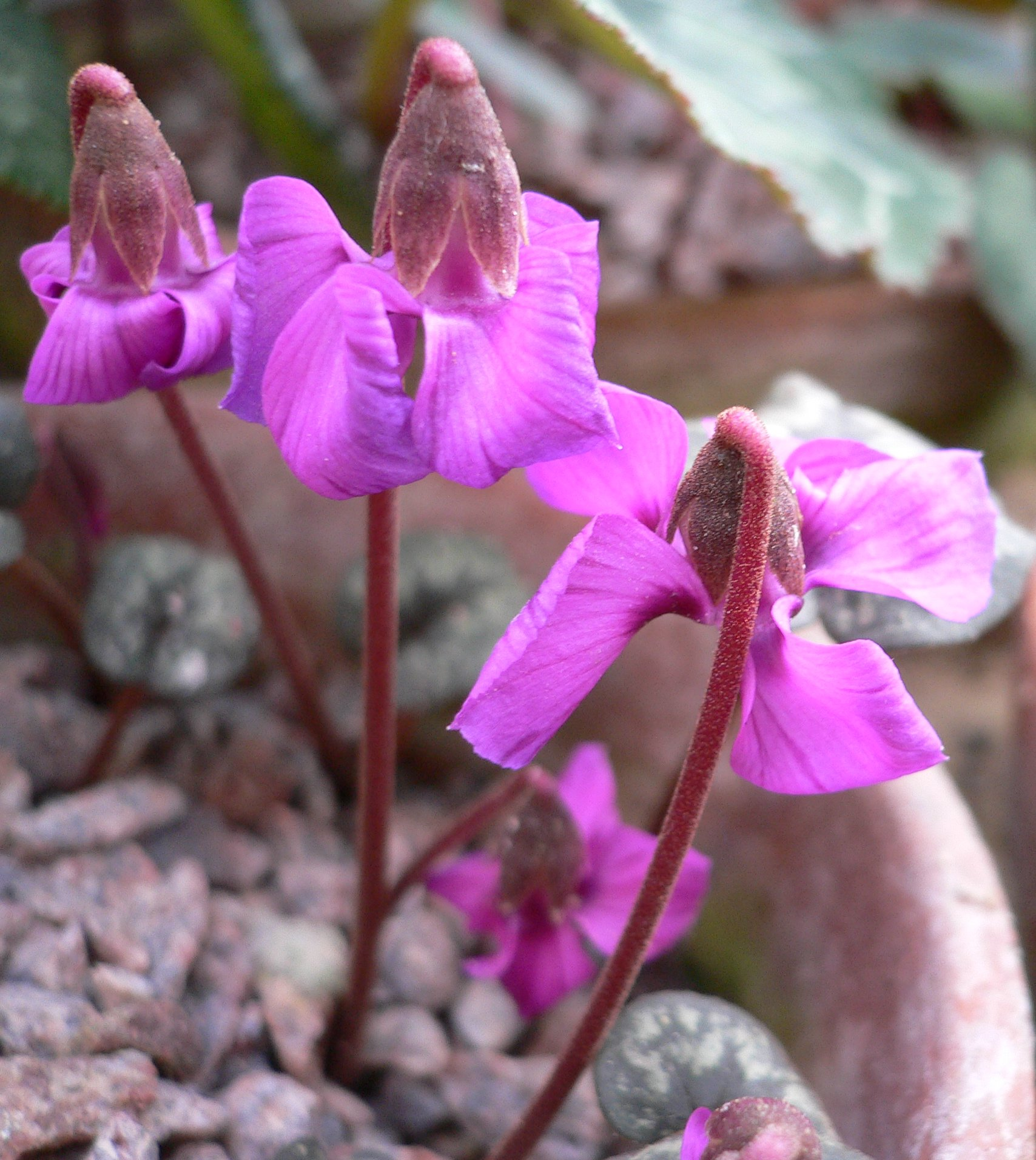

Cyclamen alpinum (= Cyclamen trochopteranthum) is a perennial plant growing from a tuber, native to an area of southwestern Turkey, northwest of Antalya. It is isolated from other species of the Cyclamen coum group.

== Name ==
The alternate species name trochopteranthum comes from Greek trochós "wheel" and pterón "feather", "wing", probably meaning "propeller" and ánthos "flower".

The scientific name Cyclamen alpinum has been applied to three other species as well: Cyclamen coum, Cyclamen cilicium, and Cyclamen intaminatum (as a variety of C. cilicium).

== Description ==
Leaves are oval to round, green and often variegated with silver above (unlike the similar species Cyclamen parviflorum, which is entirely green) and red-purple below.

The flowers have five petals, pale rose-pink to pink-carmine or white with a dark magenta spot at the nose. The petals are spreading rather than fully upswept and often twisted like the blades of a propeller, as in Cyclamen parviflorum var. subalpinum.

== Distribution ==
It is found in south west Turkey, in Turkish pine, juniper, sweetgum, or cedar woodland at 350–1,500 m (1,150–4,920 ft) above sea level.

== Forms ==
Cyclamen alpinum forma leucanthum (= Cyclamen alpinum forma album) has white petals.
