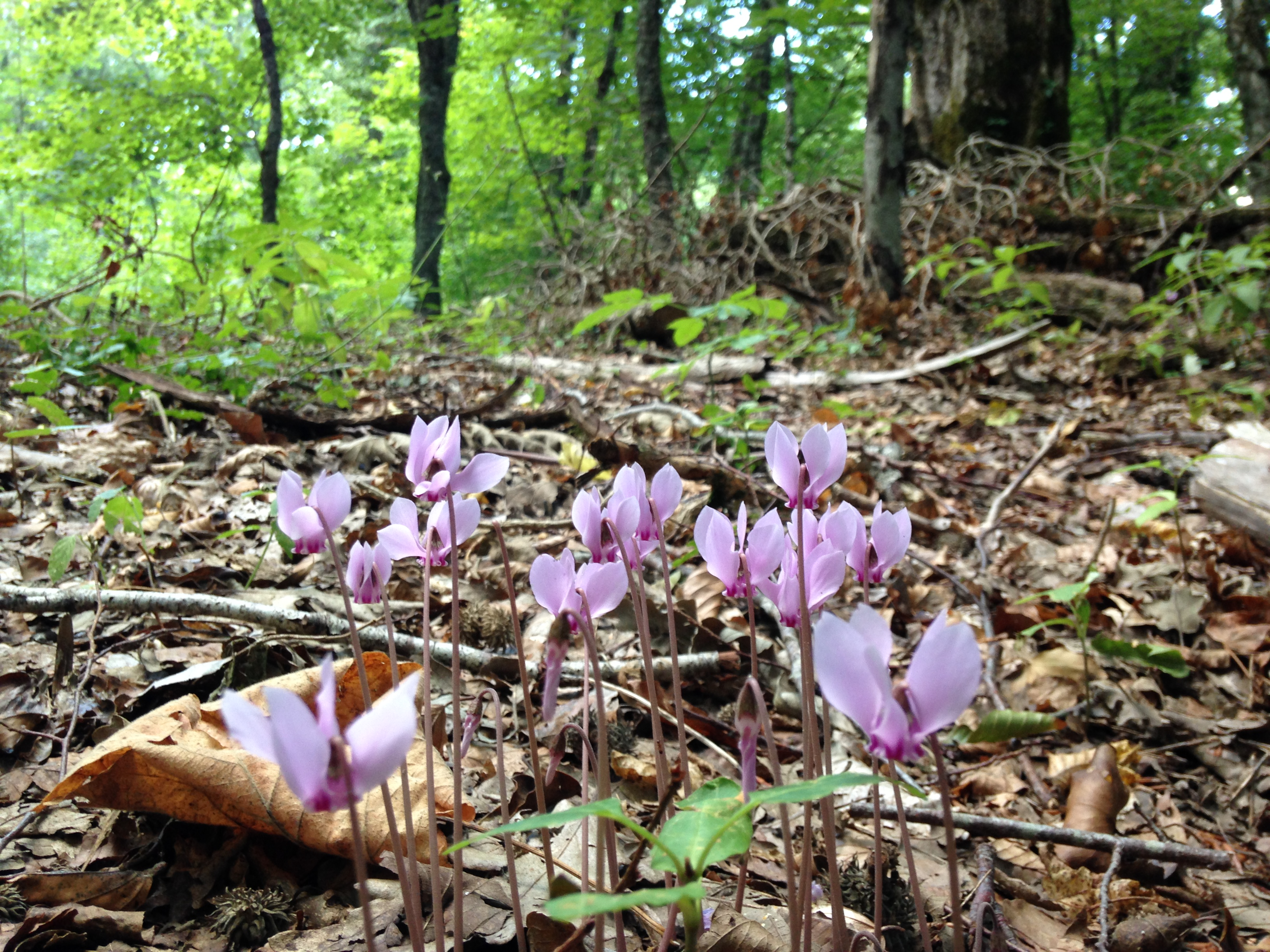
- Cyclamen hederifolium subsp. hederifolium in flower in the Riserva naturale Montedimezzo in Molise, Italy

Conservation status
- Least Concern (IUCN 3.1)

Scientific classification
- Kingdom: Plantae
- Clade: Embryophytes
- Clade: Tracheophytes
- Clade: Spermatophytes
- Clade: Angiosperms
- Clade: Eudicots
- Clade: Asterids
- Order: Ericales
- Family: Primulaceae
- Genus: Cyclamen
- Species: C. hederifolium

Binomial name
- Cyclamen hederifolium Aiton

Synonyms
- Cyclamen neapolitanum Ten.

= Cyclamen hederifolium =

Species of flowering plant in the primrose family

Cyclamen hederifolium, sowbread, or ivy-leaved cyclamen, is a species of flowering plant in the family Primulaceae, native to woodland, shrubland, and rocky areas at altitudes of up to 1,200 metres in the Mediterranean region from southern France to western Turkey and on Mediterranean islands. It is also naturalised farther north in Europe and in Oregon. This widespread cyclamen species is widely cultivated and among the most hardy and vigorous in oceanic climates.

== Taxonomy ==
Two subspecies are accepted:

- Cyclamen hederifolium subsp. hederifolium — throughout the range of the species, except as below
- Cyclamen hederifolium subsp. crassifolium (Hildebr.) Culham, Denney & P.Moore — southern Greece

Another related cyclamen from Crete, formerly known as Cyclamen hederifolium var. confusum, is now treated as a separate species, Cyclamen confusum.

== Etymology ==
The species name hederifolium comes from the Latin hedera (ivy) and folium (leaf), because of the shape and patterning of the leaves. The synonym C. neapolitanum refers to Naples, where the species grows.

== Description ==
Cyclamen hederifolium is a tuberous perennial growing up to 30 cm tall that flowers and produces leaves in autumn, grows through the winter, and aestivates through the summer after the seed capsules ripen and open.

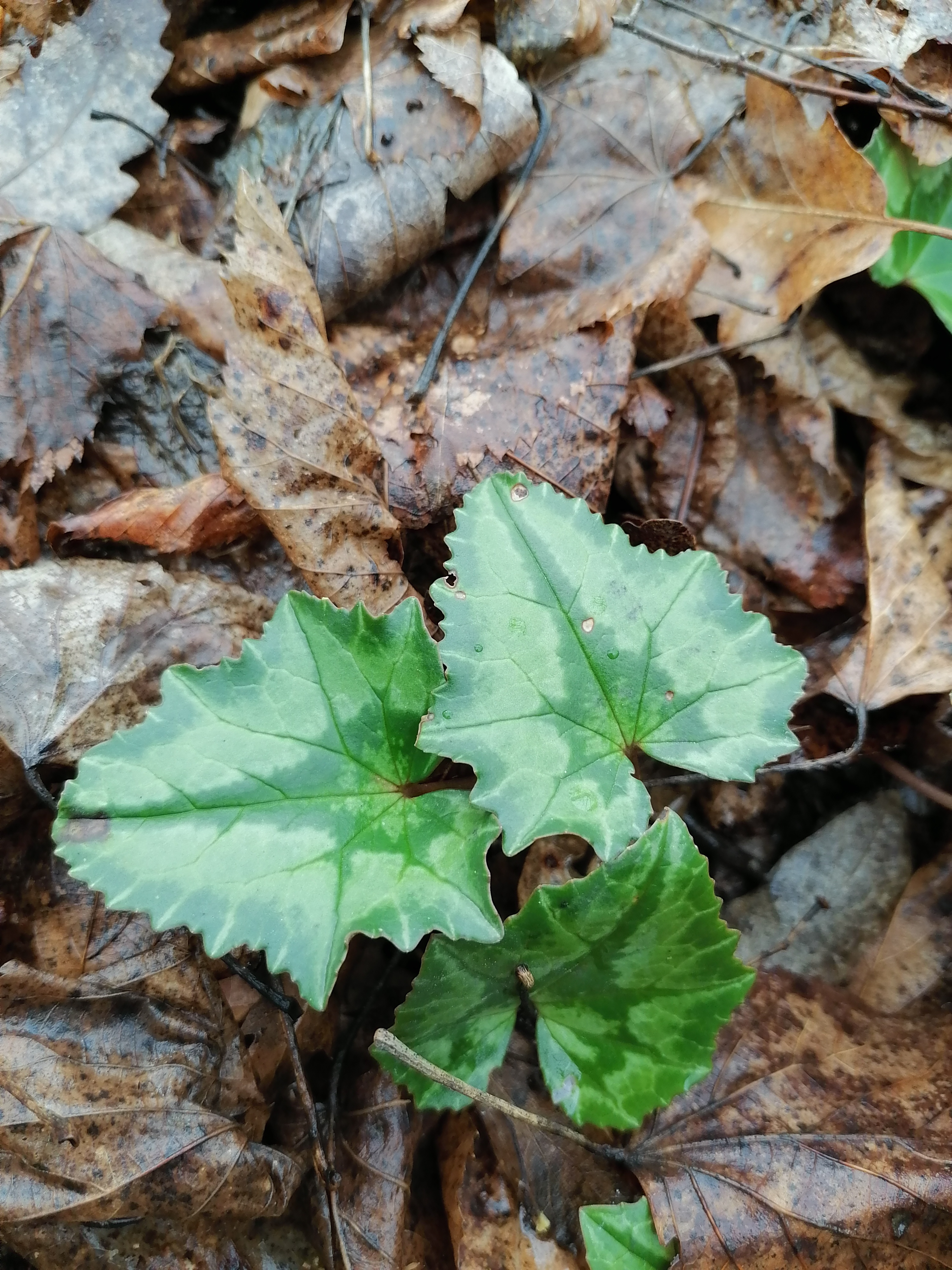
Leaves of C. hederifolium in Serbia

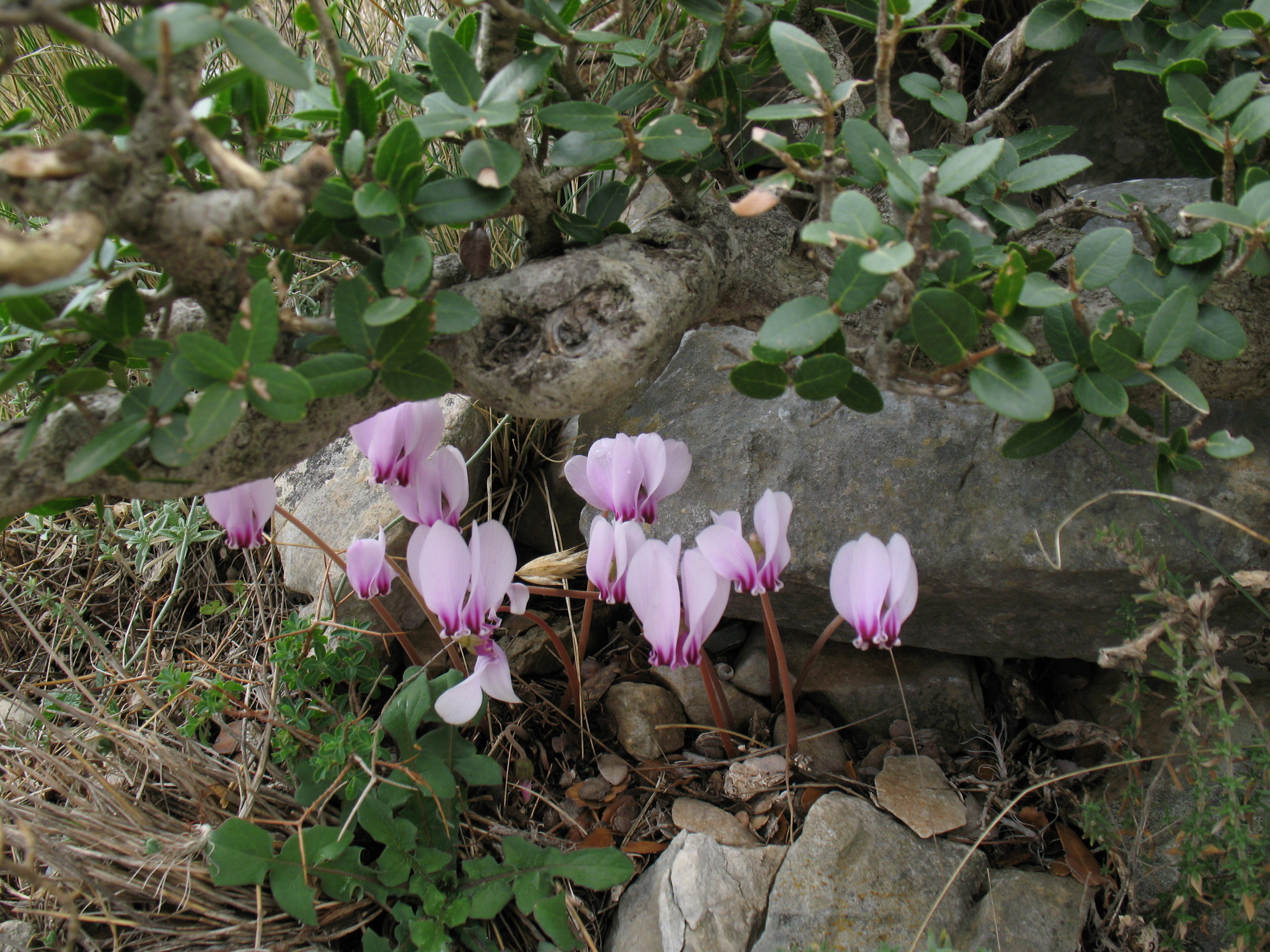
C. h. subsp. crassifolium in Messenia in southern Greece

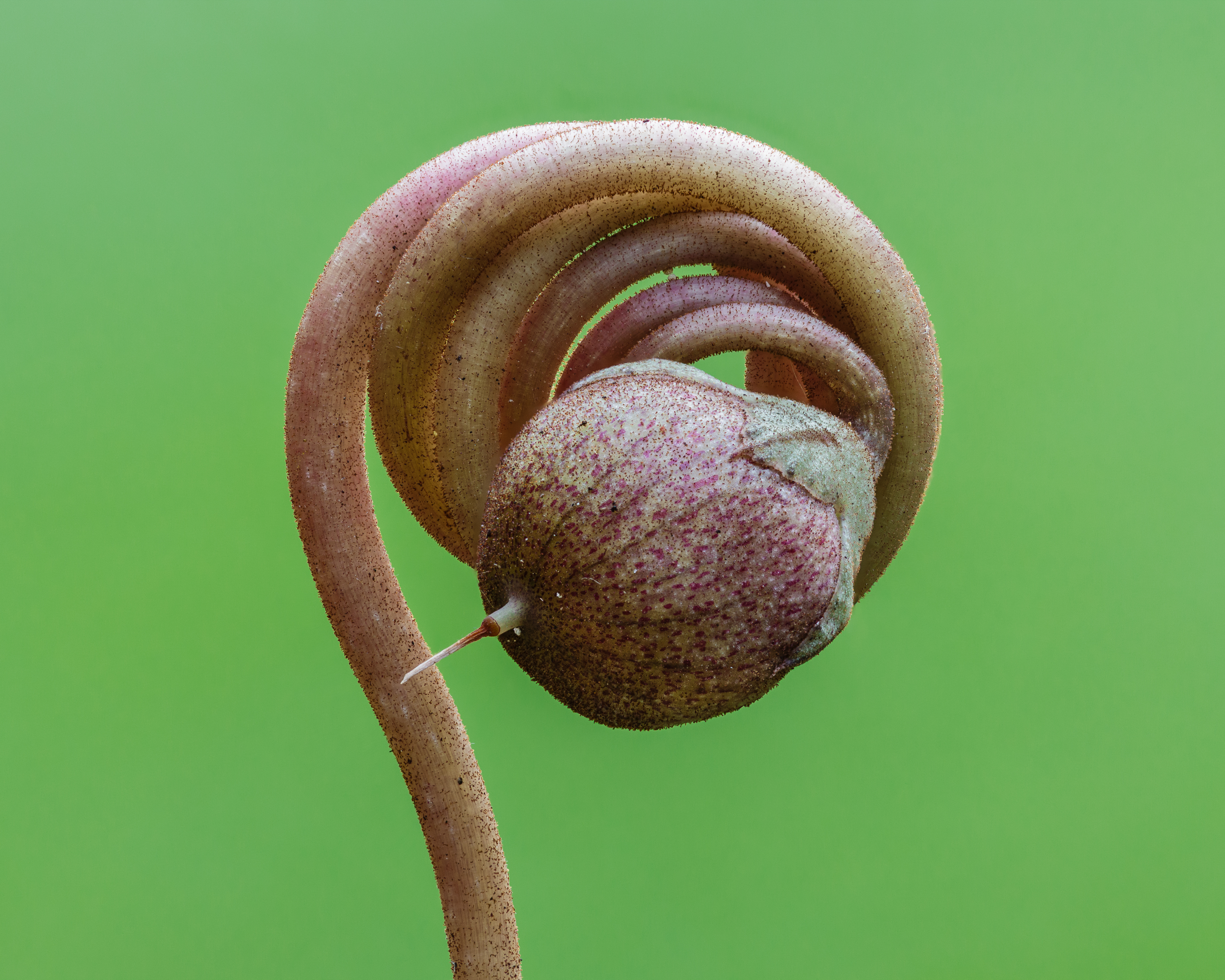
Seed capsule on a spiralled stem

=== Tuber ===
The tuber is round-flattened and produces roots from the top and sides, leaving the base bare. In some other cyclamens (e.g. Cyclamen persicum), the roots come from the bottom, leaving the top and sides bare. The tuber becomes larger with age; older specimens commonly become more than 20 cm (8 in) across. The leaves and flowers grow from buds on the exposed upper surface of the tuber.

=== Leaves ===
The leaves are 2.5–8 cm long, variable in shape; depending on the specimen, the leaf shape varies from heart-shaped to long and arrow-shaped, usually with 2–3 angled lobes on each side, resembling the juvenile leaves of ivy (Hedera). They are naturally variegated, most commonly with a hastate pattern in silver to grey-green and various shades of green. In cultivation, plants have been selected where the leaves can be from all-green to all-silver.

The petiole and flower stalks of Cyclamen hederifolium grow outwards and then up, forming an "elbow". From Latin, 'hederifolium' translates to ivy-like leaves. In the closely related Cyclamen africanum, the stalks grow up from the tuber without a bend near the base.

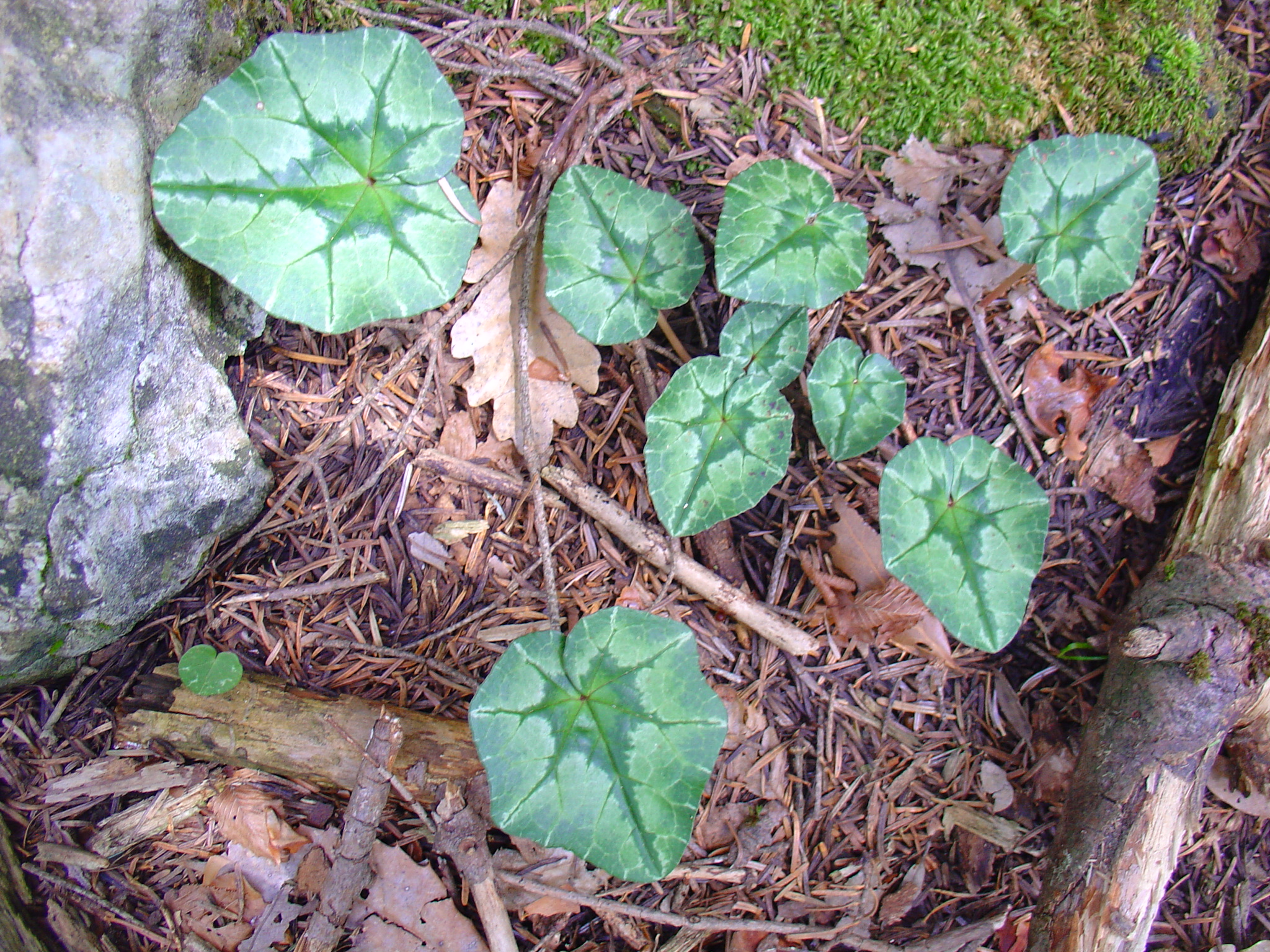
Typical leaves, Mount Olympus, Greece

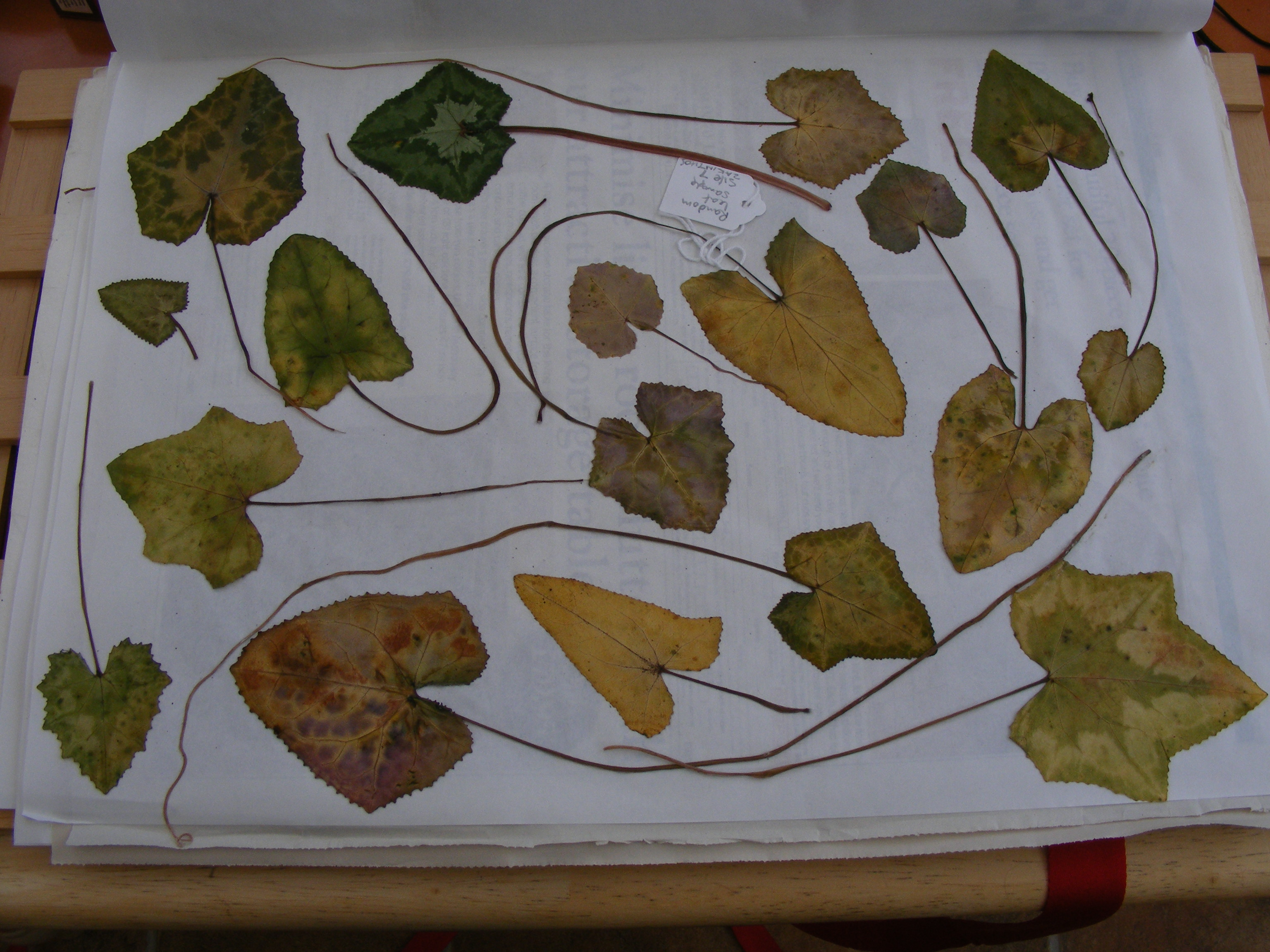
Leaves collected on Zakynthos, showing range of leaf shapes

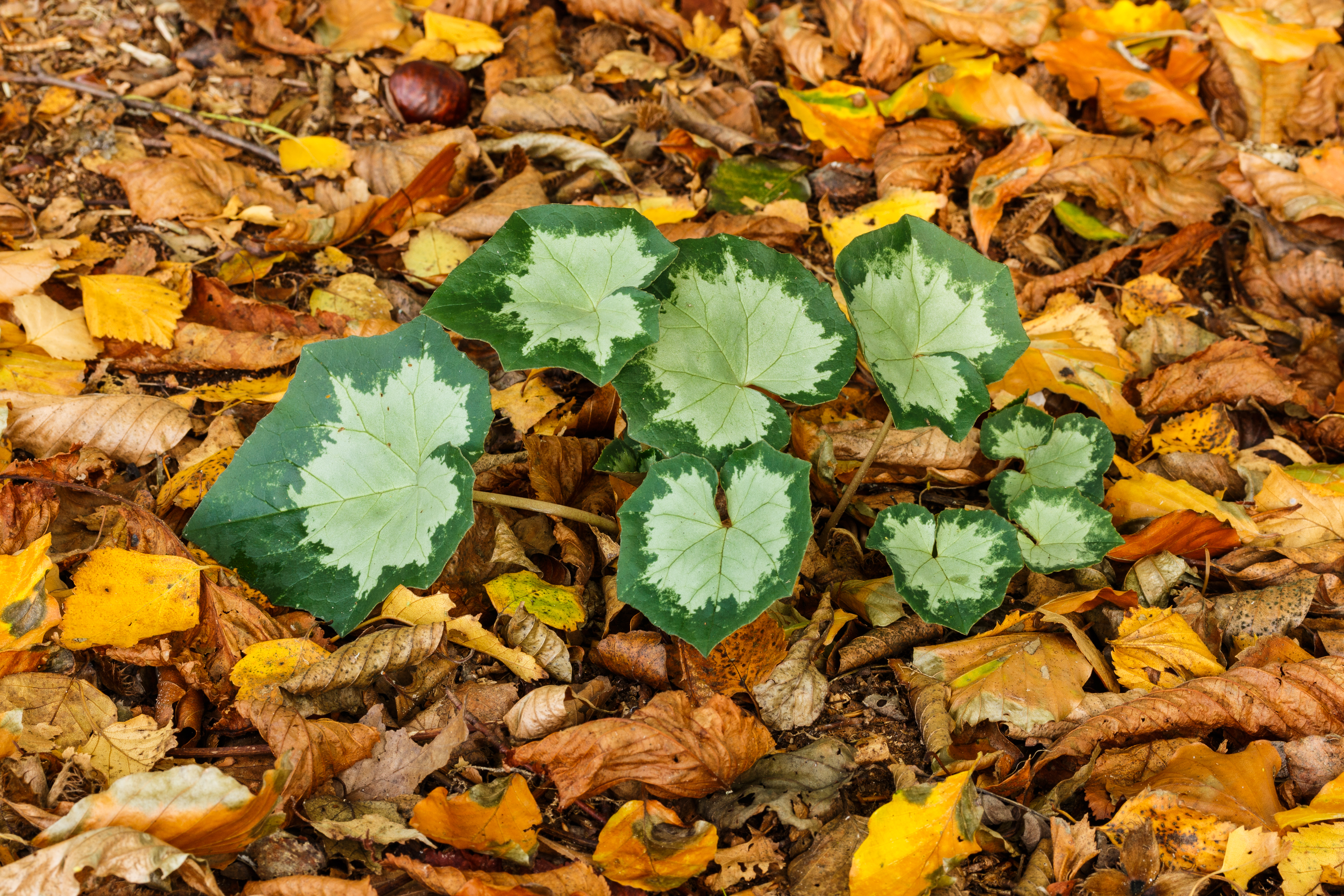
New leaves among fallen autumn leaves

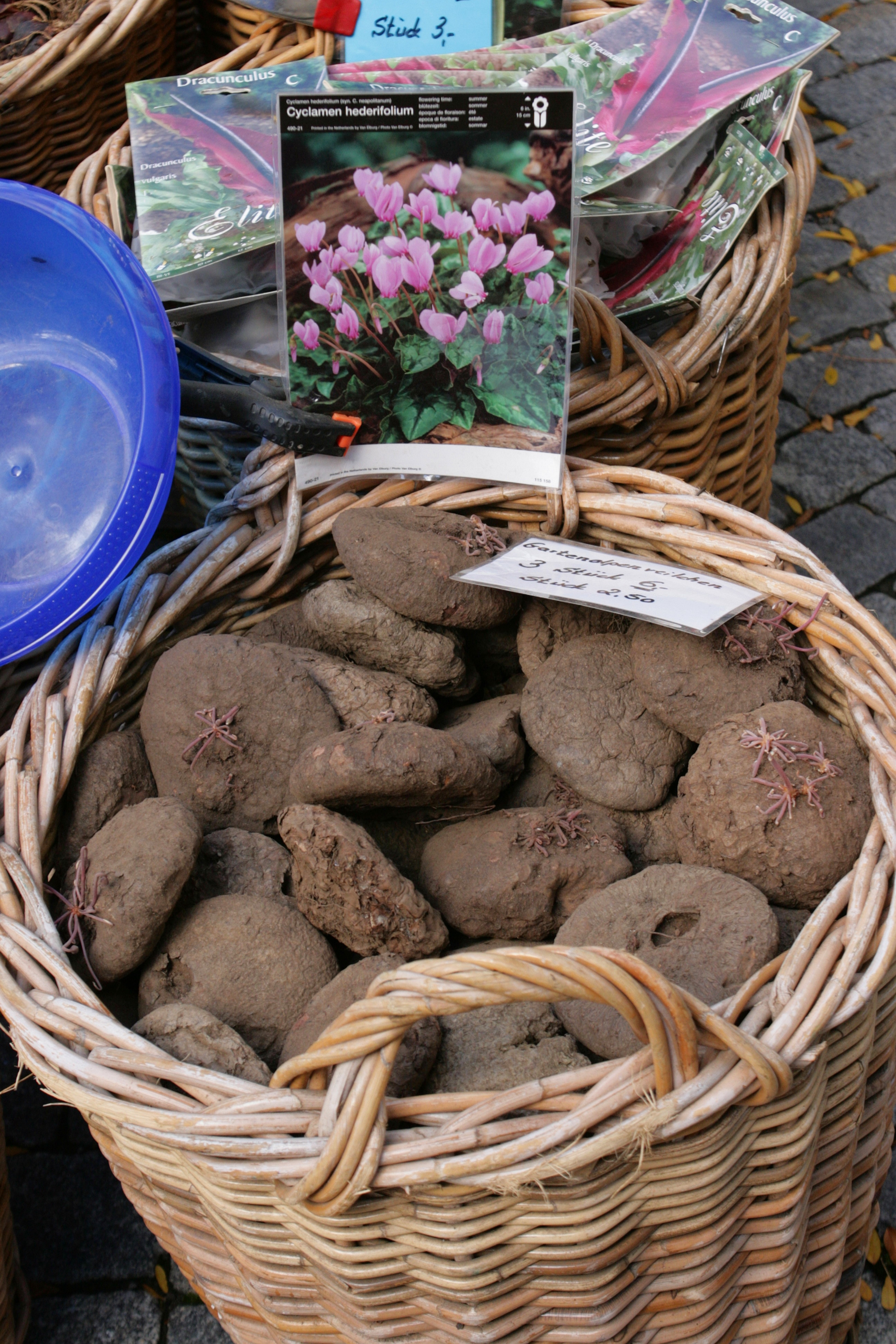
Dried tubers at market in Remscheid, Germany

=== Flowers ===
The flowers are produced from late summer to autumn before the leaves; they have five petals 1.2–2.5 cm long; usually pink, purple, or white with a streaky magenta V-shaped marking on the throat, but sometimes pure white with no markings. They are self-fertile, producing seed without the need for pollination.

The edges of the petals near the tip of the flower are curved outwards into strong auricles. The style protrudes only minimally out of the throat of the flower. These are not present in some other species, such as C. persicum. The flowers are occasionally fragrant. The shape of the flower varies from long and thin to short and squat.

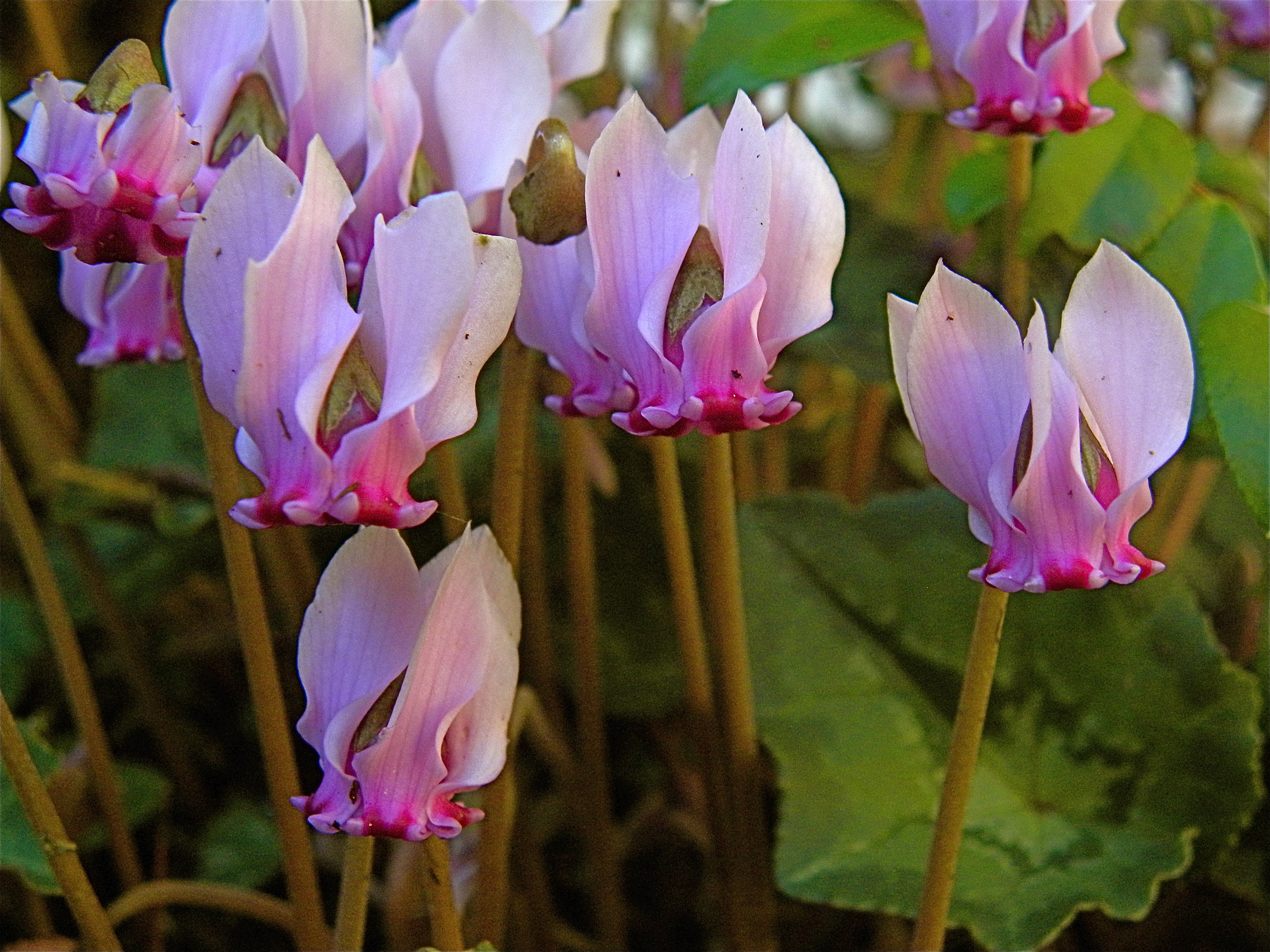
Flowers with particularly prominent auricles

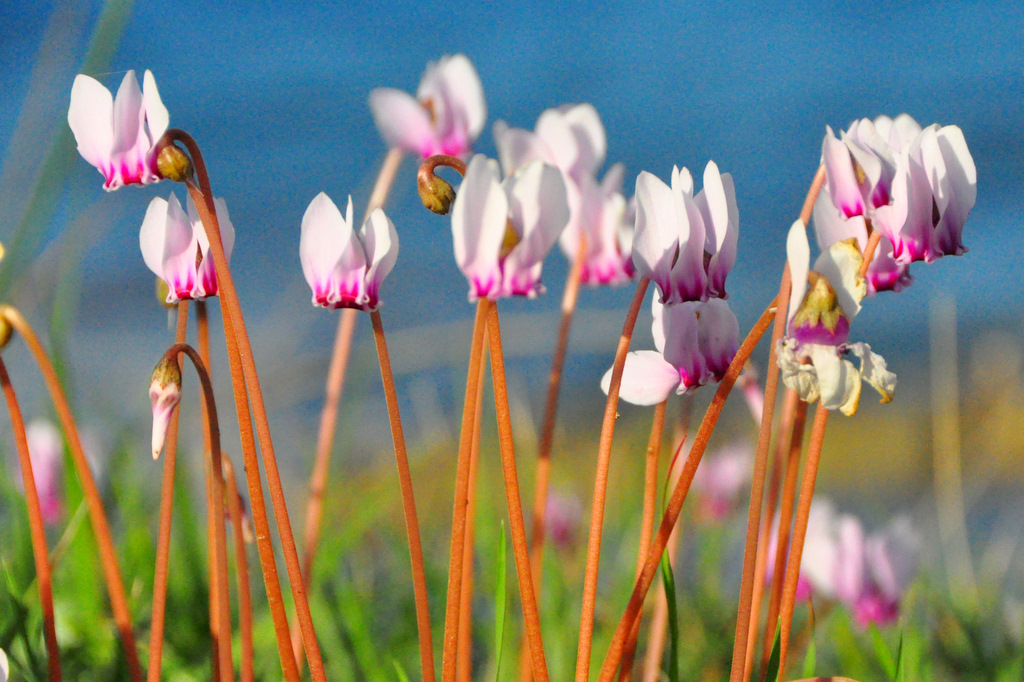
Short flowers with wide throats

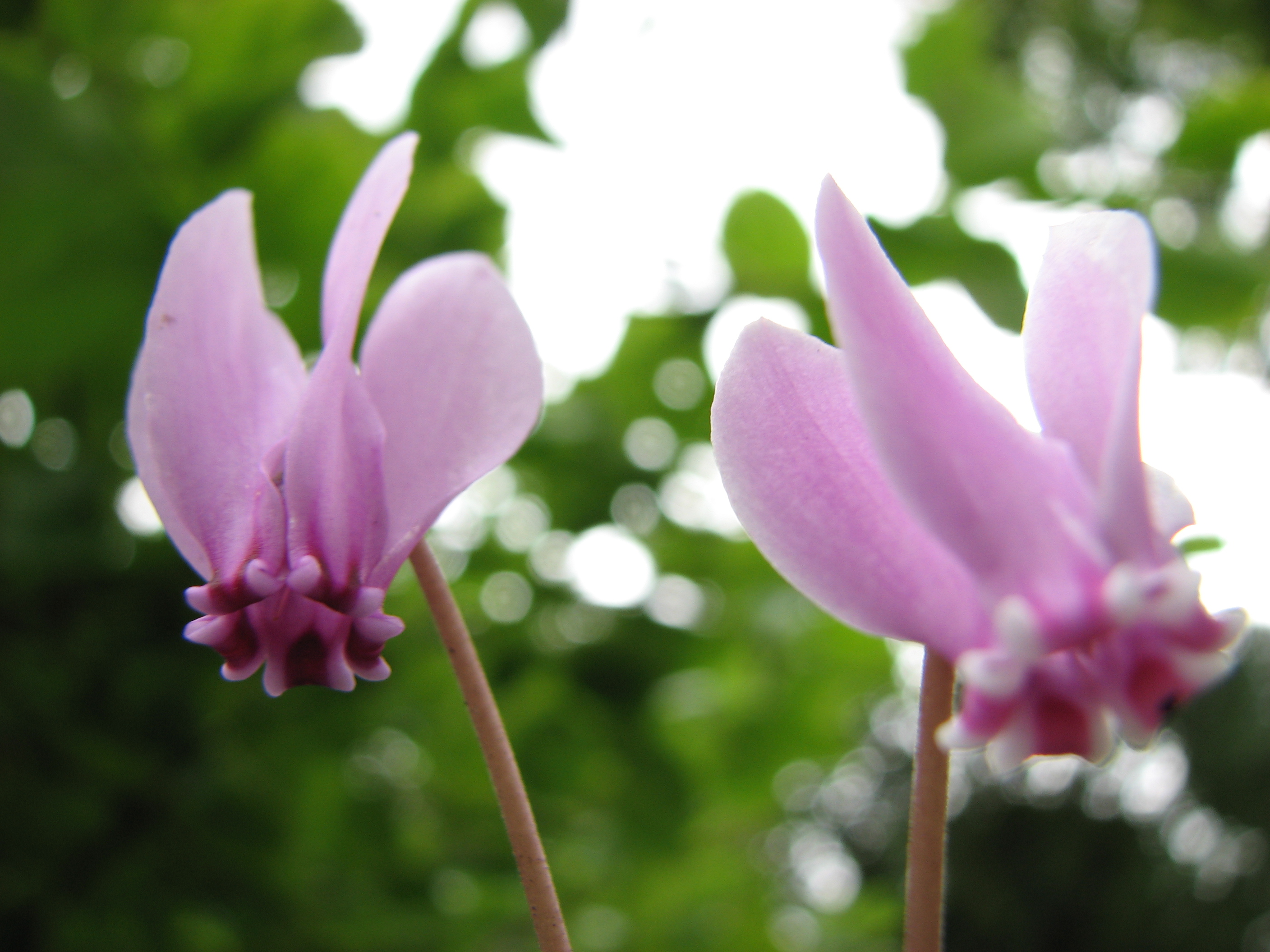
Underside of auricles

=== Fruit ===
After the flowers finish, the flower stem coils tightly, starting at the end, and rests above the tuber. The seeds are yellow-brown, held in a round pod, which opens by 5–10 flaps at maturity. The seeds are covered in a sweet sticky substance attractive to ants, which can disperse the seeds up to several hundred metres.

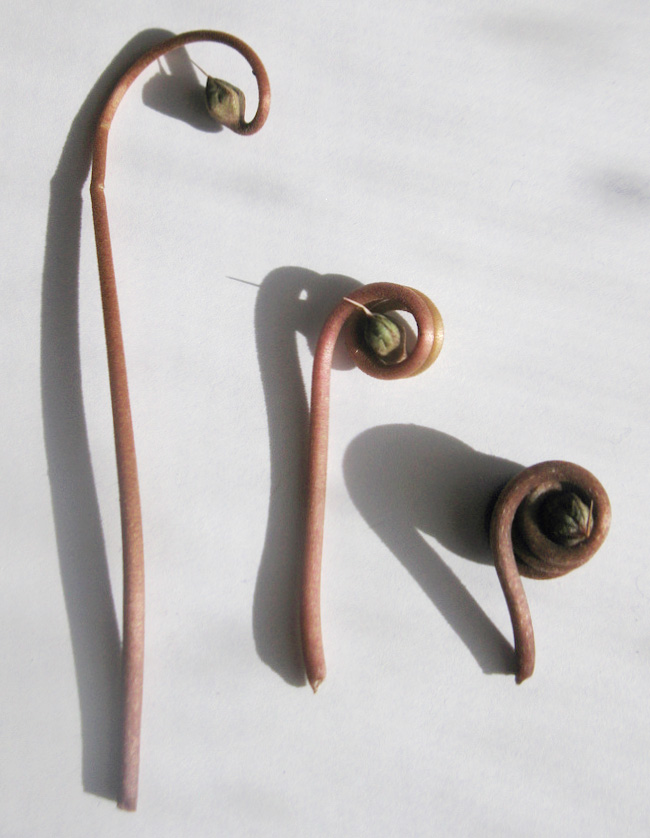
Coiling flower stalk

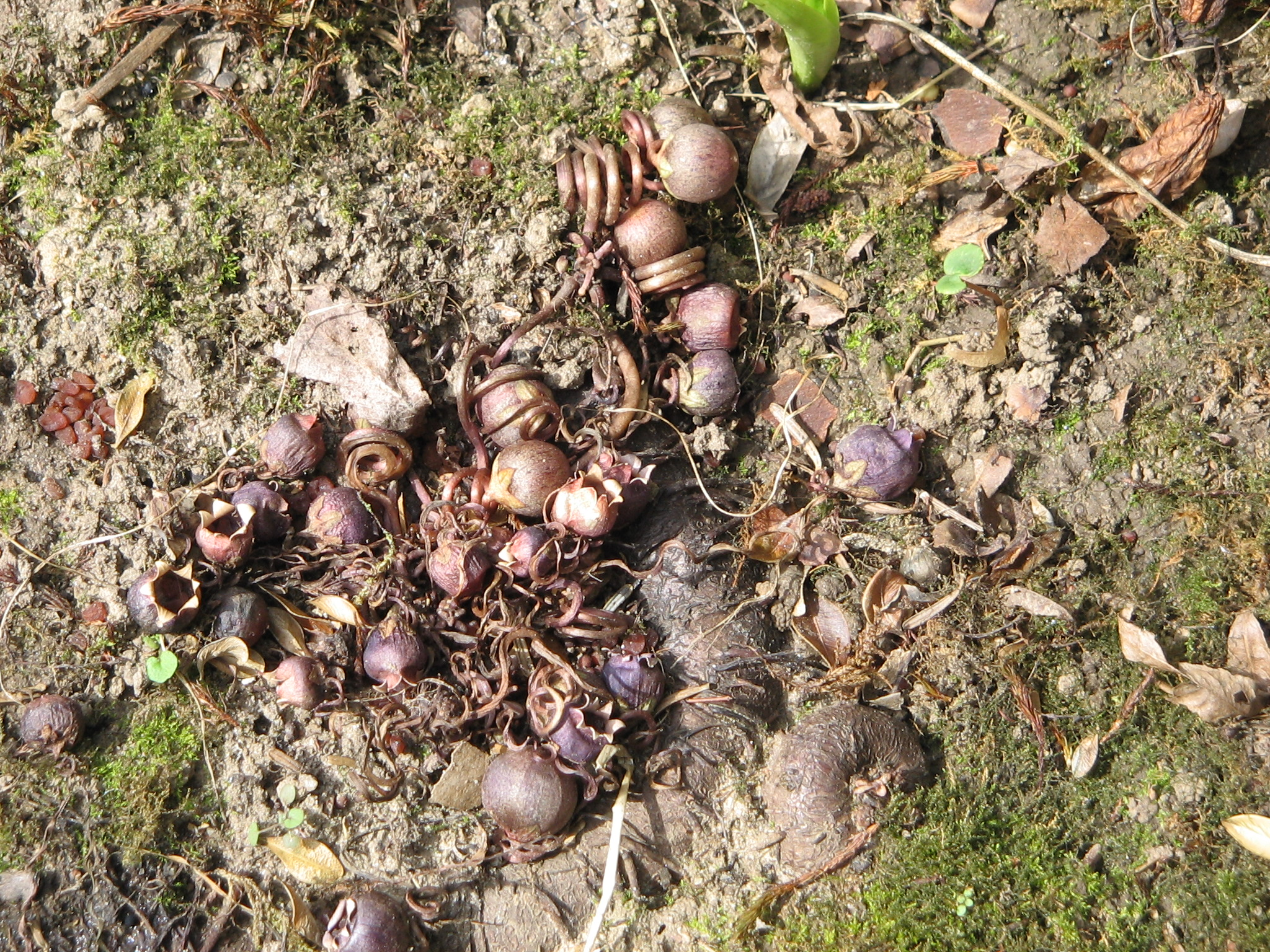
Pods and exposed tubers

== Cultivation ==
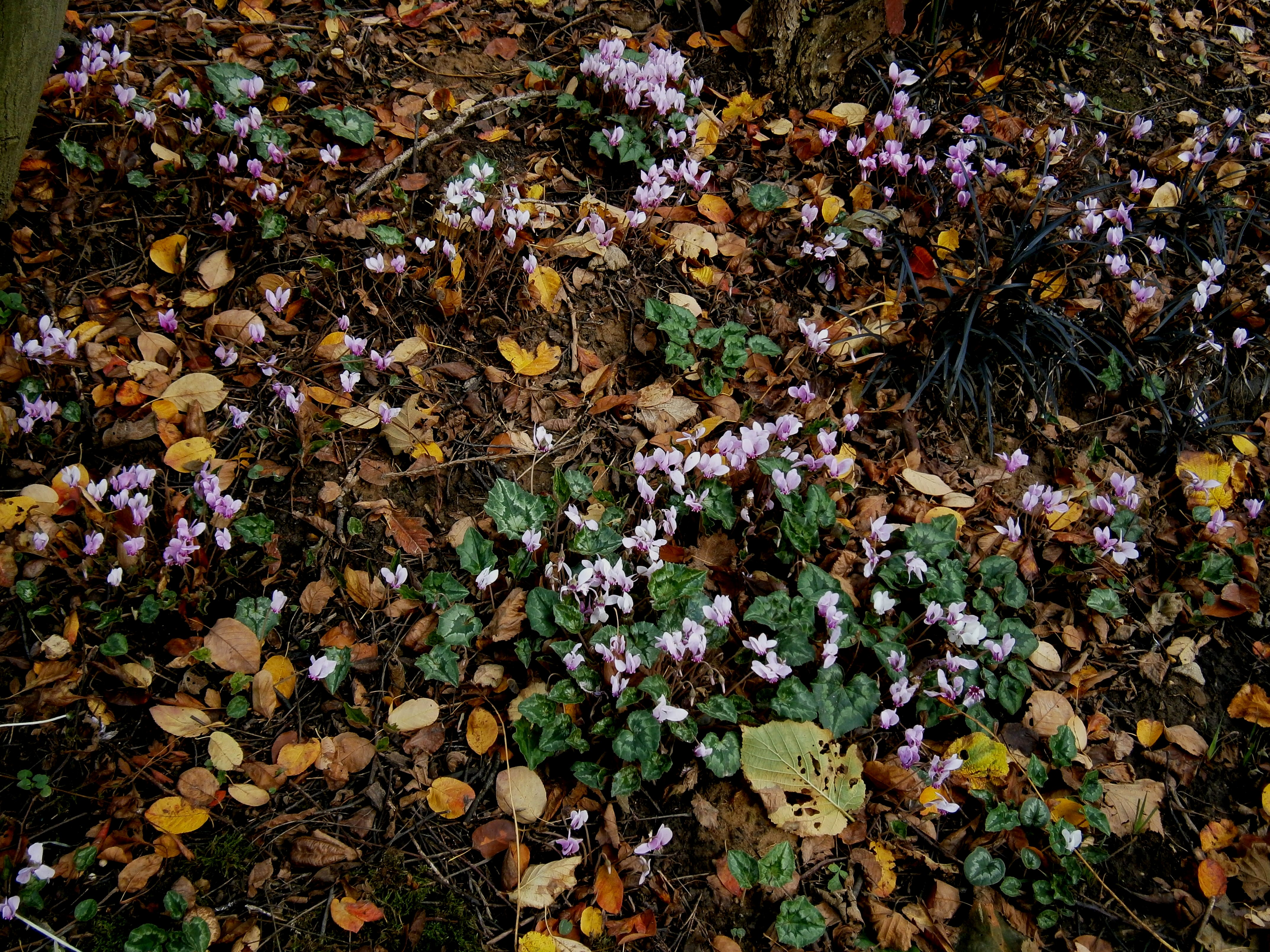
Cyclamen hederifolium naturalised in Belgium

Cyclamen hederifolium is usually listed as the hardiest species of cyclamen. In oceanic climates, it self-seeds abundantly and will crowd out less vigorous species such as Cyclamen coum if the two are planted together. In cold continental climates such as Calgary, Alberta, where Cyclamen purpurascens grows well, it may not survive. It is hardy to zone 6, tolerating temperatures down to -18°C, or lower (to -30°C) if protected by reliable snow cover.

This plant has gained the Royal Horticultural Society's Award of Garden Merit (confirmed 2017).

=== Cultivars and cultivar groups ===
C. h. subsp. hederifolium has sometimes been divided into two forms differentiated by leaf and flower characteristics, forma hederifolium with pink or purple flowers with darker markings at the base of the petals, and forma albiflorum with white flowers, sometimes with pale pink throat. These are however not considered botanically distinct by the Plants of the World Online (POWO) database, which treats f. albiflorum as a synonym. The white-flowered form has won the RHS AGM.

Another published varietal name Cyclamen hederifolium var. poli, with long sagittate (arrowhead-shaped) leaves, is listed by the Pacific Bulb Society, but is also treated as a synonym of the type by POWO.

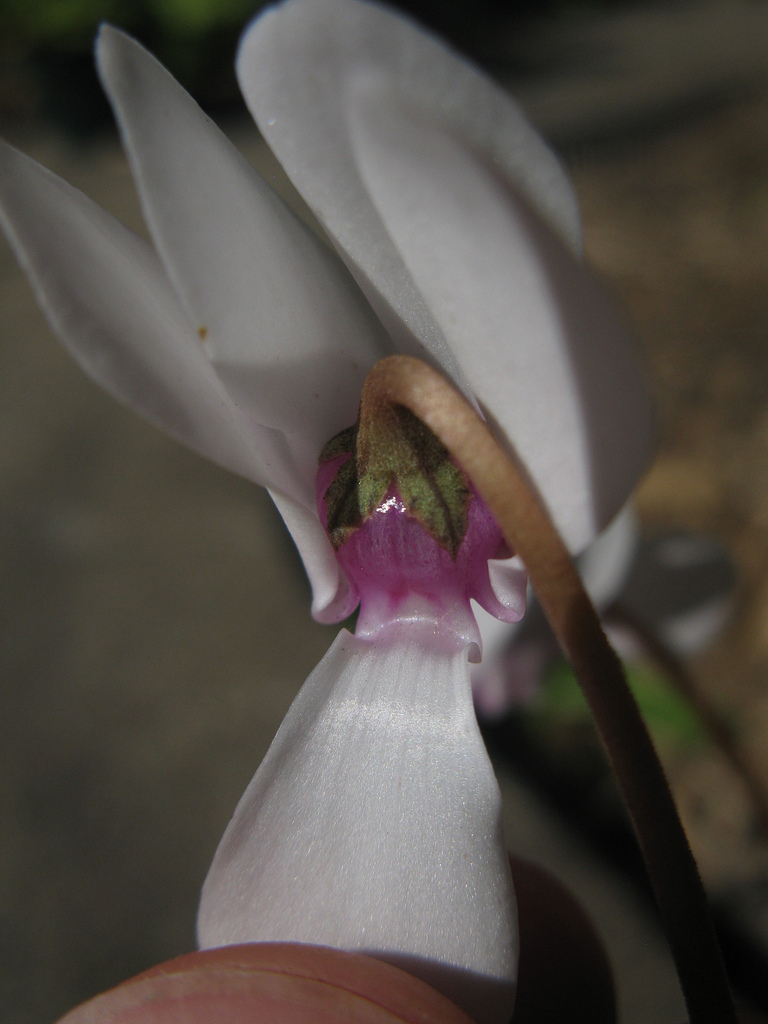
Pink throat of a white cultivar

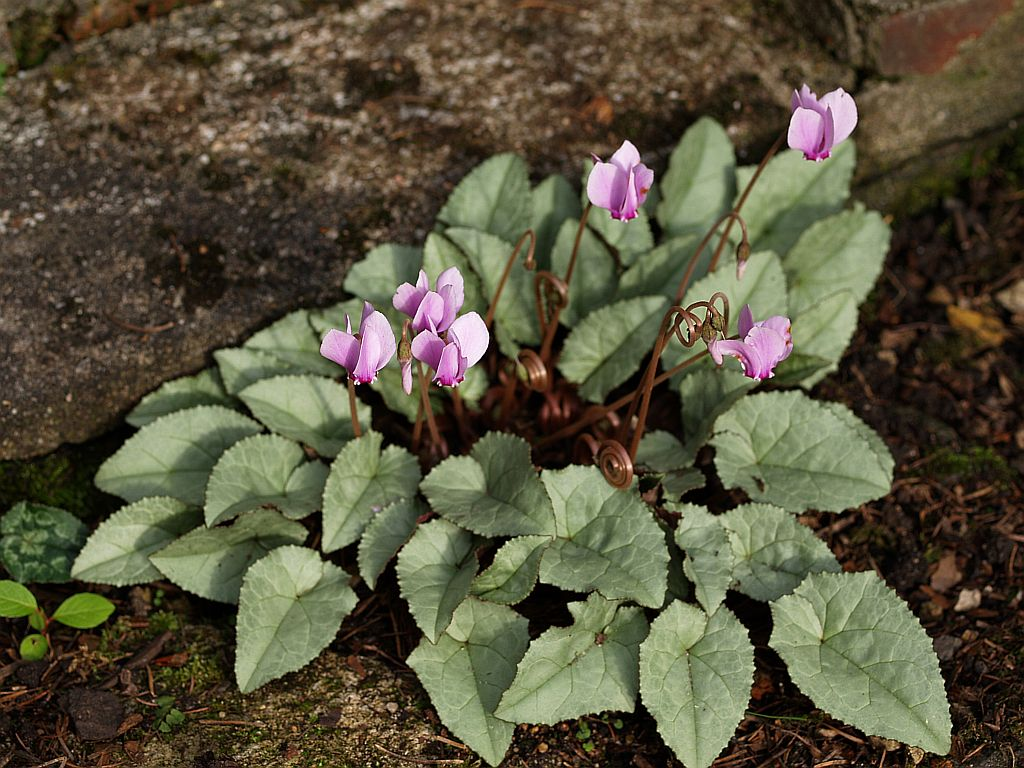
A cultivar with fully silvered leaves

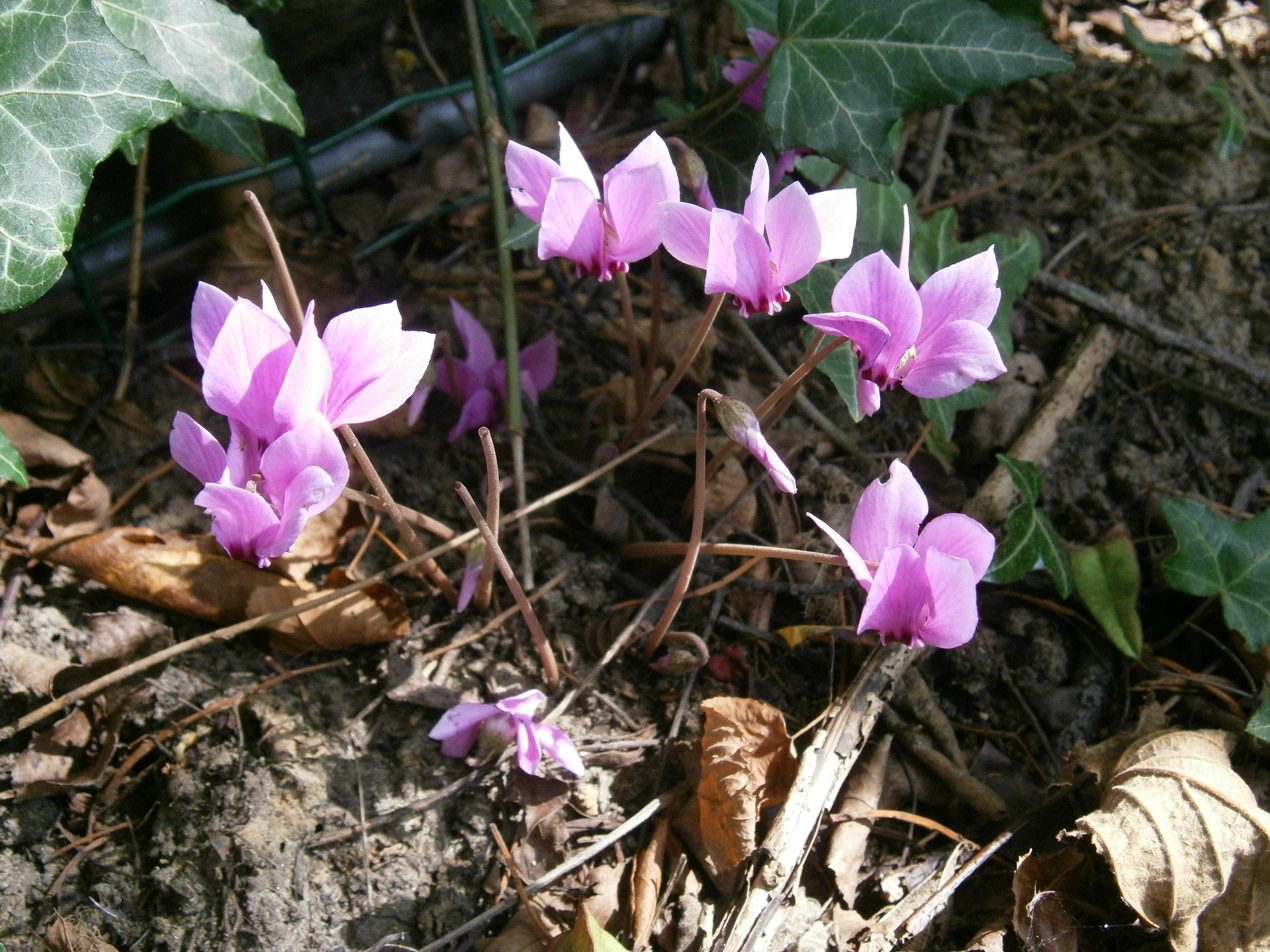
Plant of 'Amaze Me' with purple flowers

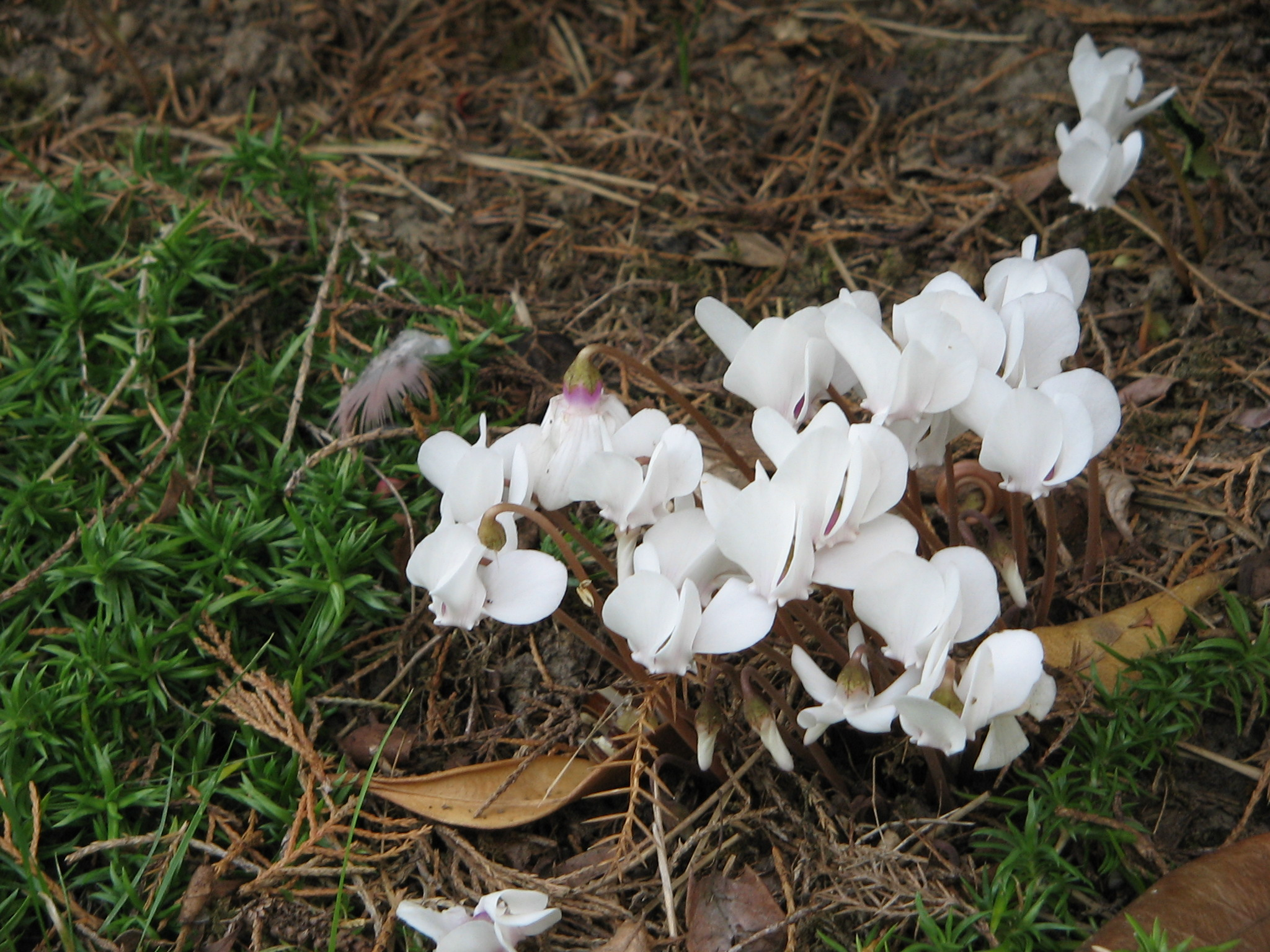
Plant with all-white flowers

Selected cultivars of Cyclamen hederifolium include:

- Cyclamen hederifolium 'Amaze Me', a cultivar with dark pink flowers, is early blooming.
- Cyclamen hederifolium 'Ruby Glow' has particularly deep all-magenta flowers.
- Cyclamen hederifolium 'Stargazer' has upward-facing flowers.
