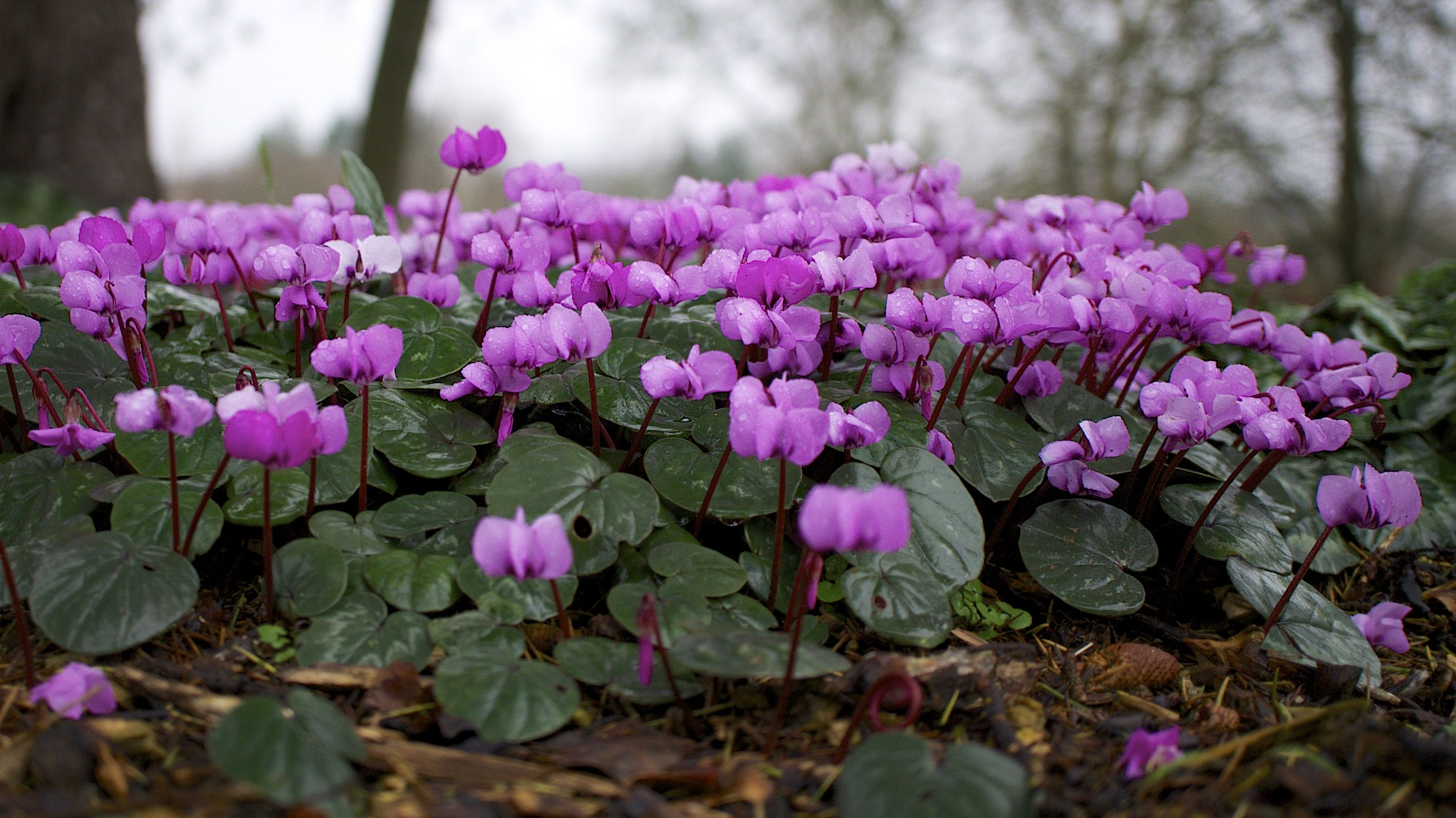
- A form with plain leaves

Scientific classification
- Kingdom: Plantae
- Clade: Tracheophytes
- Clade: Angiosperms
- Clade: Eudicots
- Clade: Asterids
- Order: Ericales
- Family: Primulaceae
- Genus: Cyclamen
- Subgenus: C. subg. Gyrophoebe
- Species: C. coum

Binomial name
- Cyclamen coum Mill.

= Cyclamen coum =

Species of flowering plant in the primrose family

Cyclamen coum, the eastern sowbread, is a species of flowering plant in the family Primulaceae. It is a tuberous herbaceous perennial, growing to 5–8 cm (2–3 in), with rounded heart-shaped leaves and pink shell-shaped flowers with darker coloration at the base. It is valued in horticulture as groundcover, and for the flowers which bloom in winter and early spring.

== Description ==
The tuber produces roots from the center of the bottom only. It remains small, only reaching about 6.5 cm (2.6 in) across.

The leaves are round or kidney-shaped to long heart-shaped. The color is all-silver, all-green, or silver variegated with a variably sized green hastate (arrowhead-shaped) or "Christmas tree" pattern and a green edge. The edge is smooth or gently toothed, but never angled and pointed as in Cyclamen hederifolium.

The flowers are squat, with almost round petals, unlike any other group of cyclamen species. They bloom from winter to spring. The petals are magenta, pink, or white, with a darker blotch at the base. Below the blotch is a small white or pink "eye".

== Etymology ==
The species name coum more likely refers to Koa or Quwê (an ancient region in eastern Cilicia, southeastern Turkey), which is part of the species' natural range, than to the island of Kos, where the species does not grow.

== Distribution ==
Cyclamen coum is native to two areas. The main range is around the Black Sea, from Bulgaria through northern Turkey to the Caucasus and Crimea, and a disjunct population lies near the Mediterranean from the Hatay Province in Turkey through Lebanon to northern Israel.

Cyclamen coum subsp. coum inhabits the western part of the main range and the southern area, while C. coum subsp. caucasicum inhabits the eastern part, including the Caucasus. Plants with intermediate characteristics are found in the middle of the range.

== Cultivation ==
Cyclamen coum self-seeds and grows more slowly than Cyclamen hederifolium and is usually out-competed when the two are grown together. The species C. coum and the form C. coum subsp. coum f. coum Pewter Group have gained the Royal Horticultural Society's Award of Garden Merit (confirmed 2017).

=== Hardiness ===
Along with C. hederifolium and C. purpurascens, C. coum is one of the hardiest cyclamen species, growing well in an area of New York where the temperature has reached as low as −19 °F (−28 °C).

== Subspecies and forms ==
There are two subspecies and three forms, distinguished by leaf and flower characteristics. Cyclamen elegans was formerly considered a subspecies (Cyclamen coum subsp. elegans), but is now a species in its own right.

- leaf as wide or broader than long
  - Cyclamen coum subsp. coum (west and south) — leaf edge usually smooth, petal lobes 0.8–1.4 cm (0.3–0.6 in)
    - Cyclamen coum subsp. coum f. coum — petals pink to magenta, with dark markings at base of petal lobe
    - Cyclamen coum subsp. coum f. pallidum — petals white or very pale pink, with dark markings
    - Cyclamen coum subsp. coum f. albissimum — petals pure white, without markings
- leaf longer than wide
  - Cyclamen coum subsp. caucasicum (east) — leaf wavy-edged — petals 1.2–2 cm (0.5–0.8 in)

Note: The isolate population of Crimea, formerly called Cyclamen kuznetzovii Kotov & Czernova, is now considered as a local variant of Cyclamen coum.

== Gallery ==
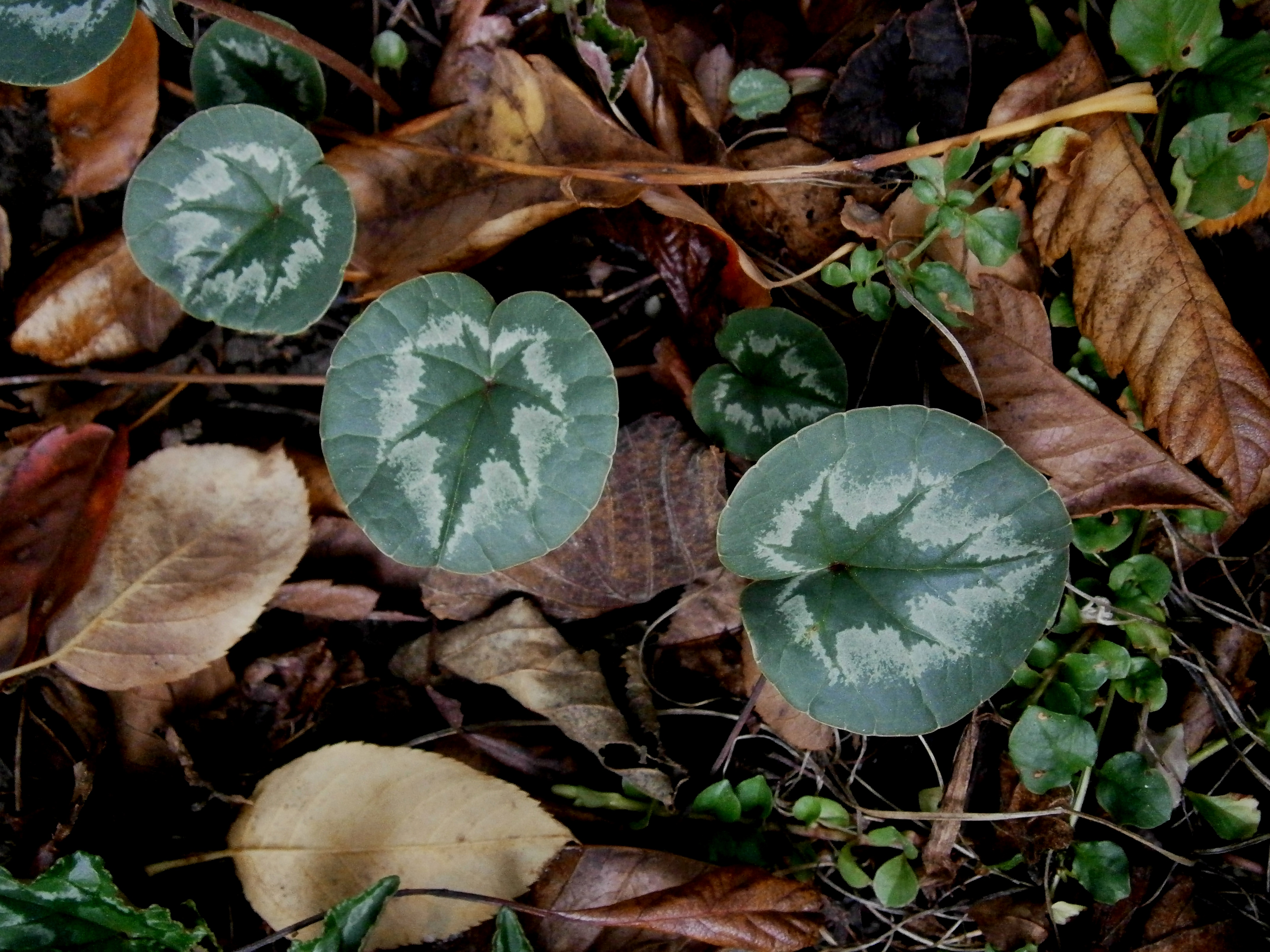
Leaf in autumn

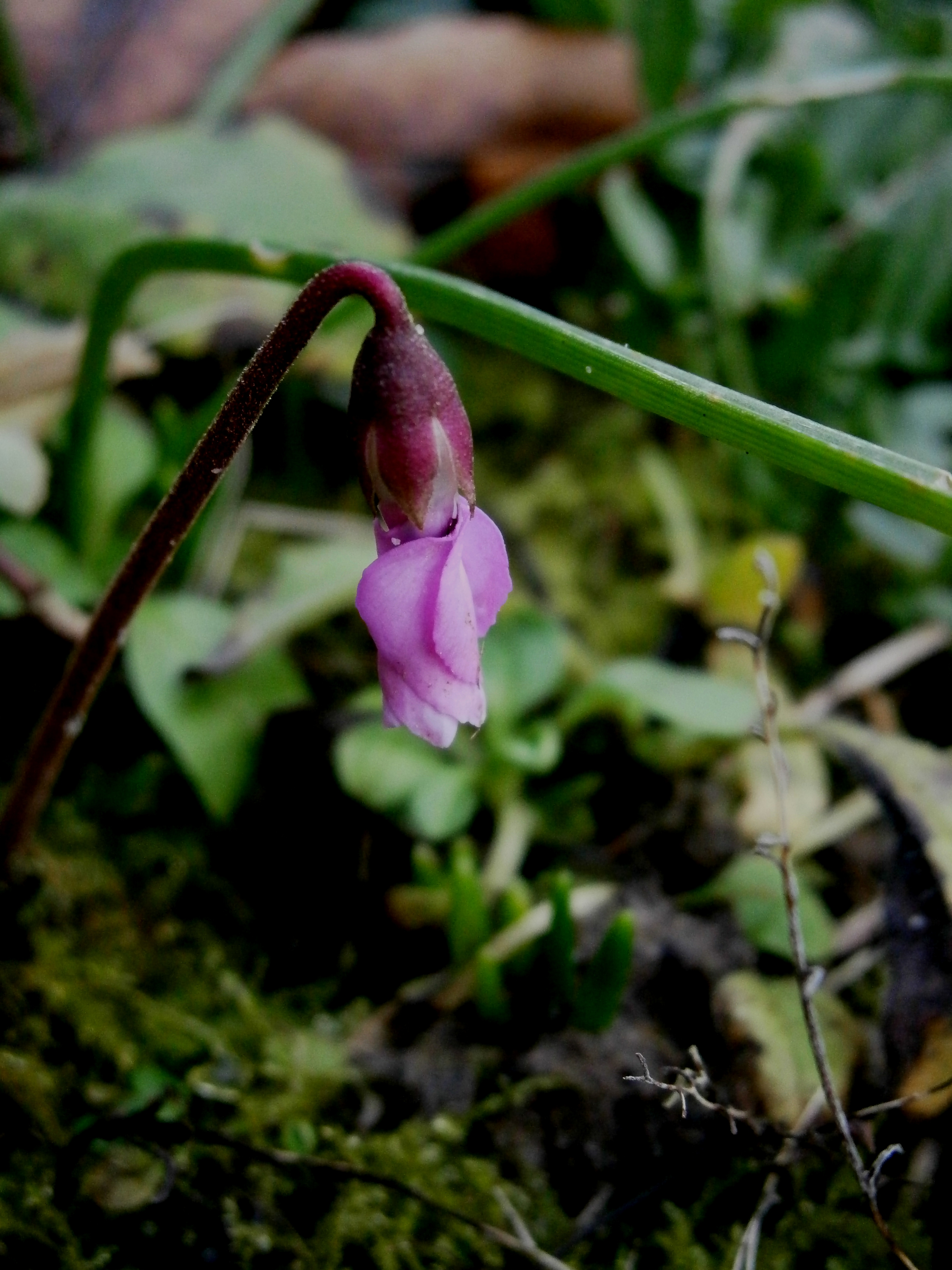
Opening flower bud

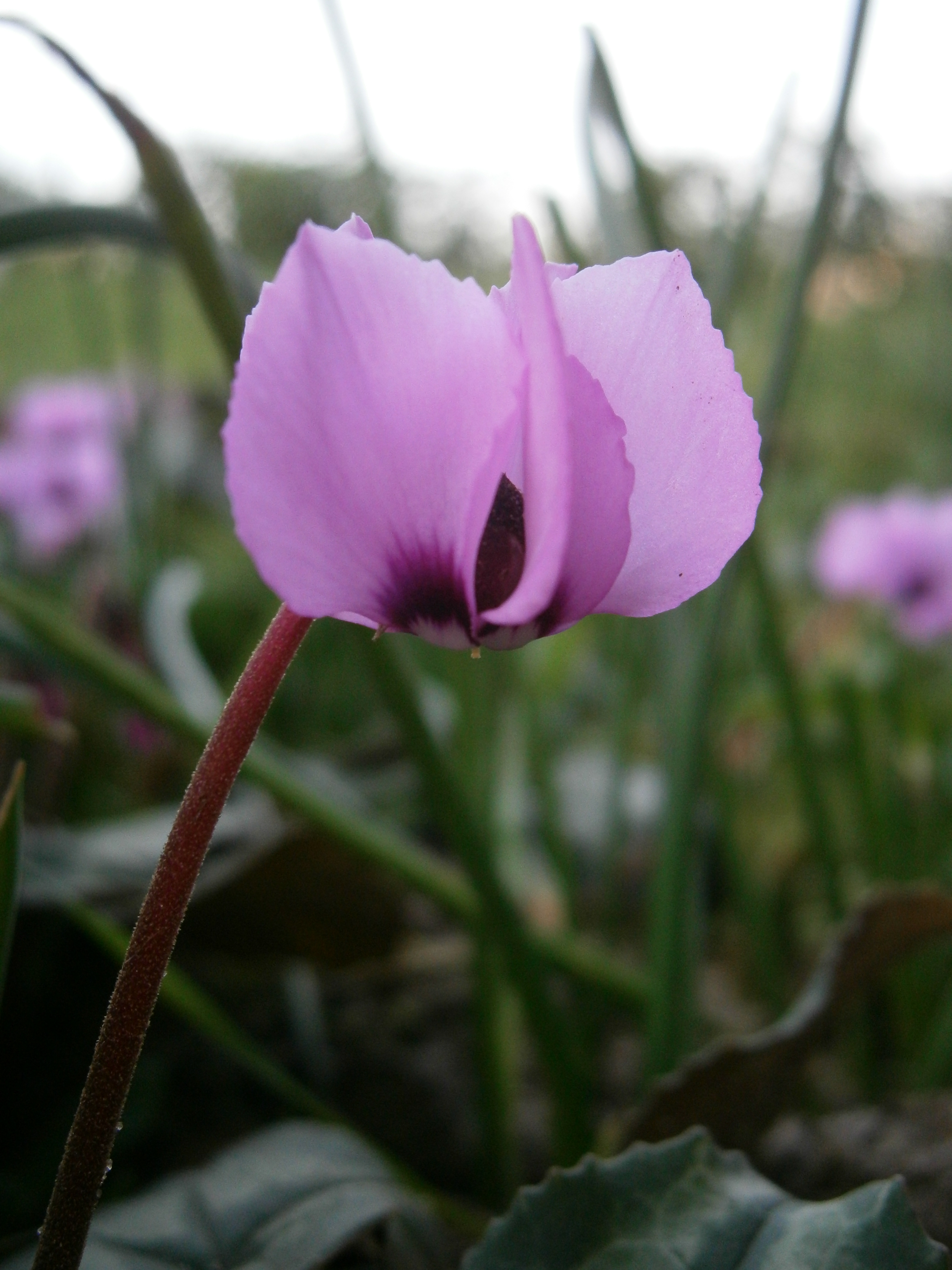
Light pink flower

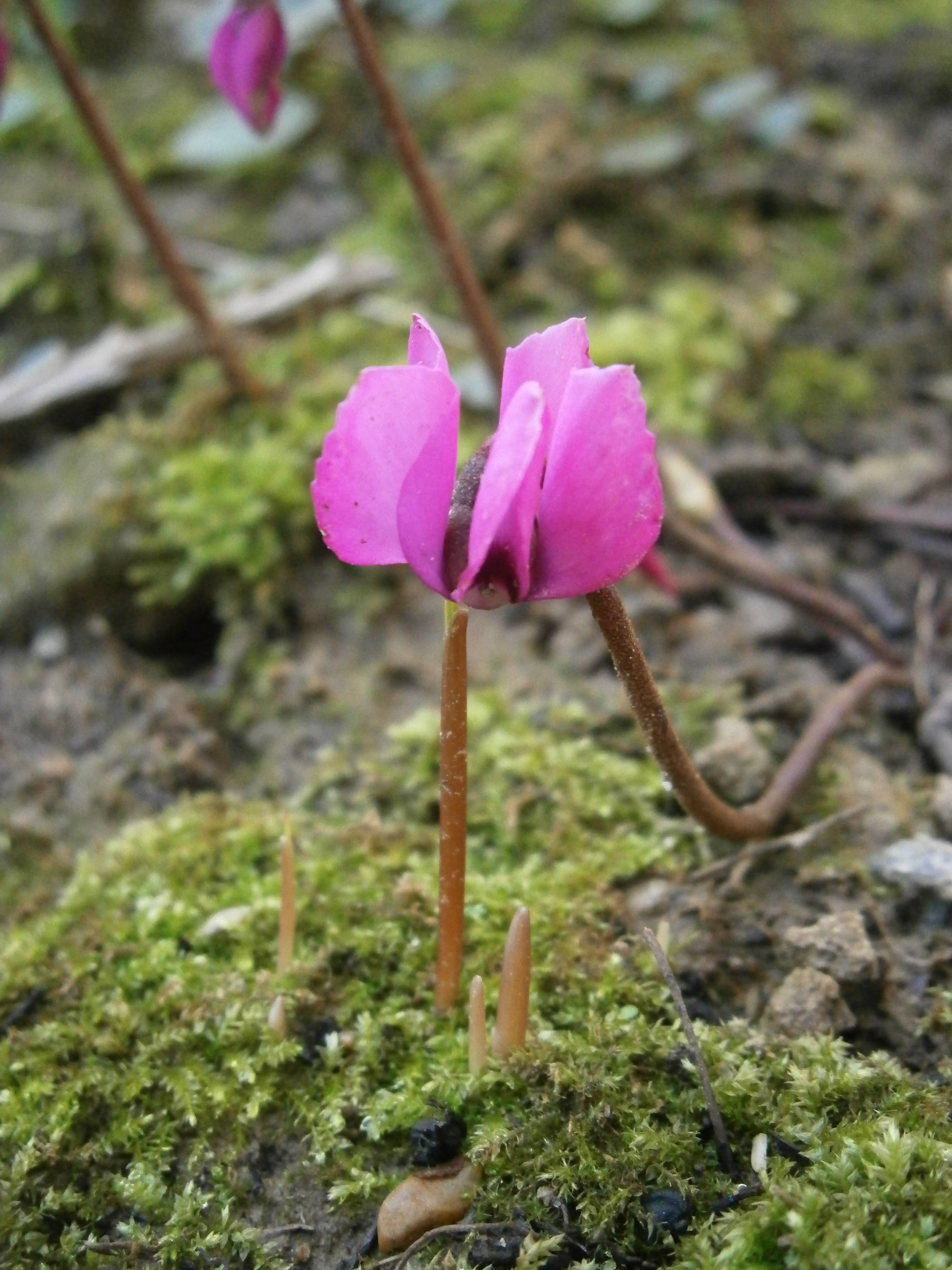
Dark pink flower

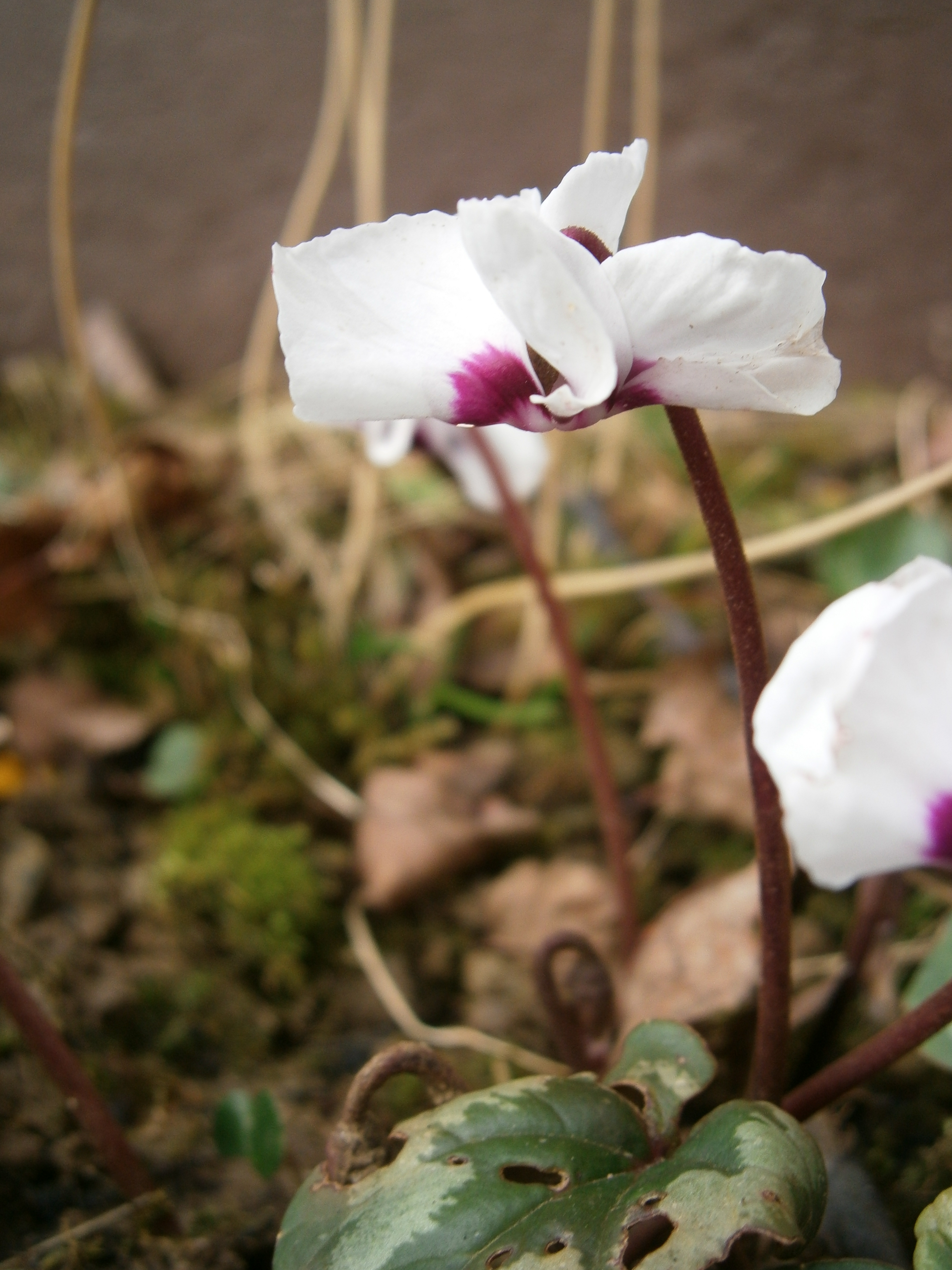
White flower (f. pallidum)

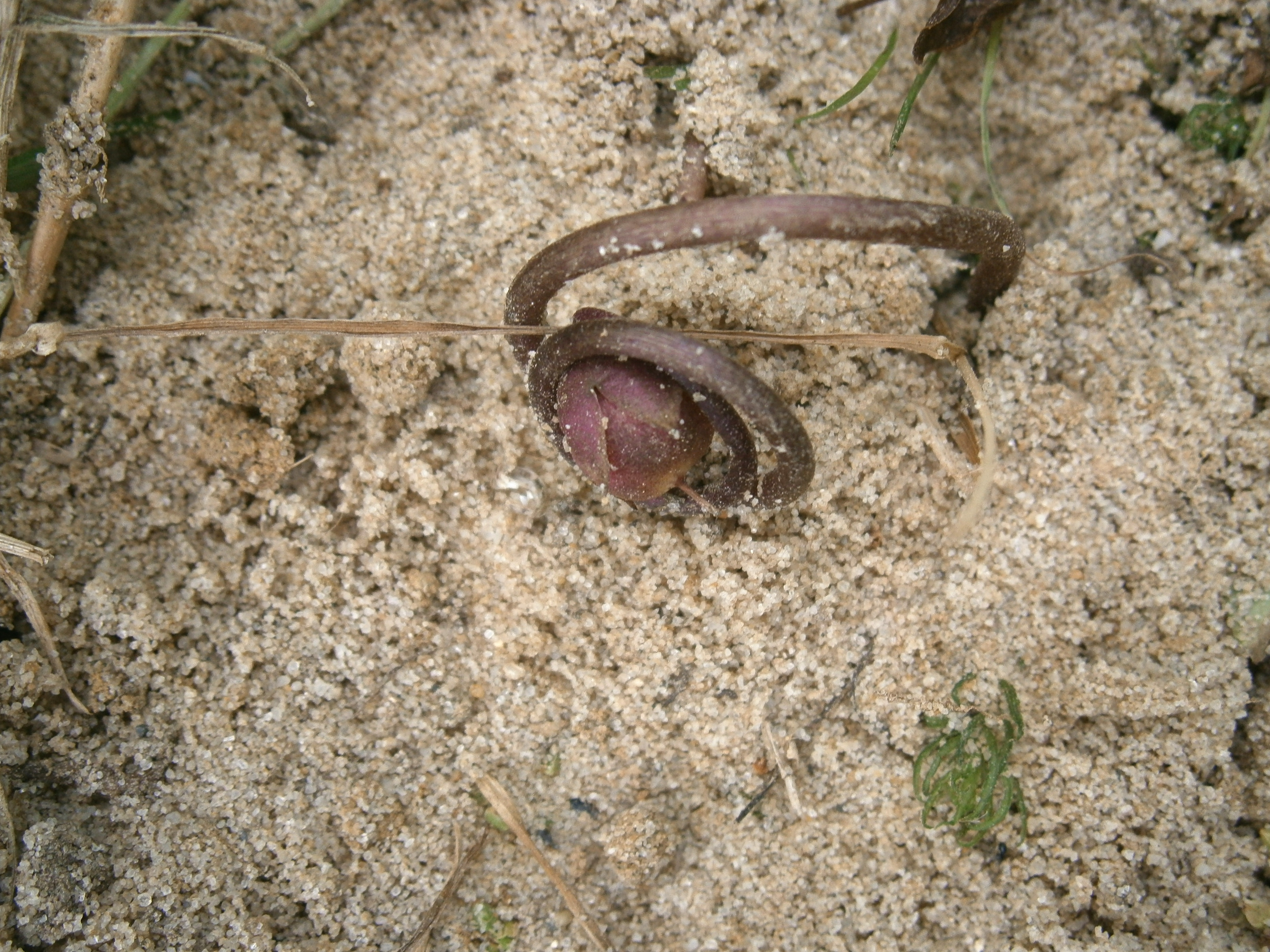
Ripening seed pod

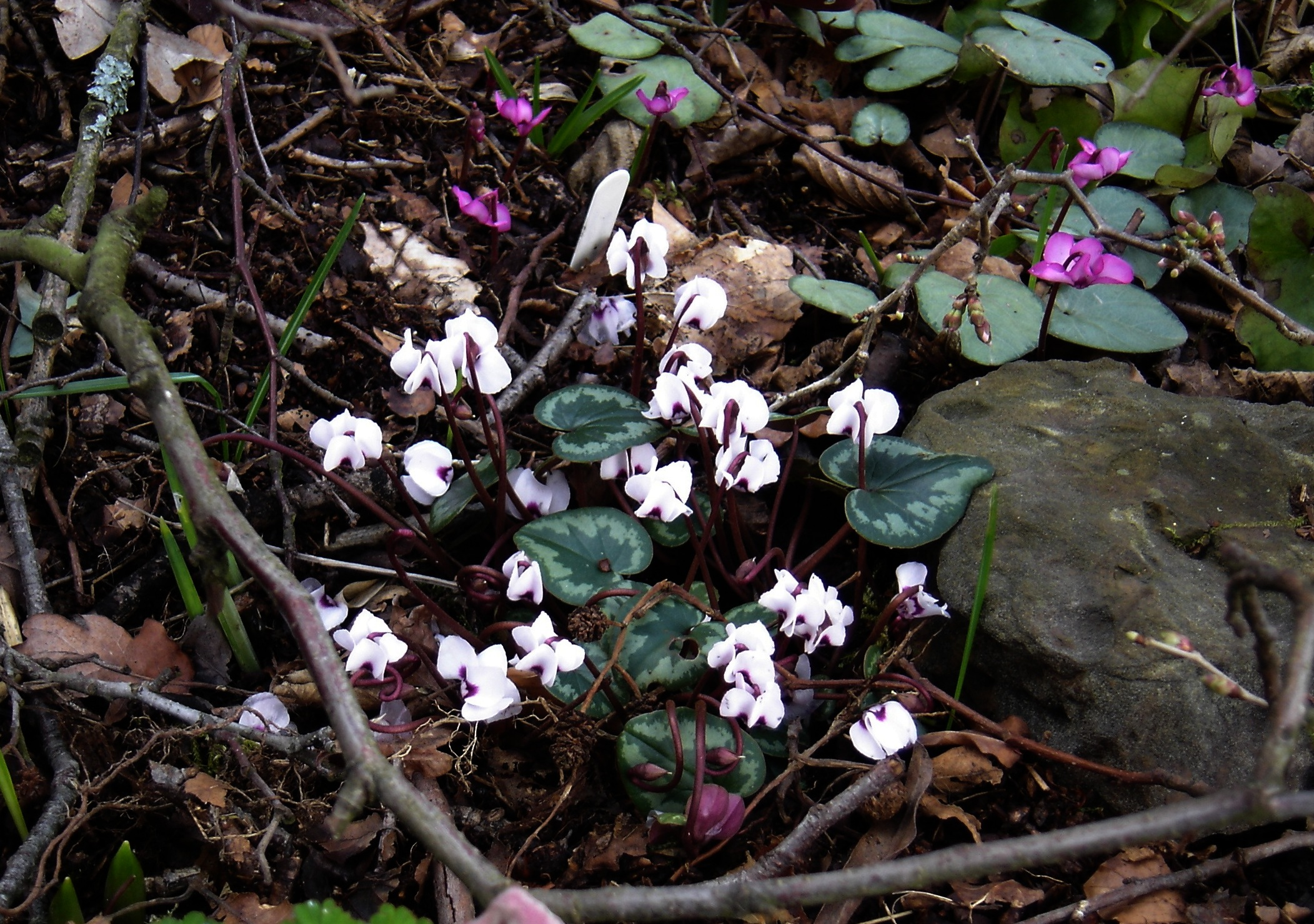
Cyclamen coum subsp. coum f. pallidum (white flowers with dark markings)

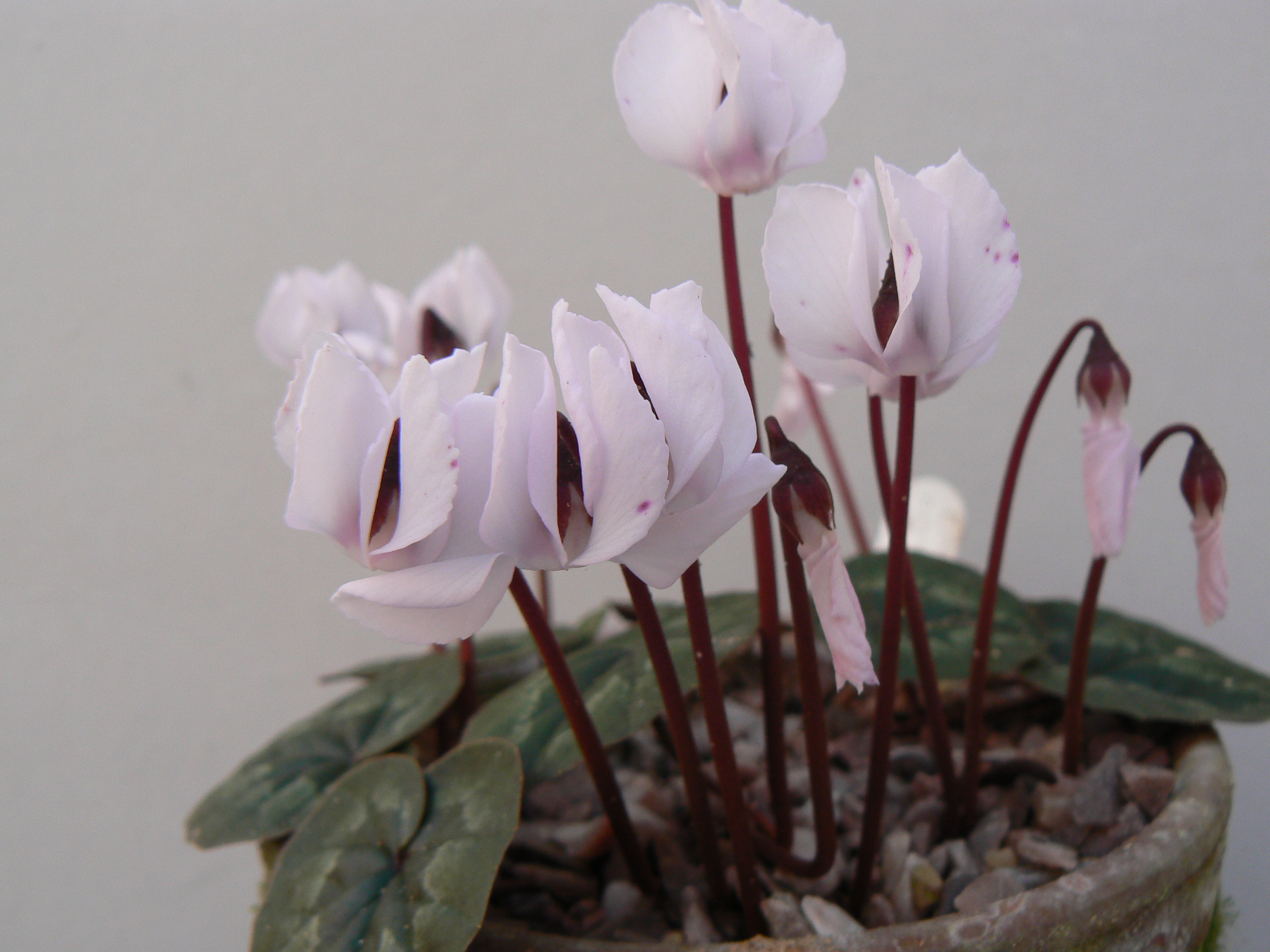
Cyclamen coum subsp. coum f. albissimum 'Lake Effect' (white flowers with no dark markings)

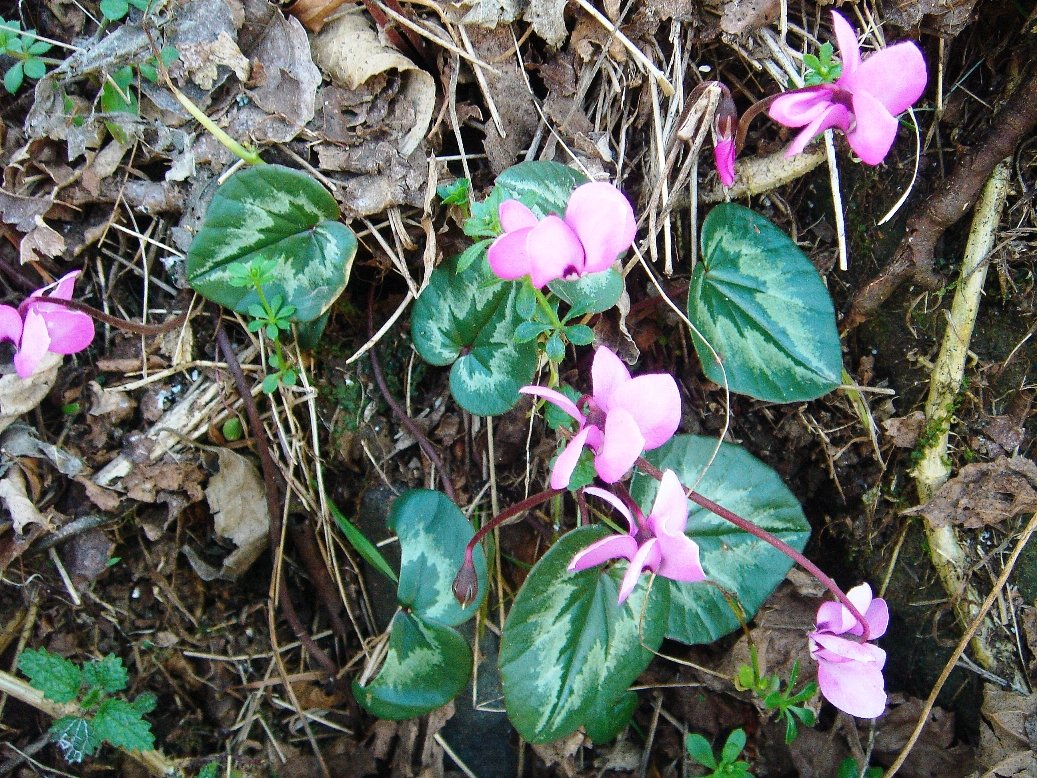
Cyclamen coum subsp. caucasicum

== Similar species ==
The Cyclamen coum group also includes Cyclamen abchasicum, Cyclamen elegans, Cyclamen alpinum, Cyclamen parviflorum and Cyclamen pseudibericum.

- leaves wider than long
  - Cyclamen parviflorum
    flowers tiny; leaves green
- leaves longer than wide; leaf edge coarsely toothed, scalloped, or shallowly lobed
  - petals as long as Cyclamen coum
    - Cyclamen alpinum (formerly Cyclamen trochopteranthum)
    petals horizontal, twisted like a propeller; leaves speckled with grey
  - petals longer than Cyclamen coum
    - Cyclamen abchasicum (formerly Cyclamen coum var. abchasicum)
    taxon between Cyclamen coum and Cyclamen elegans
    - Cyclamen elegans (formerly Cyclamen coum subsp. elegans)
    - Cyclamen pseudibericum
    petals with broad dark blotch and white band on nose
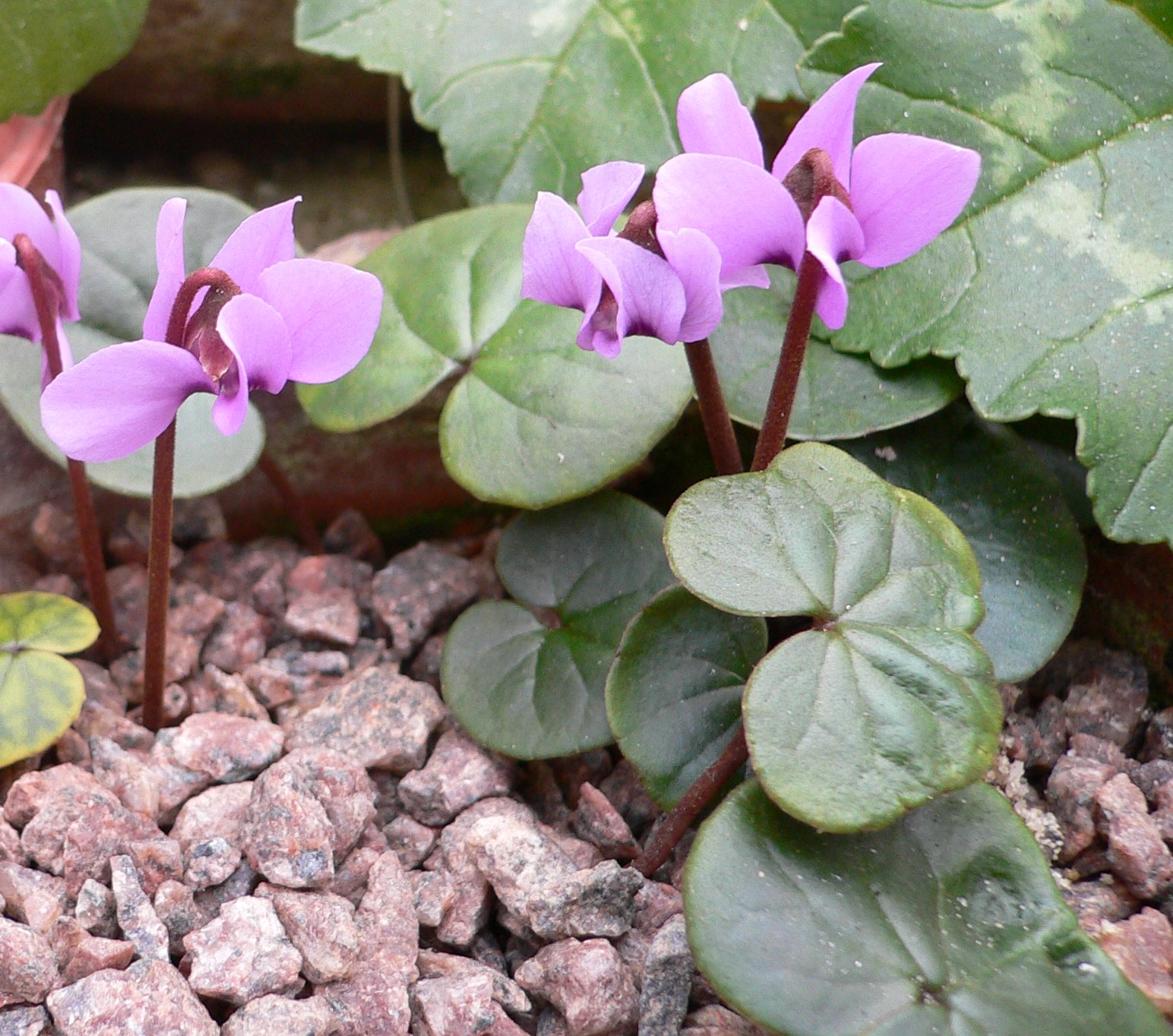
Cyclamen parviflorum var. subalpinum

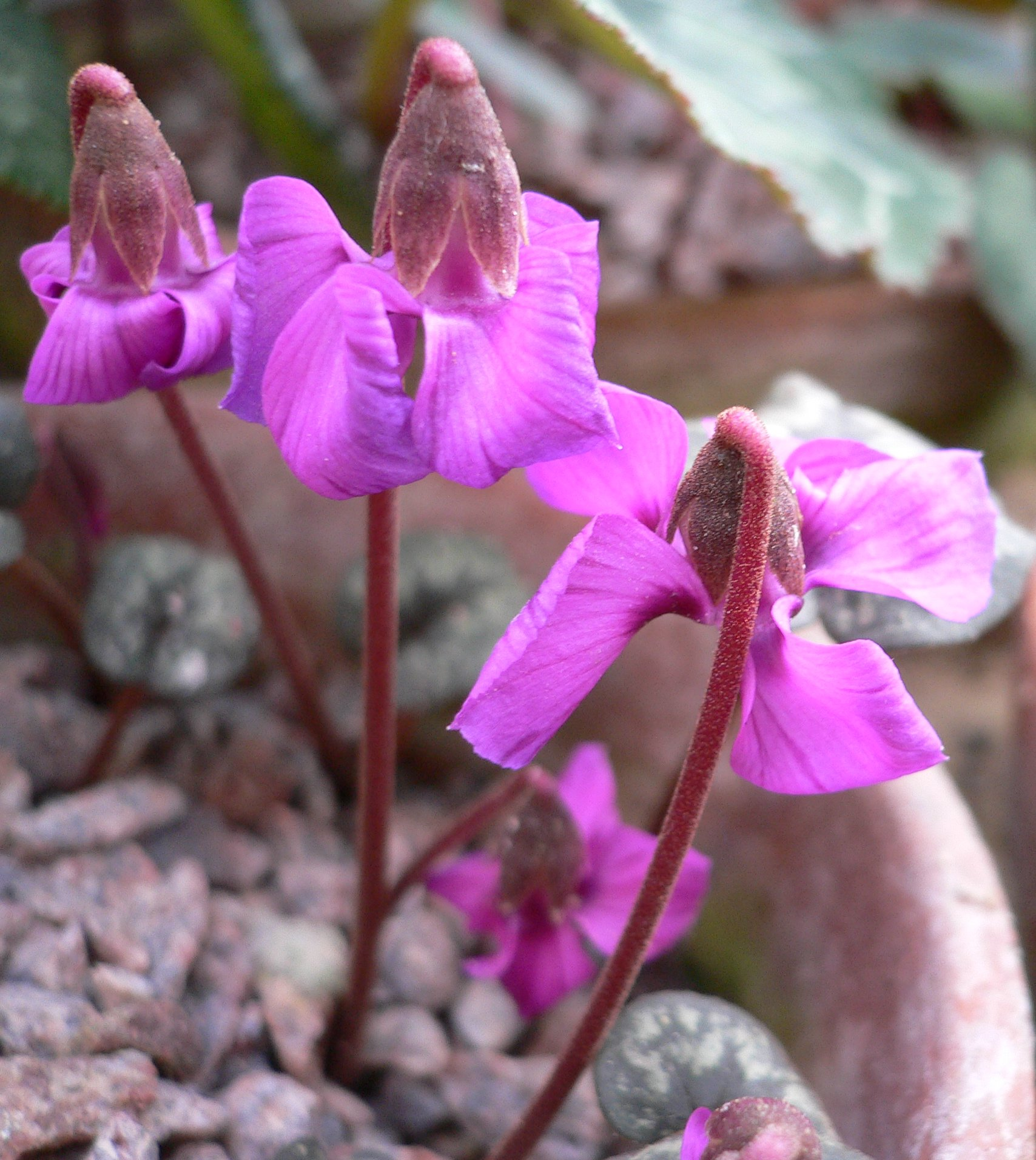
Cyclamen alpinum

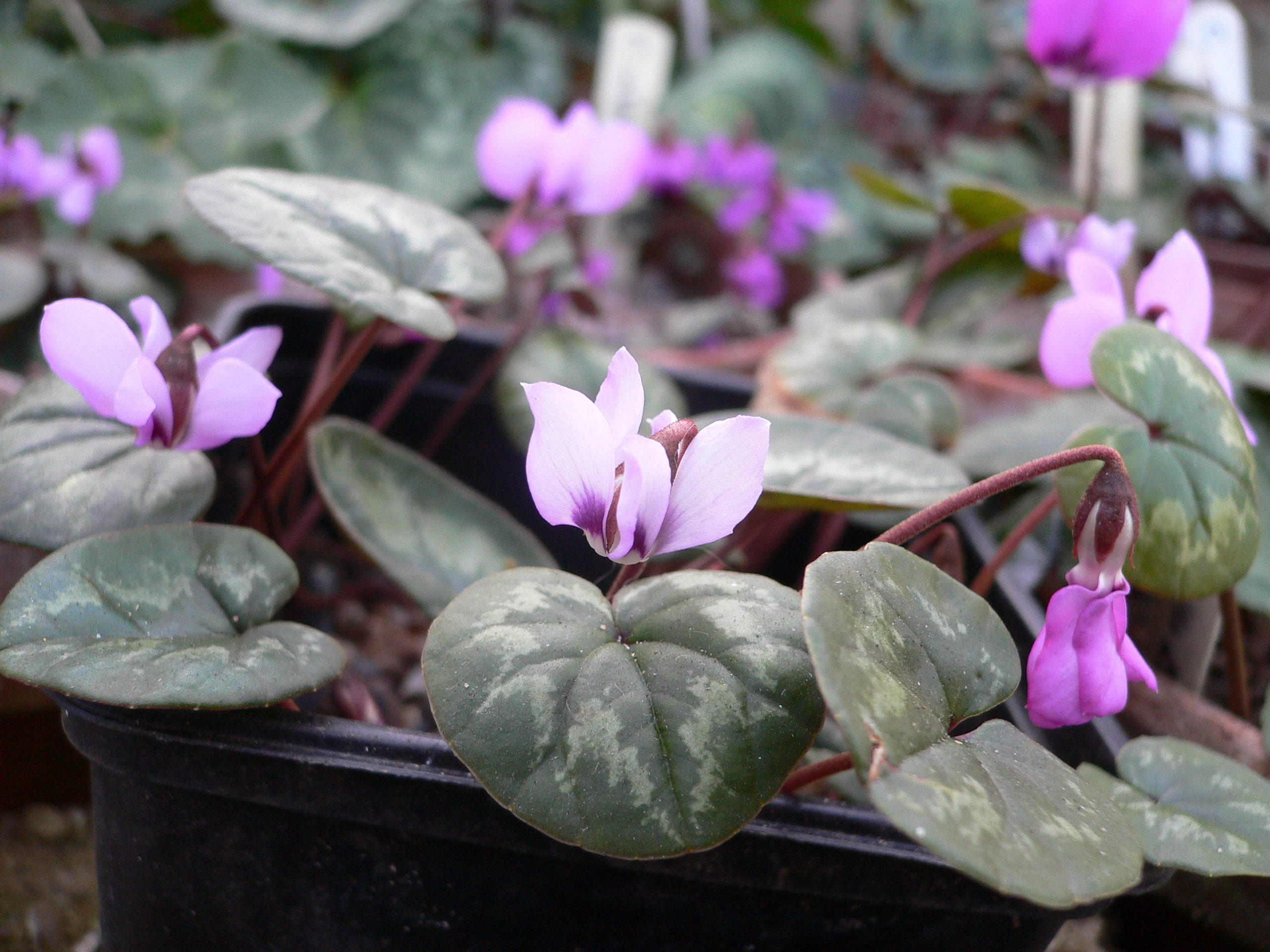
Cyclamen abchasicum

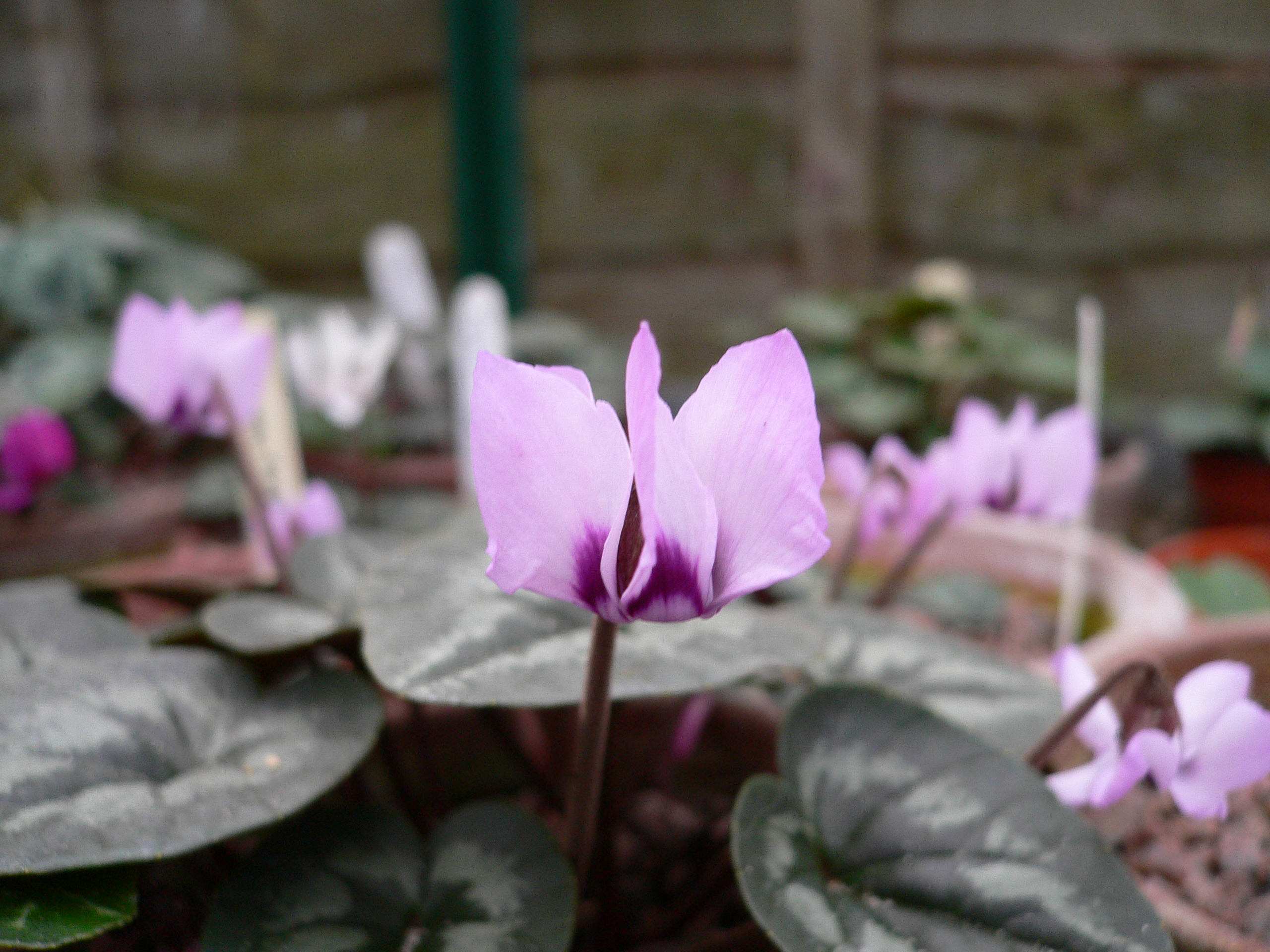
Cyclamen elegans

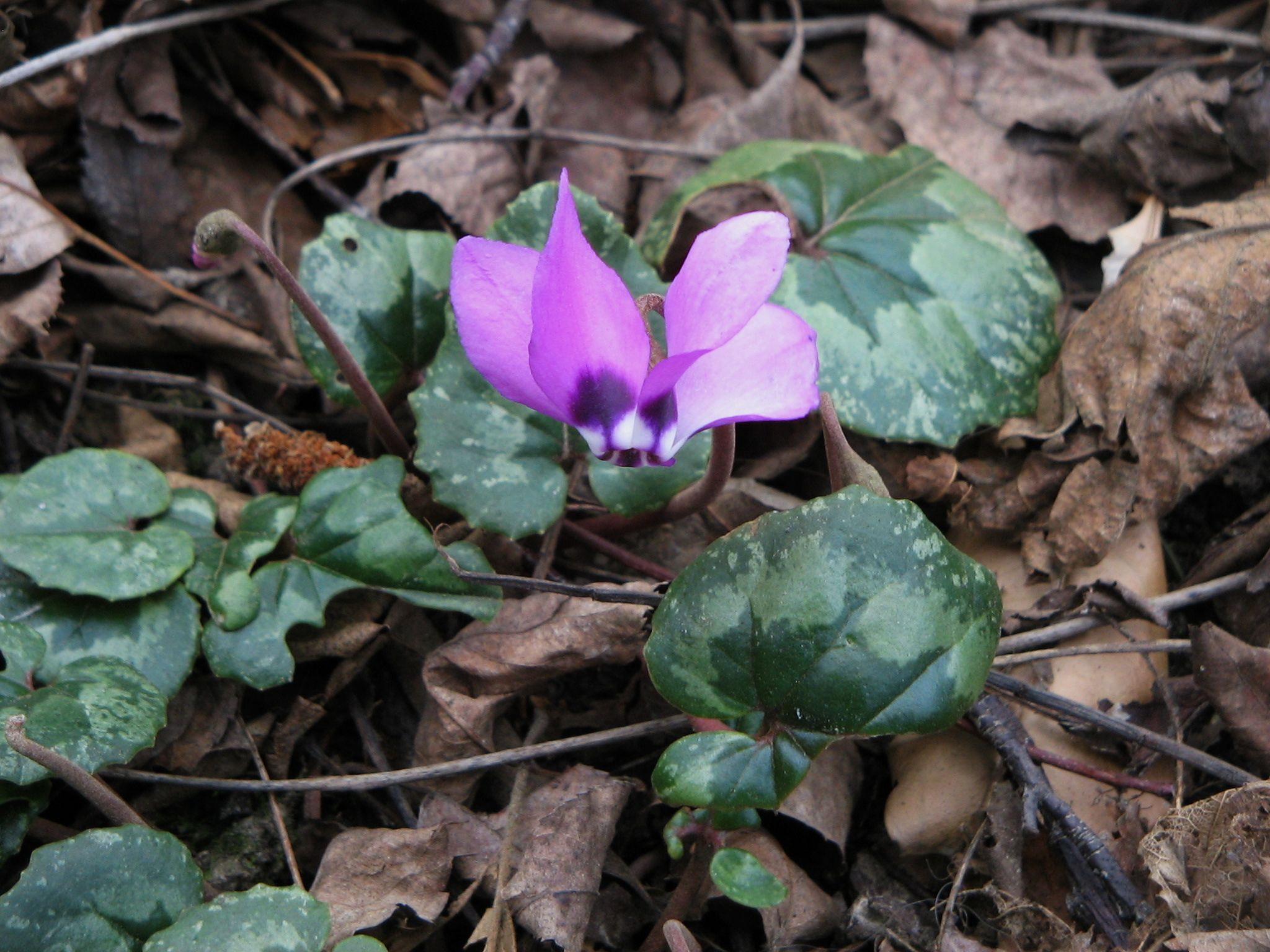
Cyclamen pseudibericum

== Hybrid ==
Cyclamen ×drydenii Grey-Wilson, a hybrid Cyclamen coum × Cyclamen alpinum, has intermediate characteristics, i.e., round leaves and horizontal twisted petals.
