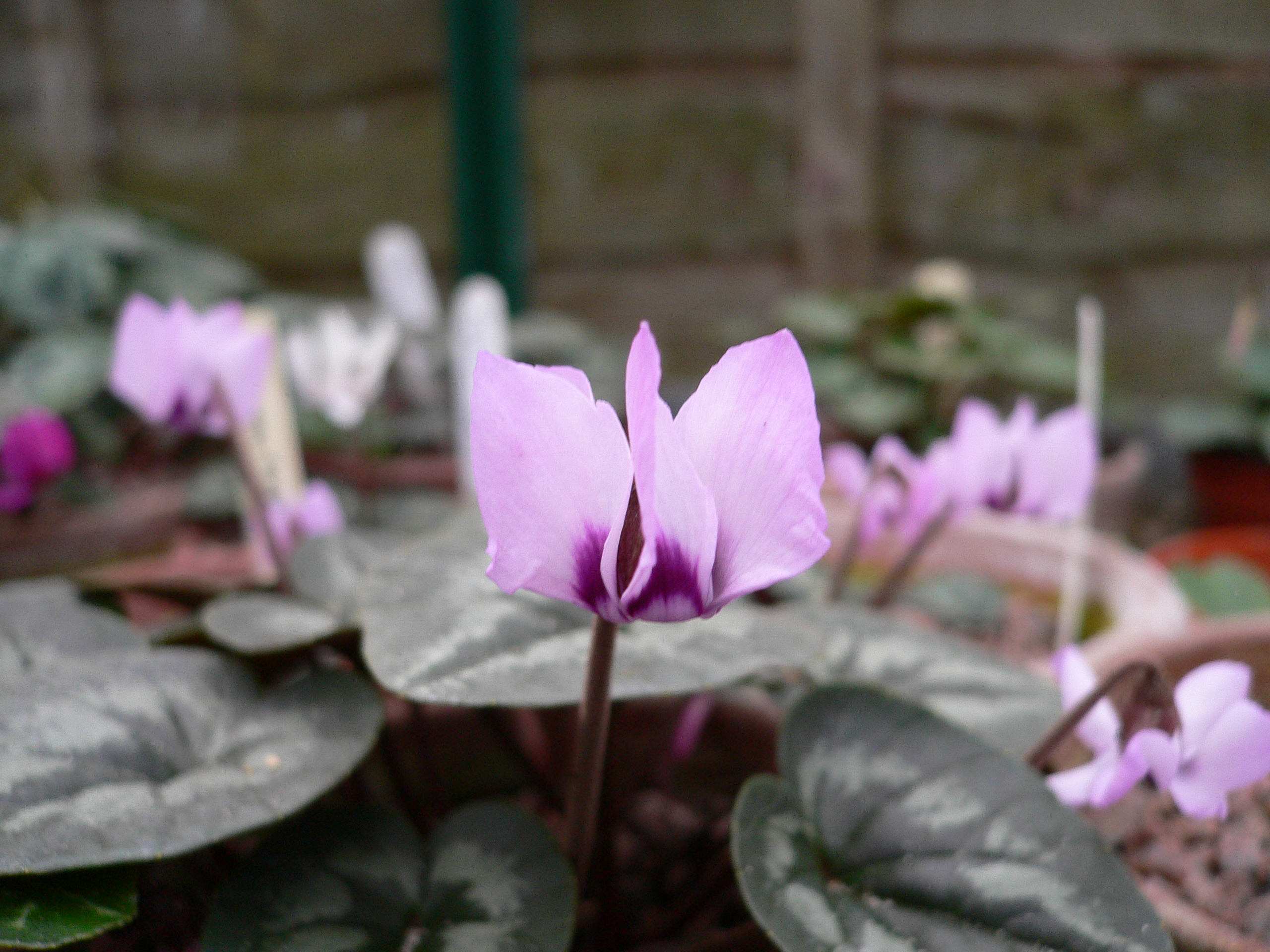

Scientific classification
- Kingdom: Plantae
- Clade: Tracheophytes
- Clade: Angiosperms
- Clade: Eudicots
- Clade: Asterids
- Order: Ericales
- Family: Primulaceae
- Genus: Cyclamen
- Subgenus: C. subg. Gyrophoebe
- Species: C. elegans

Binomial name
- Cyclamen elegans Boiss. & Buhse

= Cyclamen elegans =

Species of flowering plant in the primrose family

Cyclamen elegans (= Cyclamen coum subsp. elegans) is a perennial growing from a tuber, native to the Alborz Mountains in northern Iran and southeastern Azerbaijan. It is native to forest in the Alborz Mountains of northwestern Iran and extreme southeastern Azerbaijan below 500 m (1,600 ft) elevation, where it can even be found growing in moss on the lower limbs of trees.

It is similar to Cyclamen coum, and was once considered a subspecies (Cyclamen coum subsp. elegans), but leaves and petals are longer as well as C. elegans flowering earlier in October or November.

The petals of C. elegans also have a dark blotch at the base of each petal in the flower head.
