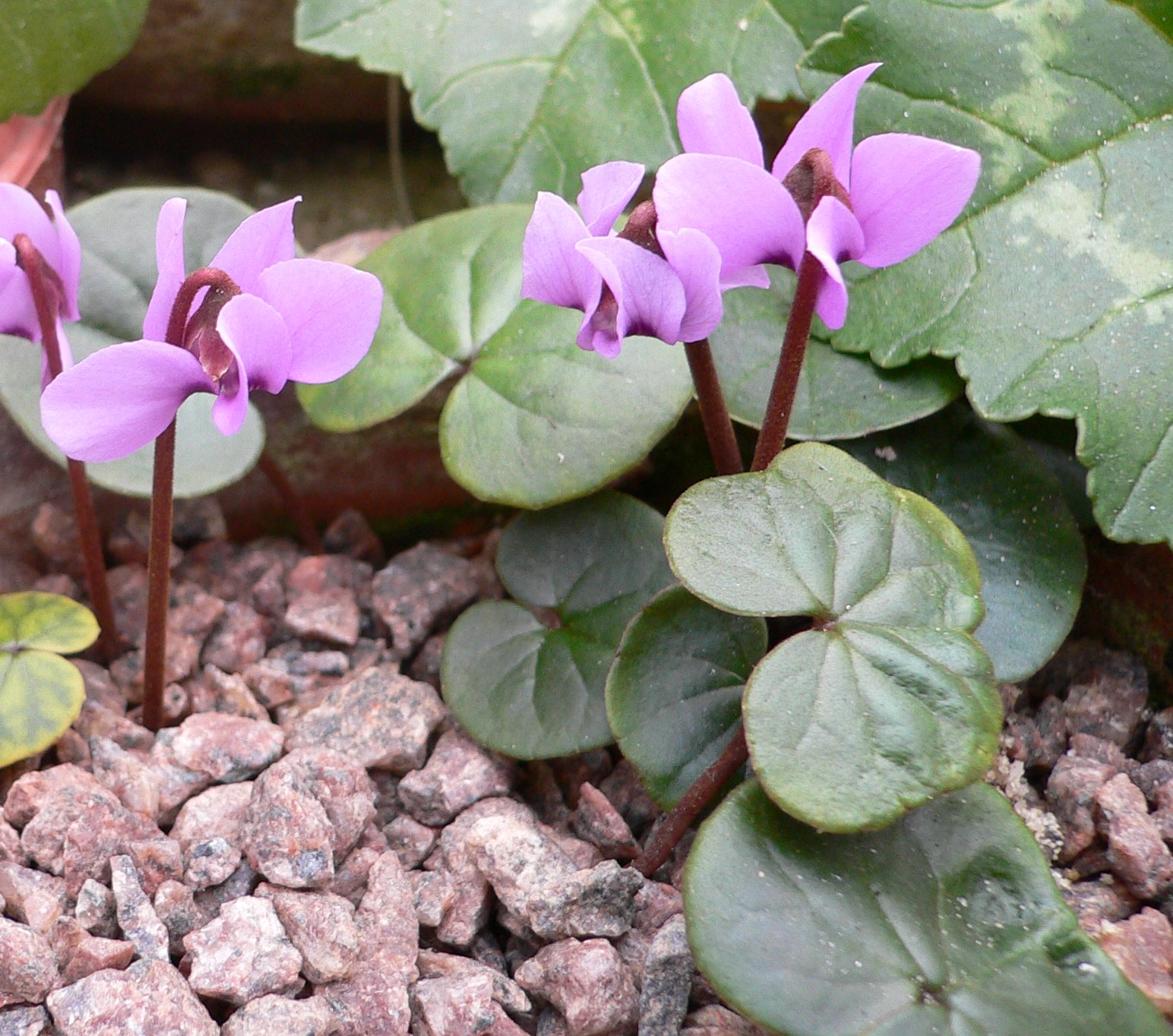

Scientific classification
- Kingdom: Plantae
- Clade: Tracheophytes
- Clade: Angiosperms
- Clade: Eudicots
- Clade: Asterids
- Order: Ericales
- Family: Primulaceae
- Genus: Cyclamen
- Subgenus: C. subg. Gyrophoebe
- Species: C. parviflorum

Binomial name
- Cyclamen parviflorum Pobed.

= Cyclamen parviflorum =

Species of flowering plant

Cyclamen parviflorum, the small-flowered cyclamen is a flowering perennial plant growing from a tuber, native to high elevations in the Pontic Mountains of northern Turkey. It is the smallest cyclamen species and the only one native to alpine tundra.

Cyclamen coum has similar flowers, but grows mostly at lower elevations. Where the two species are found together, they do not seem to hybridize.

The Latin specific epithet parviflorum means "with small flowers".

== Distribution ==
Cyclamen parviflorum is native to alpine tundra and subalpine woodland and meadow at 1,200–2,400 m (3,900–7,900 ft) above sea level in the eastern part of the Pontic Mountains of northern Turkey. In the lower-elevation part of its range, it inhabits grassy slopes, rocky places, and oriental spruce forests, sometimes beneath Rhododendron luteum. At higher elevations, it grows among Rhododendron and Vaccinium shrubs or in alpine meadow; here snow may be as much as 1 metre (3.3 ft) deep.

== Description ==
The tuber is round or round-flattened, usually less than 3 centimetres (1.2 in) across, but occasionally up to 4 centimetres (1.6 in), with roots from the center of the bottom like Cyclamen coum. In the wild, the tuber sits 5–20 centimetres (2–8 in) underground.

The leaves are wider than long. The leaf color is dark green above and deep red below. Unlike other species, such as the similar Cyclamen coum, Cyclamen parviflorum is never variegated with silver.

The flowers are fragrant and have five petals, pink to purple with a dark purple marking on the nose, short and rounded as in Cyclamen coum. They lack the white or pink "eye" below the dark marking that is present in Cyclamen coum.

== Varieties ==
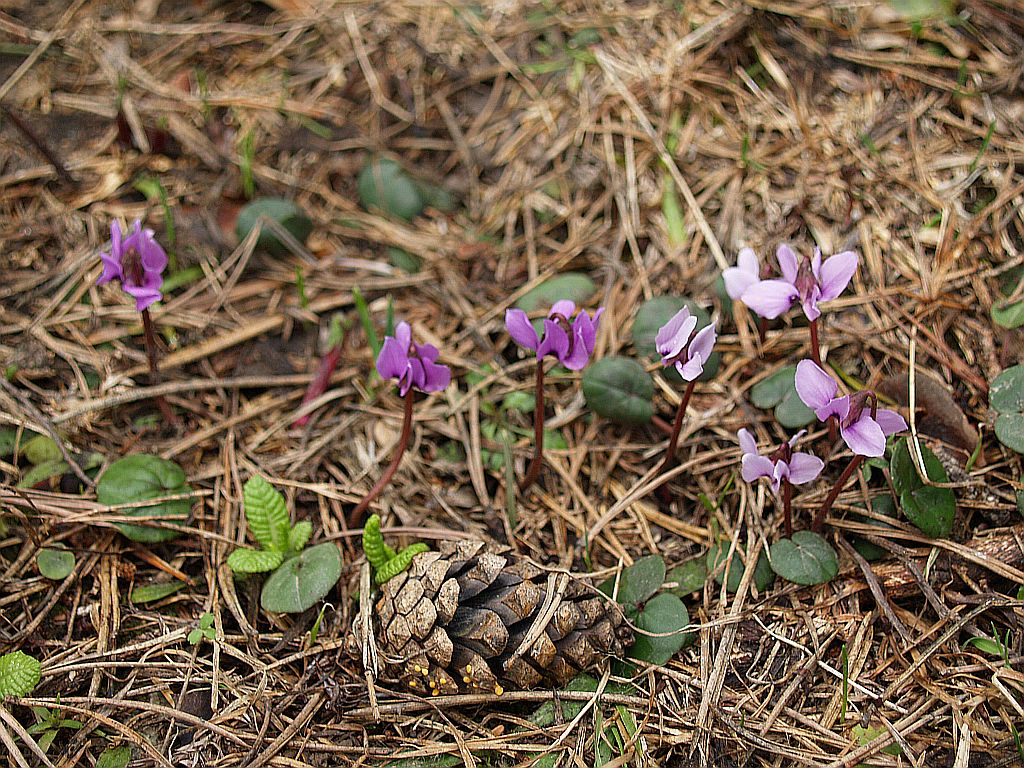
At Zigana Pass, Turkey

Cyclamen parviflorum has two varieties.

Cyclamen parviflorum var. parviflorum has petals bent upwards (4–8 mm, 1/8-5/16 inch long). It inhabits open habitats at higher elevations.

Cyclamen parviflorum var. subalpinum has petals bent outwards, not up (8–11 mm, 5/16-1/2 inch long), and twisted like the blades of a propeller, similar to Cyclamen alpinum. It inhabits densely shaded areas in lower-elevation woodland.
