= Qasr al-Jaballah =

Coordinates: 32°18.05′N 20°53.84′E

Qasr al-Jaballah (Arabic: قصر جبله) is a ruined Roman fortress in the Jebel Akhdar southeast of Marj in Cyrenaica, Libya, near Zawiyat al-Qsur.

== Description ==
The fortress is located on a hill overlooking the surrounding plain. Its walls are 39 metres long on each side of the square and nearly aligned with the compass directions. There is a tower at each corner; the northwest tower survives to a height of ten courses and part of a window is preserved. The entrance appears to be in the middle of the east side. The interior buildings are no longer visible, but architectural fragments can be seen to the west.

The structure was repaired in an inferior manner in Late Antiquity. After the Arab conquest it was used as a cemetery and elliptical arrangements of blocks derive from this use.

== Bibliography ==
- Kenrick, Philip M. (2013). Cyrenaica. London: Silphium Press. pp. 111–112. ISBN 9781900971140.
