= Qasr al-Abyad =

Medieval fortress in Cyrenaica, Libya

Coordinates: 32°10.68′N 21°11.68′E

Qasr al-Abyad (Arabic: قصر الأبيض, "white castle") is a ruined medieval fortress in the Wadi Islan, Cyrenaica, Libya.

== Description ==
The Qasr al-Abyad is located to the southeast of Marj in the Jebel Akhdar mountain range, on an old route from the Gulf of Bomba to the Gulf of Sidra, which formed part of the Hajj pilgrimage route in medieval times.

The structure is square, measuring roughly 26 metres on all sides, and its walls survive to a height of 7 metres. It was probably originally two stories high. The floor of the second floor is visible about 5–6 metres above ground level; the ground floor is presumed to be fully intact, but is not currently accessible. The outer walls are made of mud-brick with a rough stone facing and slope inwards. It closely resembles nearby Late Roman fortresses like Qasr al-Maraghah and Qasr Wurtij, but pottery finds indicate that it is a medieval imitation.

The function of Qasr al-Abyad was probably to act as refuge for a local community. It may also have acted as a communal grain store.

== Bibliography ==
- Kenrick, Philip M. (2013). Cyrenaica. London: Silphium Press. pp. 109–110. ISBN 9781900971140.
