= Zawiyat al-Qsur and Qasr Sidi al-Khadri =

Ruined farmhouses in Libya

Coordinates: 32°27.97′N 21°0.18′E

Zawiyat al-Qsur (Arabic: زاوية القسور) and Qasr Sidi al-Khadri are a pair of ruined farmhouses in the Jebel Akhdar southeast of Marj in Cyrenaica, Libya, near Qasr al-Jaballah.

== Description ==
The site is located in a fertile valley lined with fortified farmhouses are located on the high ground. In the 1960s, Zawiyat al-Qsur itself was "an imposing castle ruin" on a hill, but it has since been totally subsumed by a modern farm and only a few blocks remain visible.

Three hundred metres to the south is a second structure, called Qasr Sidi al-Khadri. It was a two-story farmhouse surrounding a small courtyard, built of ashlar masonry. The walls of the ground floor and the lower part of the upper floor are preserved. The arches of the ground-floor entrances are preserved. There is a projecting string course between the two floors, like at Qasr al-Wushish and Qasr az-Zaarura. On the north and wests sides of the building, there is a rock cut ditch. The structure dates to the Byzantine period, as shown by the style of the masonry and the presence of carved cross in one of the walls.

In modern times, the structure has become the tomb for the Sufi saint, Sidi al-Khadri. Its fate after the Libyan Civil War is unknown.

== Bibliography ==
- Kenrick, Philip M. (2013). Cyrenaica. London: Silphium Press. pp. 113–114. ISBN 9781900971140.
