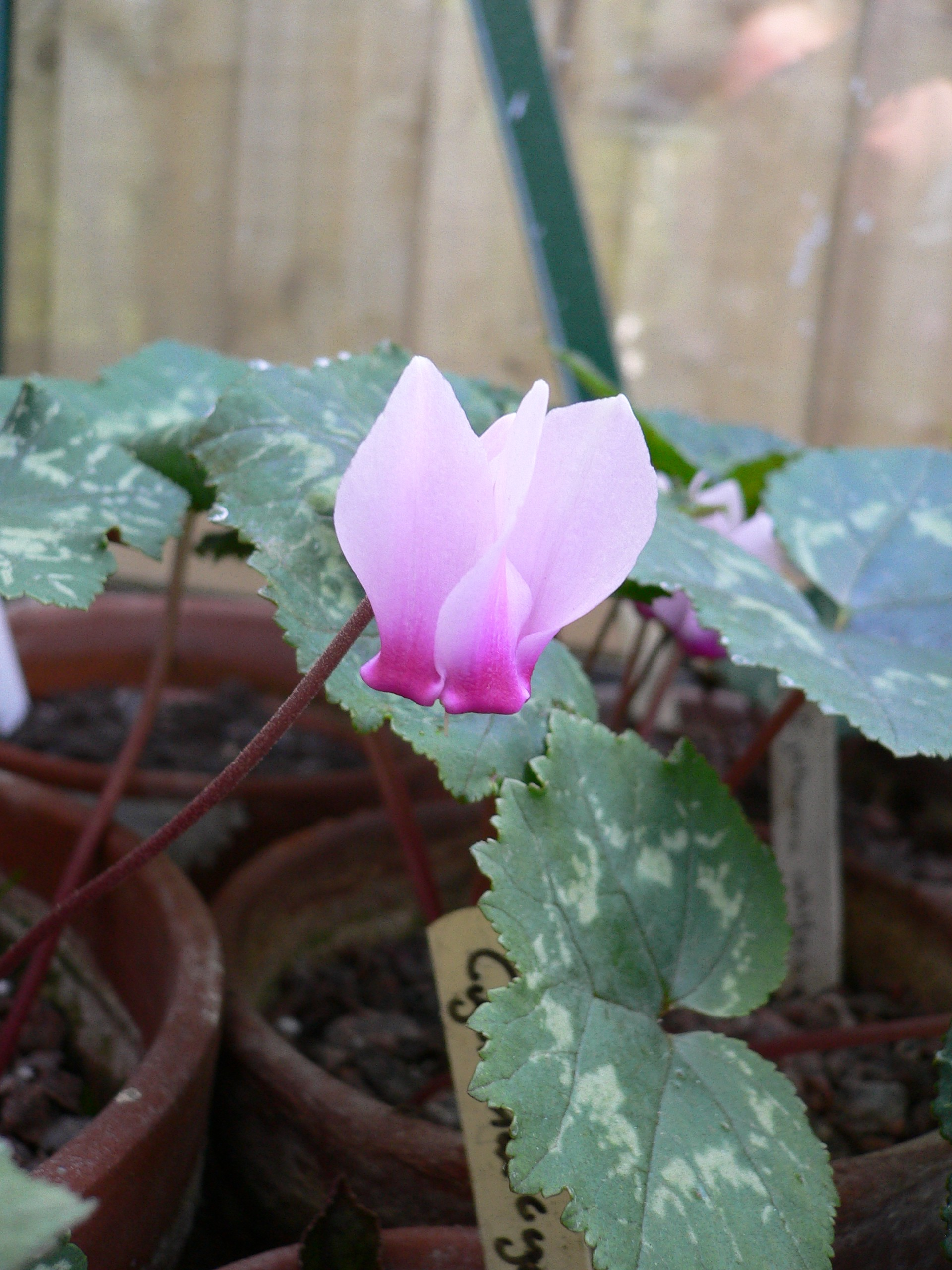

Scientific classification
- Kingdom: Plantae
- Clade: Tracheophytes
- Clade: Angiosperms
- Clade: Eudicots
- Clade: Asterids
- Order: Ericales
- Family: Primulaceae
- Genus: Cyclamen
- Subgenus: C. subg. Cyclamen
- Species: C. rohlfsianum

Binomial name
- Cyclamen rohlfsianum Asch.

Synonyms
- Cyclamen rohlfsianum f. album B.Mathew

= Cyclamen rohlfsianum =

Species of flowering plant in the primrose family

Cyclamen rohlfsianum is a species of perennial plant in the family Primulaceae. It is endemic to Libya. It grows from a tuber in shrubland, especially in limestone cracks, up to 450 m (1,500 ft) above sea level. It is one of the tenderest cyclamen species. The plant was discovered by Friedrich Gerhard Rohlfs in 1879, and was named after him in 1897 by Paul Friedrich August Ascherson.

== Description ==
Its tubers are round when young, but become irregular with age, with multiple growing points across the surface of the tuber. Cyclamen purpurascens also has irregular older tubers. Its leaves are large, with pointed lobes and prominent ribs, and wider than long. Leaves of Cyclamen hederifolium often have lobes, but are usually longer than wide. its flowers bloom in autumn with the young leaves and have 5 upswept petals, light pink with a darker nose. The stamens and pistil project below the nose, suggesting the shooting stars (Dodecatheon), but unlike any other cyclamen.

== Cultivation ==
Cyclamen rohlfsianum has a longer summer dormancy than many other cyclamen species and flowers best after a hot, sunny summer. In this way it is similar to Cyclamen graecum and Cyclamen africanum.

== Gallery ==
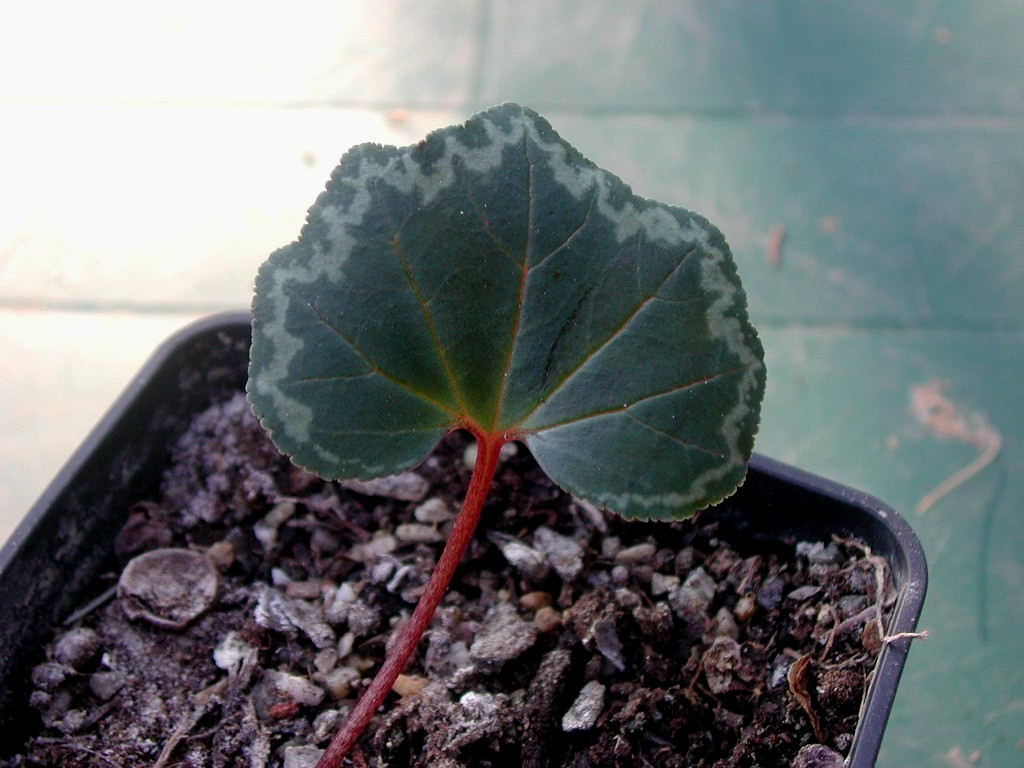
Young leaf

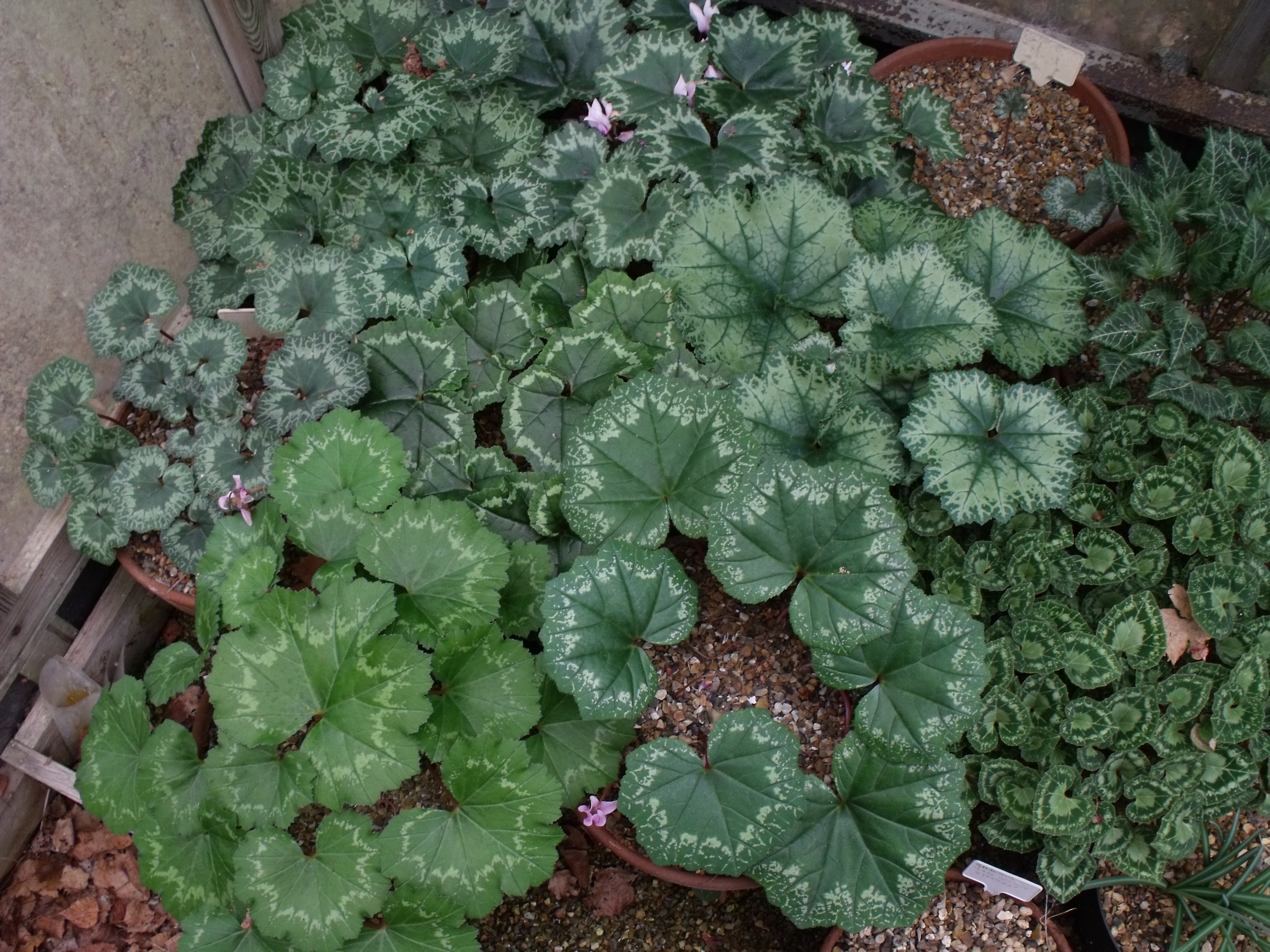
Varied leaf patterns at Tile Barn Nursery
