= Jebel Akhdar (Libya) =

Mountains in Libya

Coordinates: 32°35′52″N 21°28′22″E

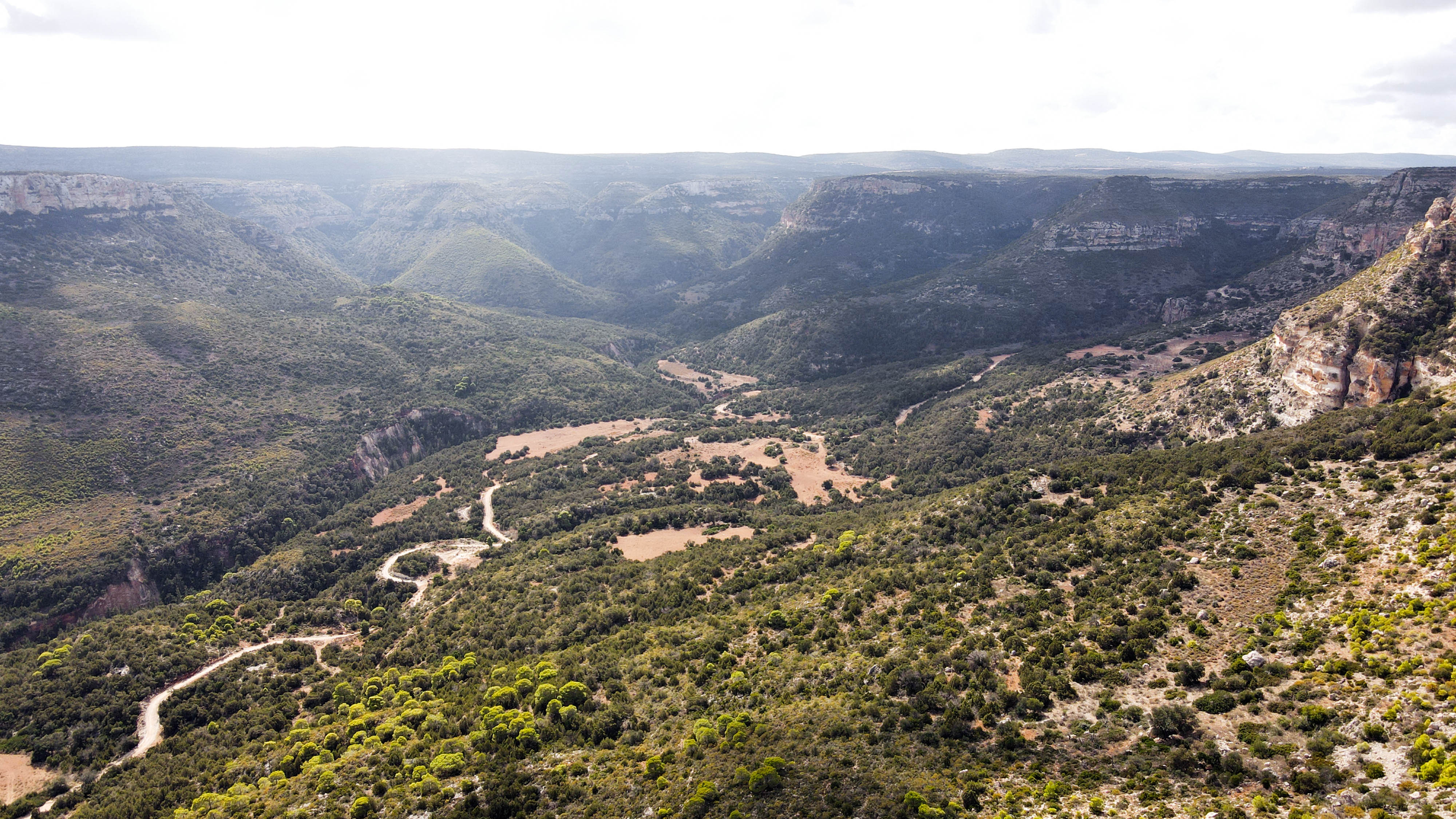
Wadi Murqus

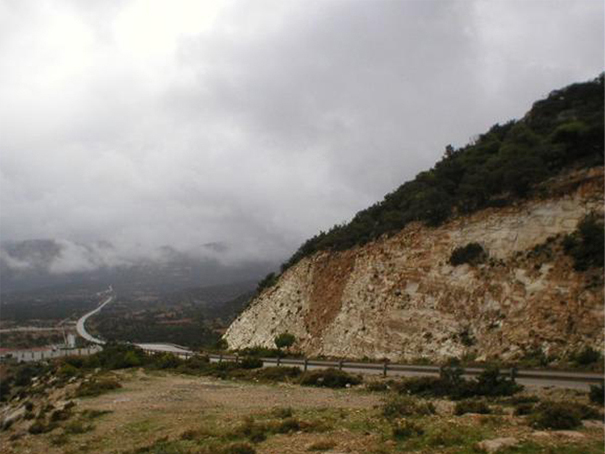
The Jebel Akhdar is Libya's wettest region. Annual rainfall averages between 400 and 600 millimeters.

The Jebel Akhdar (Arabic: الجبل الأخضر al-Jabal al-Akhḍar Arabic pronunciation: [ald͡ʒabal alʔaxdˤar], Italian: Gebel el-Achdar, English: The Green Mountain) is a heavily forested, fertile upland area in northeastern Libya. It is located in the modern shabiyahs or districts of Derna, Jabal al Akhdar, and Marj.

== Geography ==
The Jebel Akhdar consists of a mountainous plateau rising to an altitude of 900 metres (3,000 ft), cut by several valleys and wadis. It forms the north-western part of the peninsula that sticks north into the Mediterranean Sea, with the Gulf of Sidra on the west, and the Levantine Basin on the east. It runs from Bengazi eastward to just east of Derna, fronting the coast for about 330 kilometres (210 mi). Due to erosion and deposition, the plateau is sometimes as much as 16 kilometres (9.9 mi) from the shore, but it forms cliffs on the headlands. The final uplift and arching of the plateau was completed in the Miocene.

The region is one of the very few forested areas of Libya, which taken as a whole is one of the least forested countries on Earth. The Jebel Akhdar is the wettest part of Libya, receiving some 600 millimetres (24 in) of precipitation annually. The high rainfall contributes to the area's large forests containing Chammari, and enables rich fruit, potato, and cereal agriculture, something of a rarity in an arid country like Libya. Camels, goats and sheep are herded in and around the Jebel Akhdar and the herders tend to be nomadic.

== Flora ==
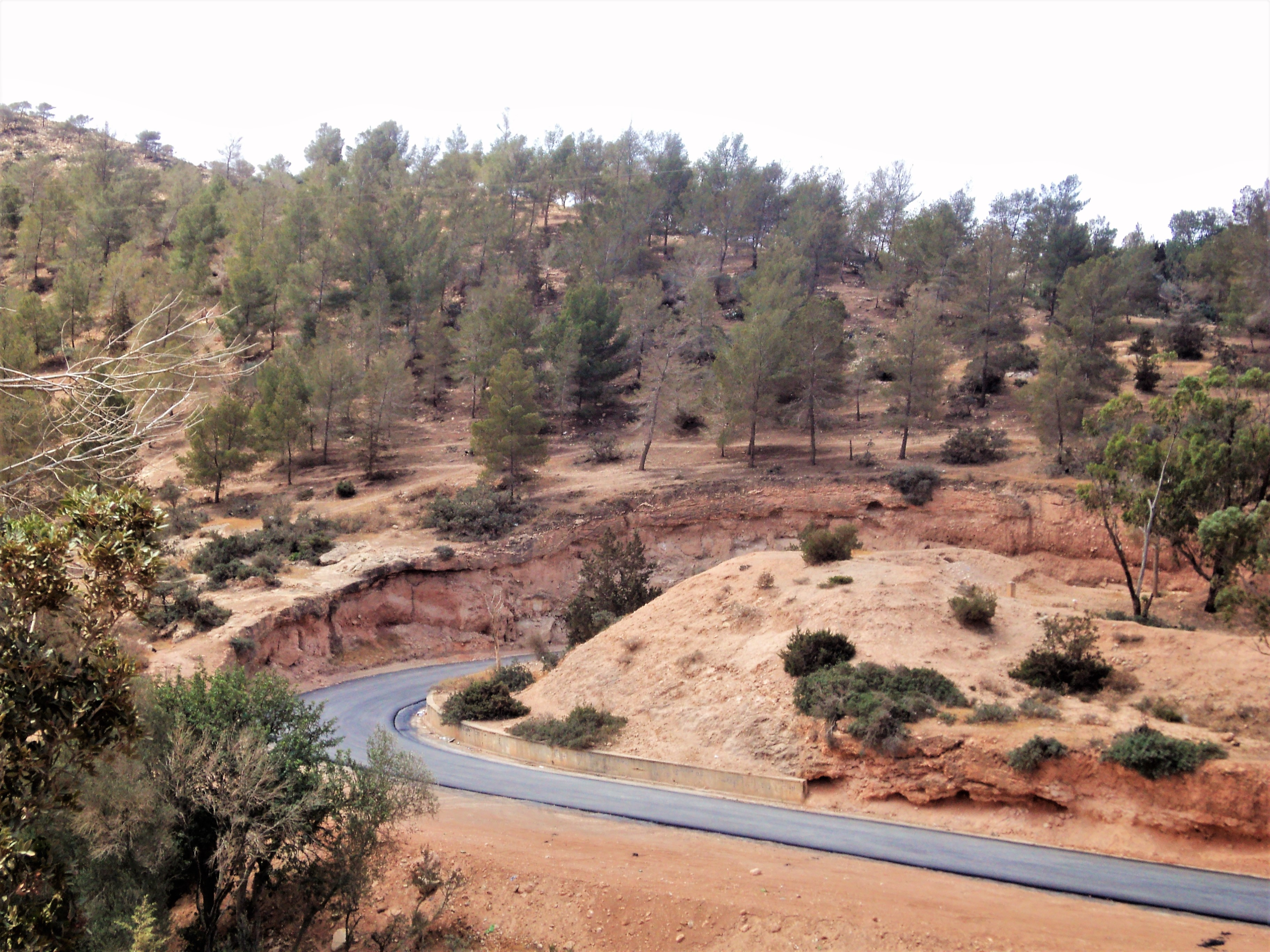
Sparsely-forested area in the Al-Bakour escarpment of the Akhdar mountains

In marked contrast to the aridity prevailing in most of Libya, there are forested areas in this region totalling around 3200 km^{2}, although approximately a third of the original forest has already been destroyed to make way for agriculture. In addition to the forests there are also large areas of maquis and steppe-like vegetation. Typical maquis species are the Phoenician juniper (Juniperus phoenicea), the mastic tree (Pistacia lentiscus), the Kermes oak (Quercus coccifera) and the carob tree (Ceratonia siliqua). In the drier steppe-like areas, branched asphodel (Asphodelus ramosus), prickly burnet (Sarcopoterium spinosum) and white wormwood (Artemisia herba-alba) predominate. More than half of the endemic plant species in Libya are to be found in the Jebel Akhdar and, of these, seven are found only in the region: Arbutus pavarii, Arum cyrenaicum, Bellis sylvestris var. cyrenaica, Cyclamen rohlfsianum, Cynara cyrenaica, Onopordum cyrenaicum and Romulea cyrenaica.

== History ==
=== Ancient ===
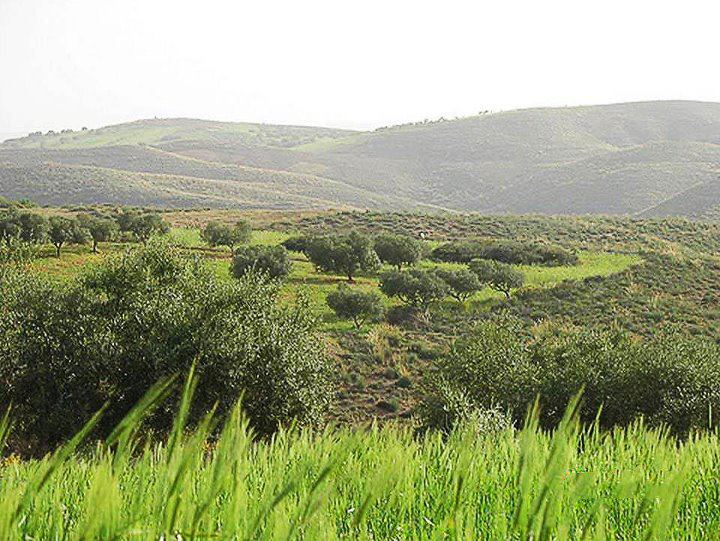

Documents created during the New Kingdom of Egypt record that to the west there were large populations of metal workers who lived in towns and had plentiful livestock. The only plausible location for these "Libyans" is the Jebel Akhdar.

The ancient Greek colony of Cyrene was located in a lush valley in the Jebel Akhdar, with the ruins remaining. It was the Greeks who introduced farming to the Jebal Akhdar when they colonised its verdant valleys in around 600 BC.

=== Italian occupation ===
During the Italian occupation these mountains were identified as a promising area for agriculture and many Italians moved here in the 1930s. This settlement was interrupted during World War II and the villages and farms were deserted and were later reoccupied by Libyans. The mountain chain was the site of major battles between the British Commonwealth and the Axis forces during World War II.

=== Liberation ===
The Libyan leader Omar al-Mukhtar used this heavily forested mountainous region to resist the Italian colonization of Libya for more than twenty years.

== Notable people ==
- Mabrouka al-Tabiba, midwife

== Galleries ==
=== Landscapes ===
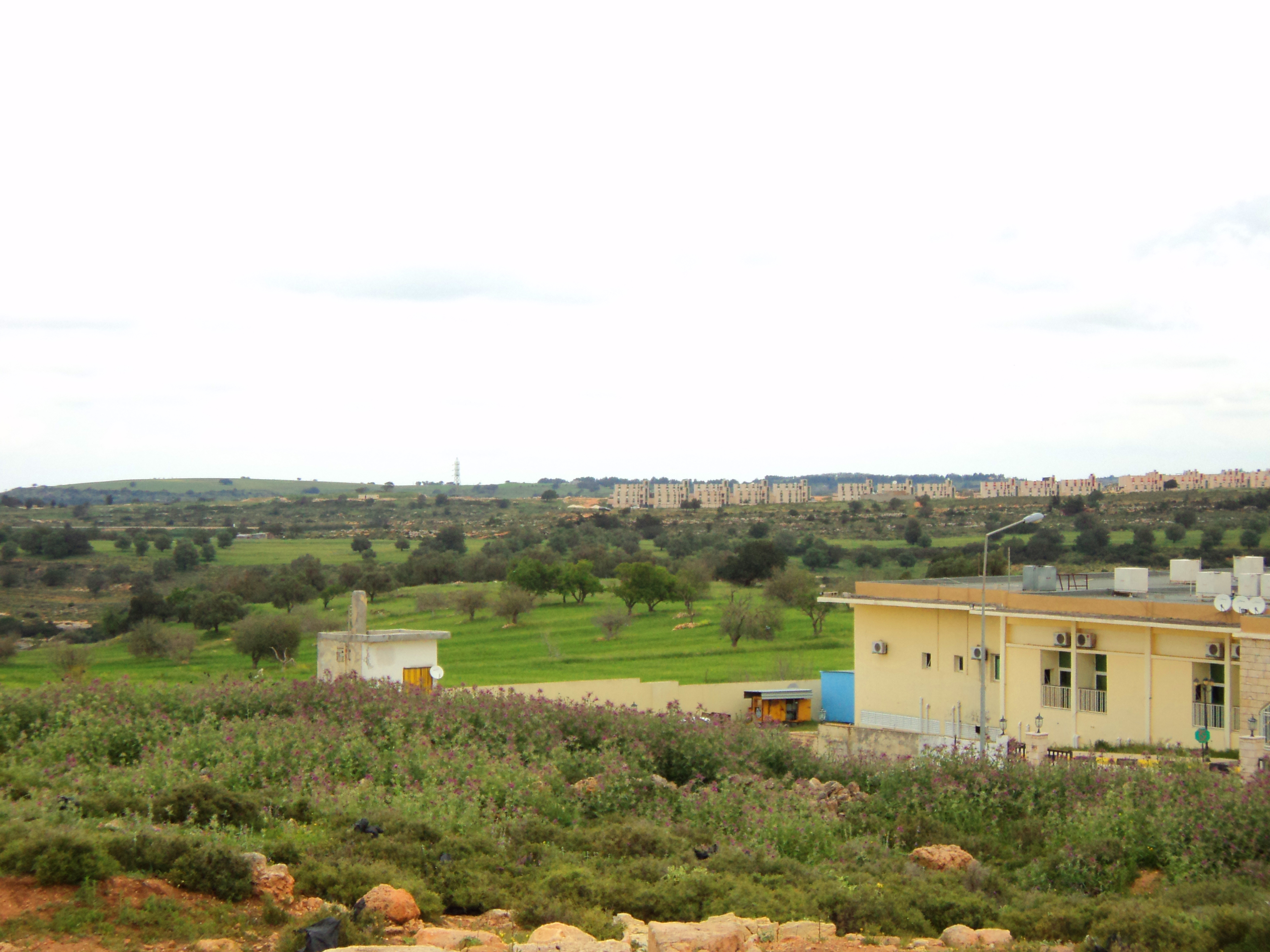
Area near the centre of Jebel Akhdar (outskirts of the city of Bayda)

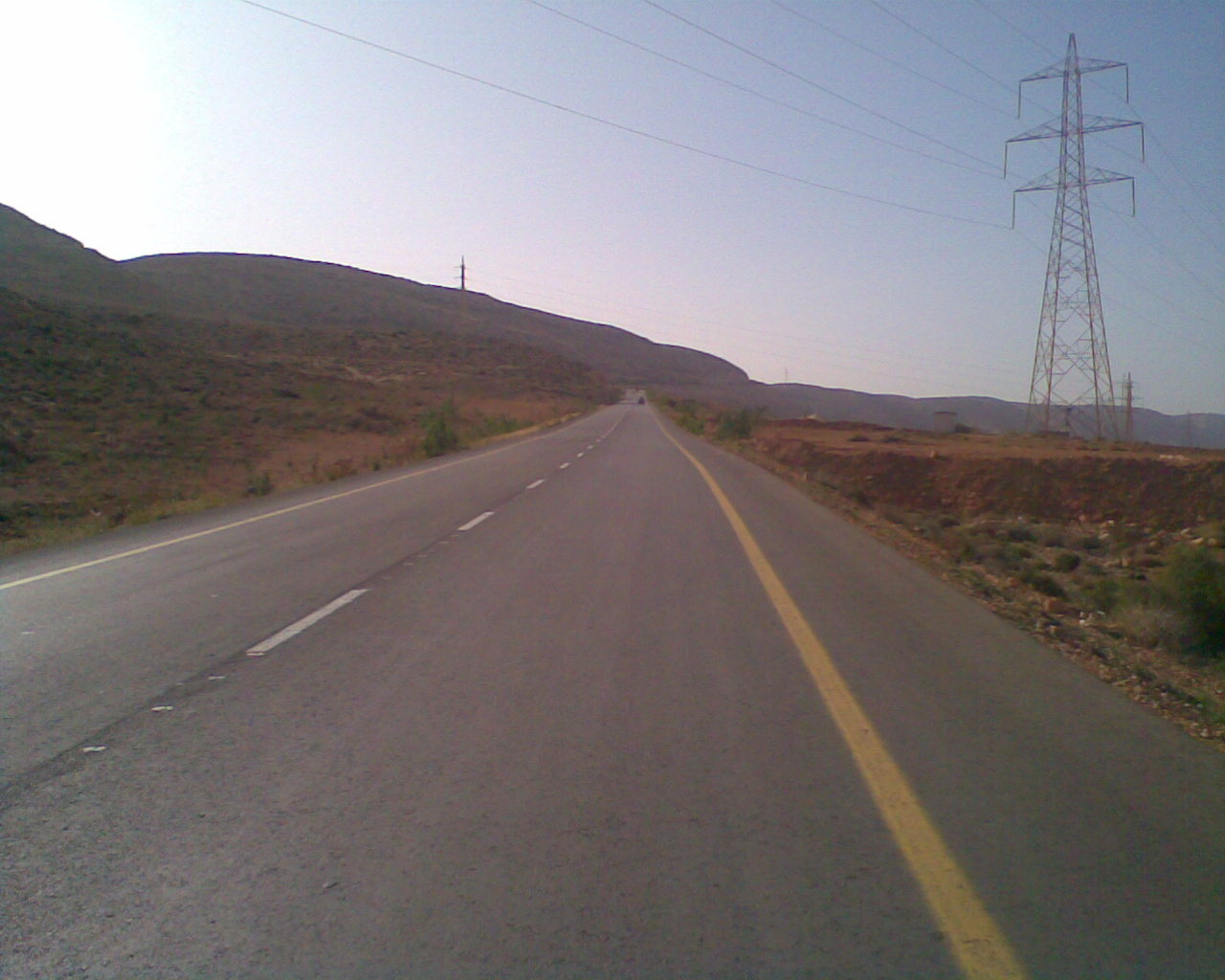
Eastern end of Jebel Akhdar (near Derna)

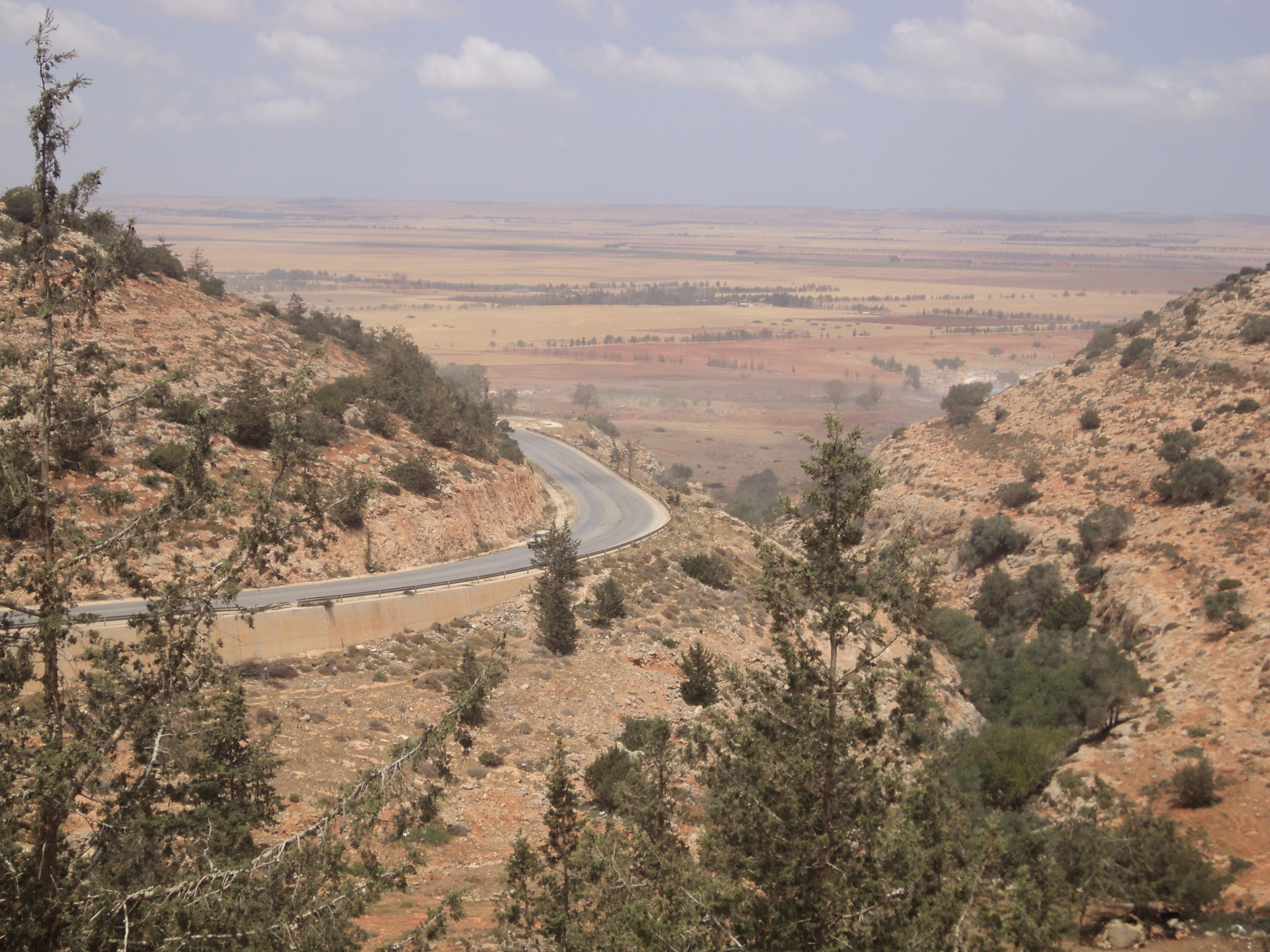
Marj escarpment area

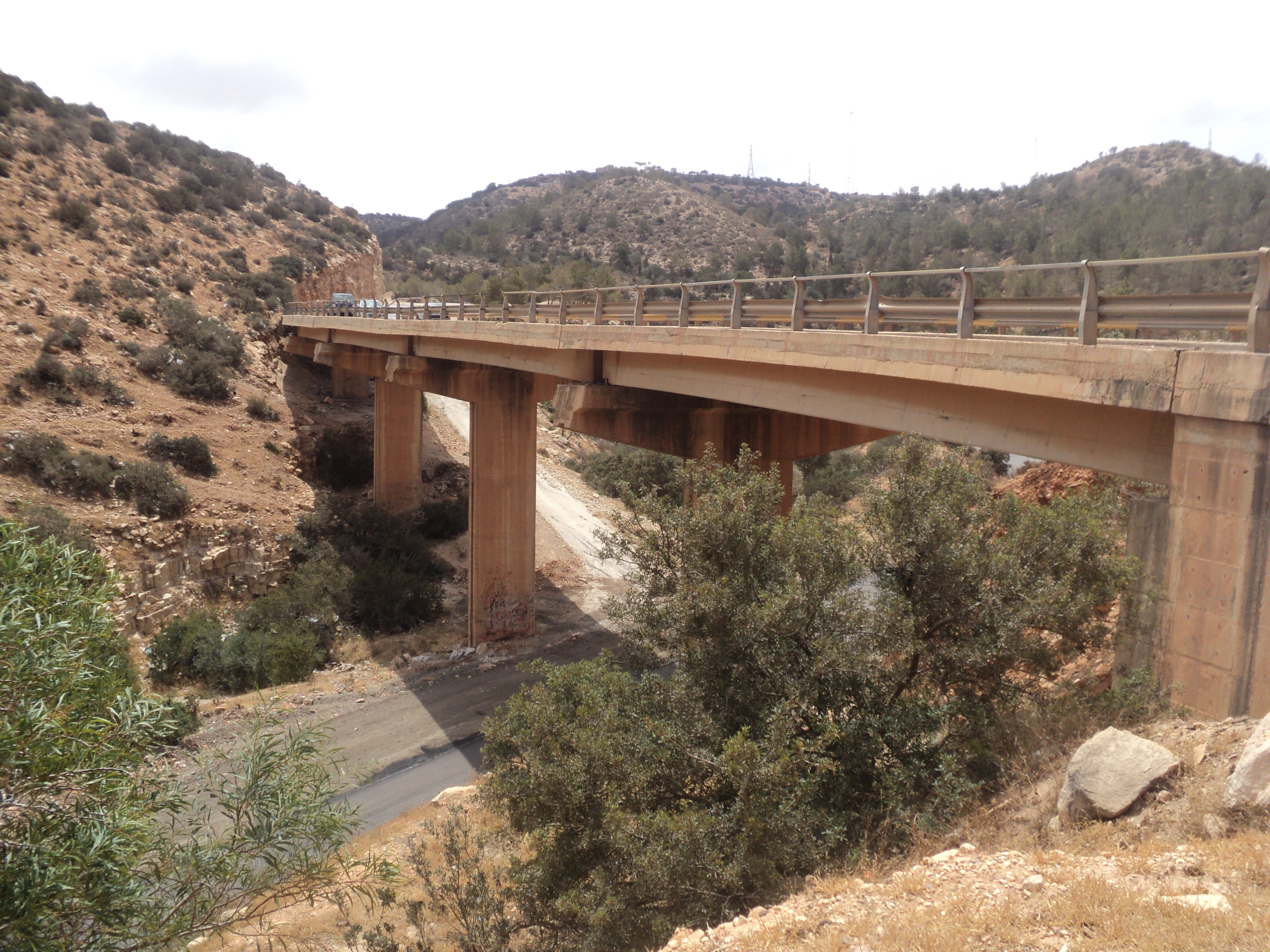
Al Bakour escarpment area

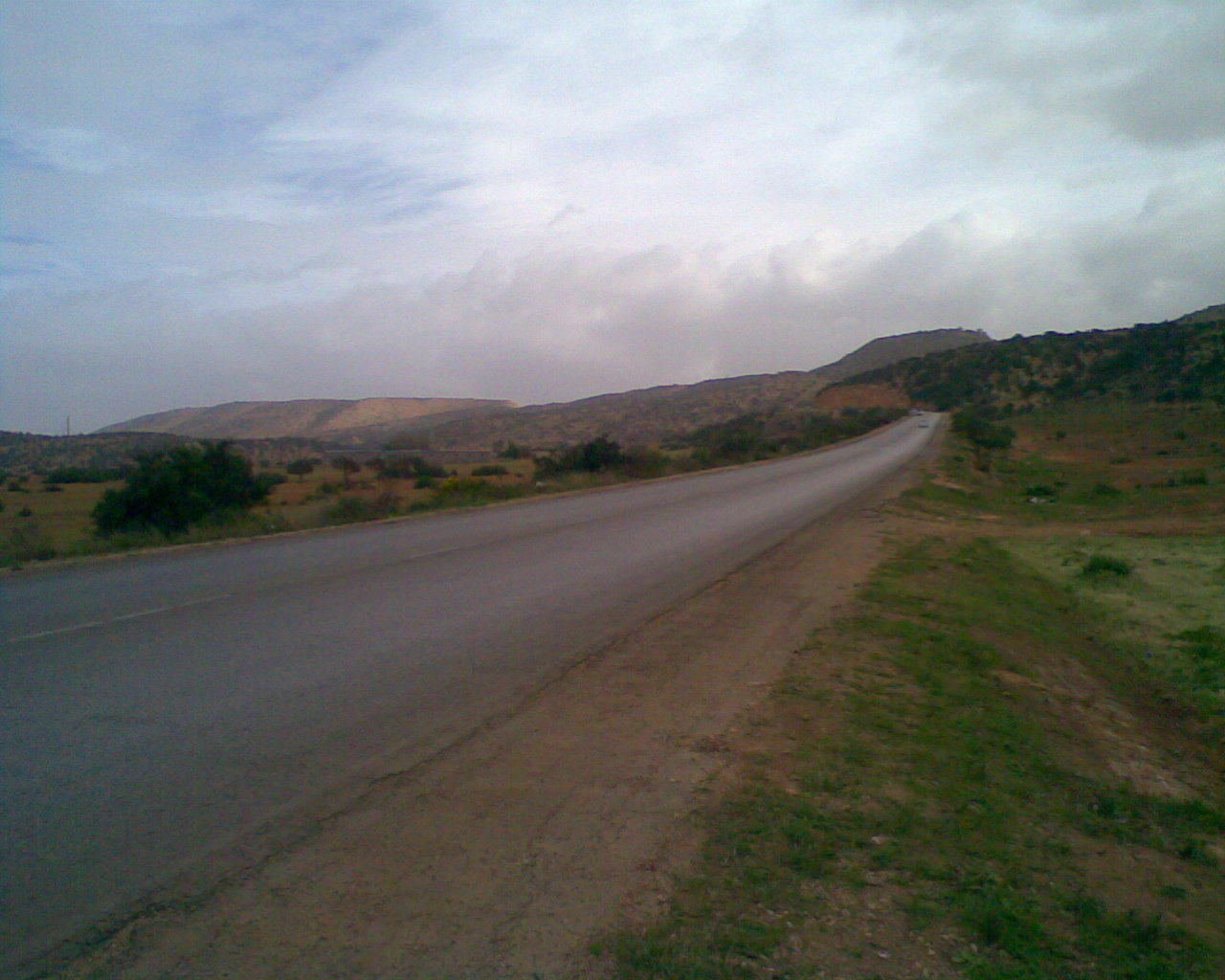
Al Bakour at the western end of Jebel Akhdar, near Taucheira

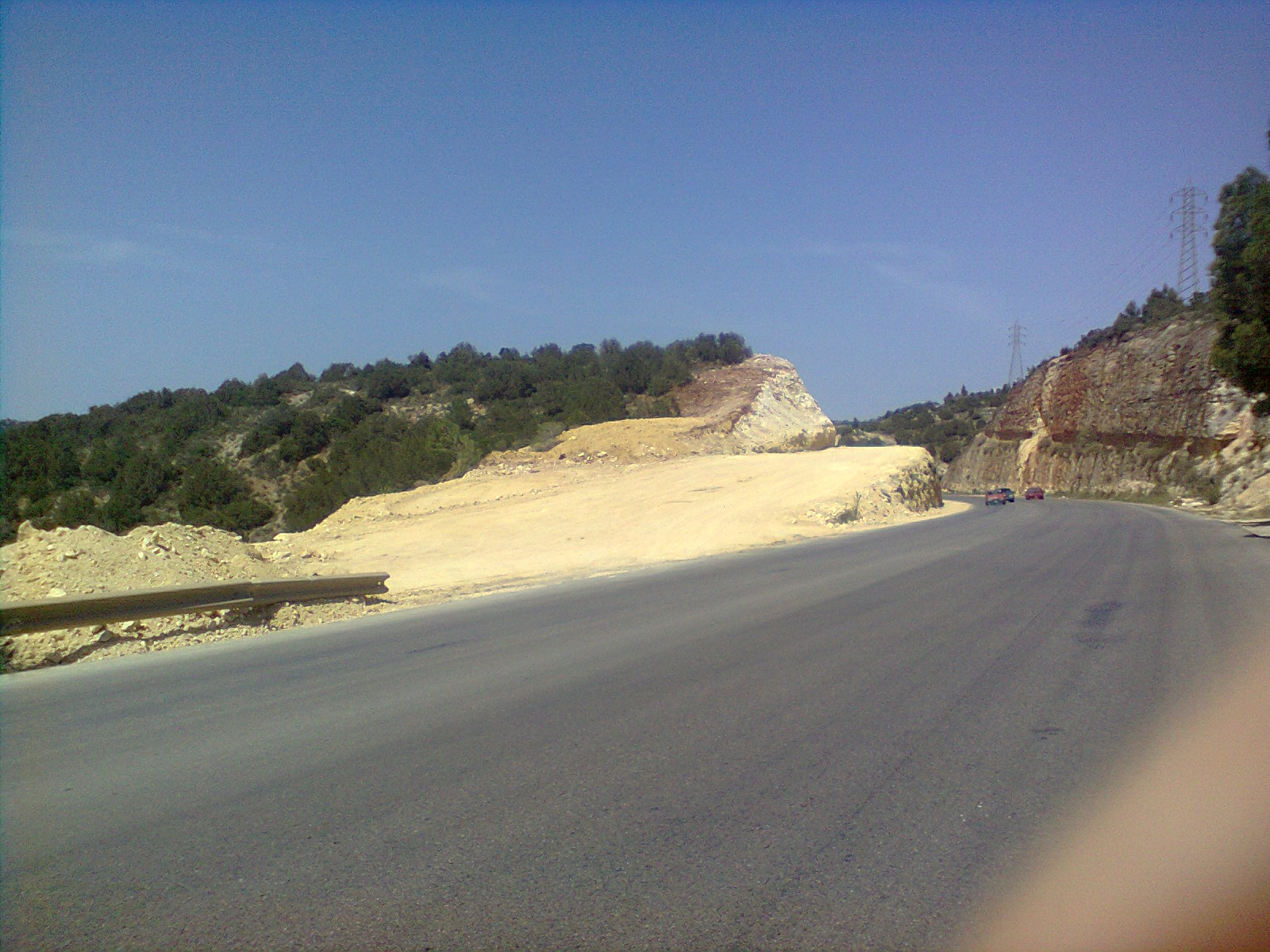
An example of the severe soil erosion which can result from deforestation in the Jebel Akhdar (near Wadi el Kuf Bridge)

=== Flora ===
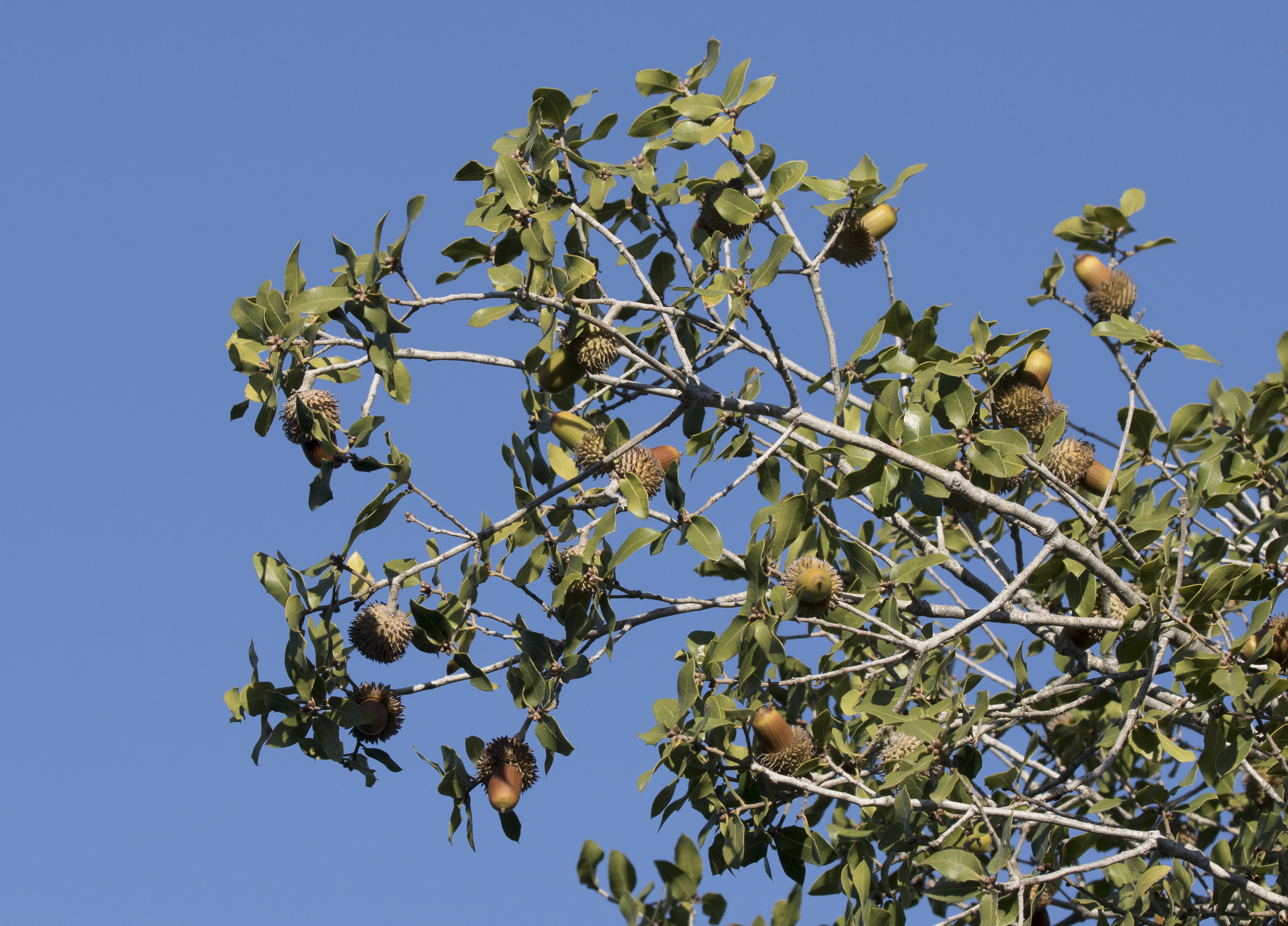
Quercus coccifera (Fagaceae)

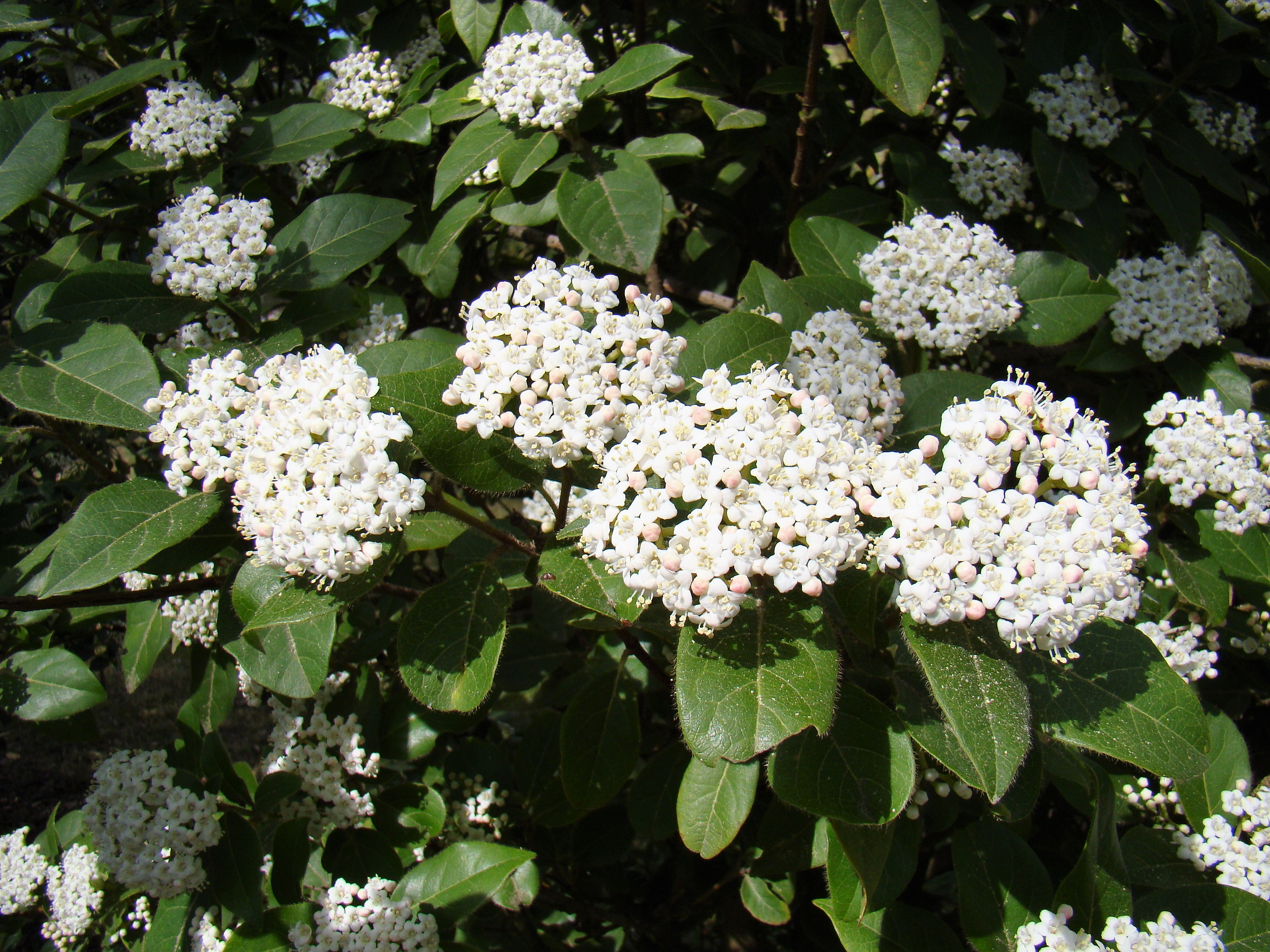
Viburnum tinus (Viburnaceae)

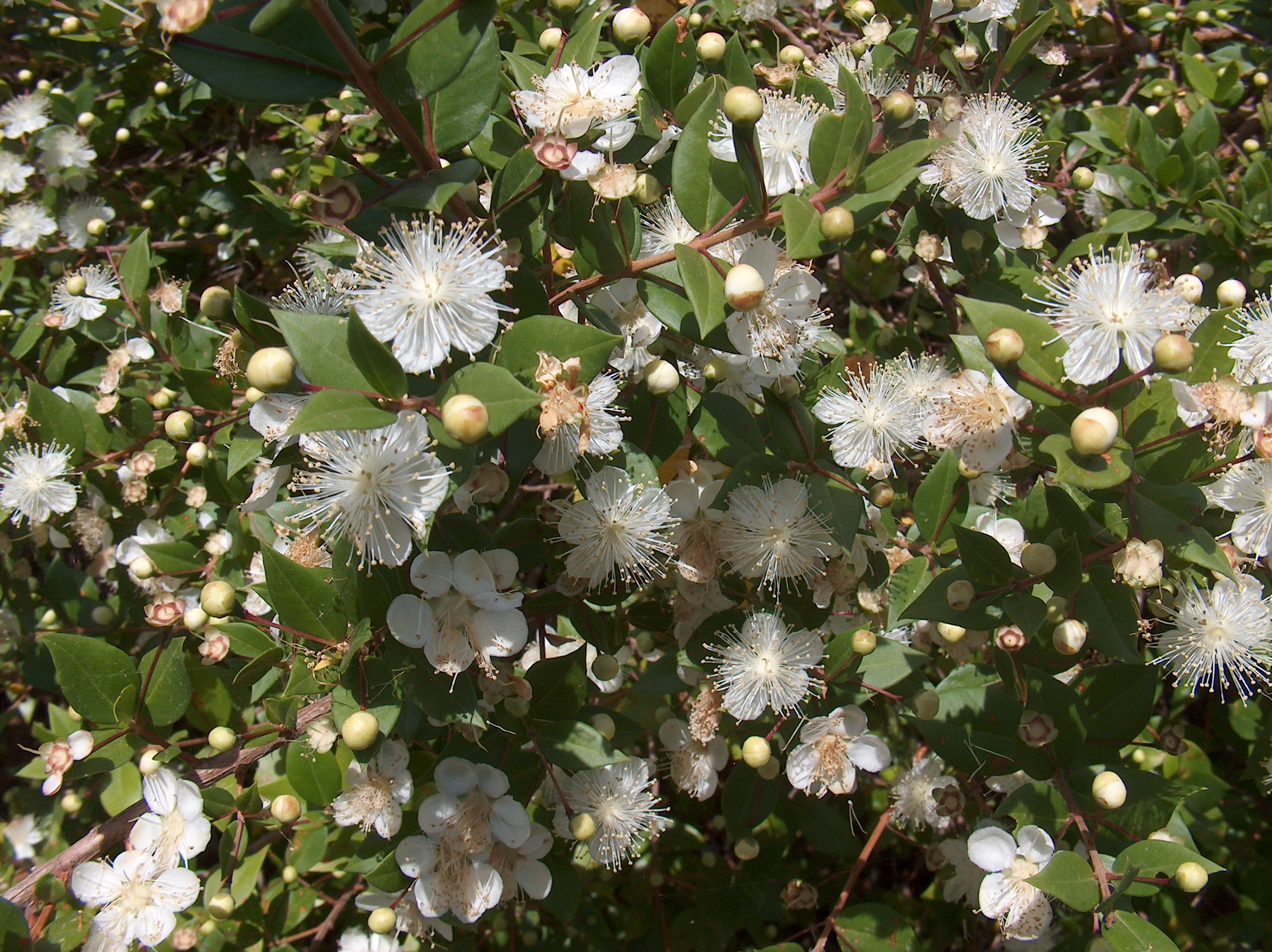
Myrtus communis (Myrtaceae)

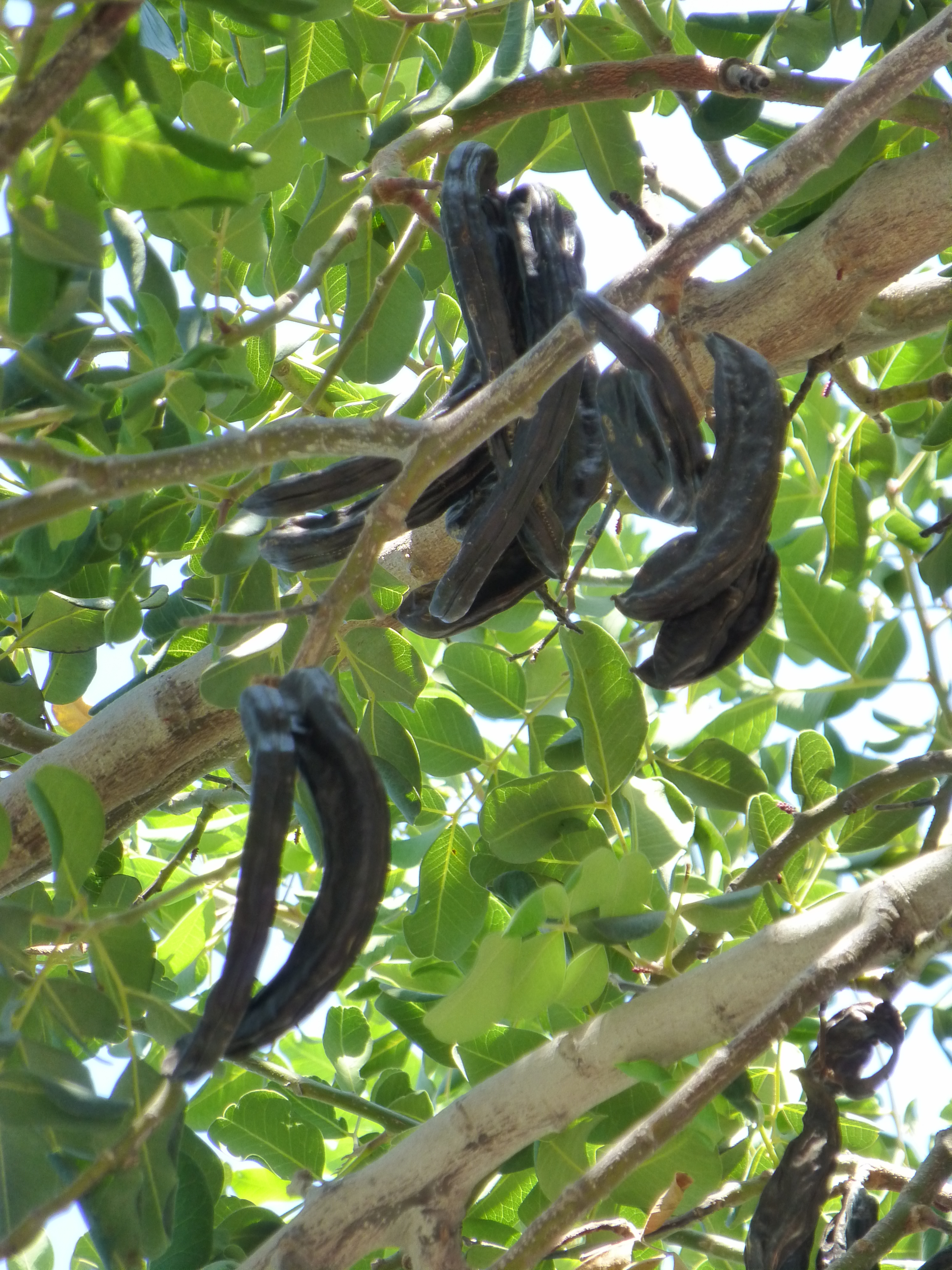
Ceratonia siliqua (Fabaceae)

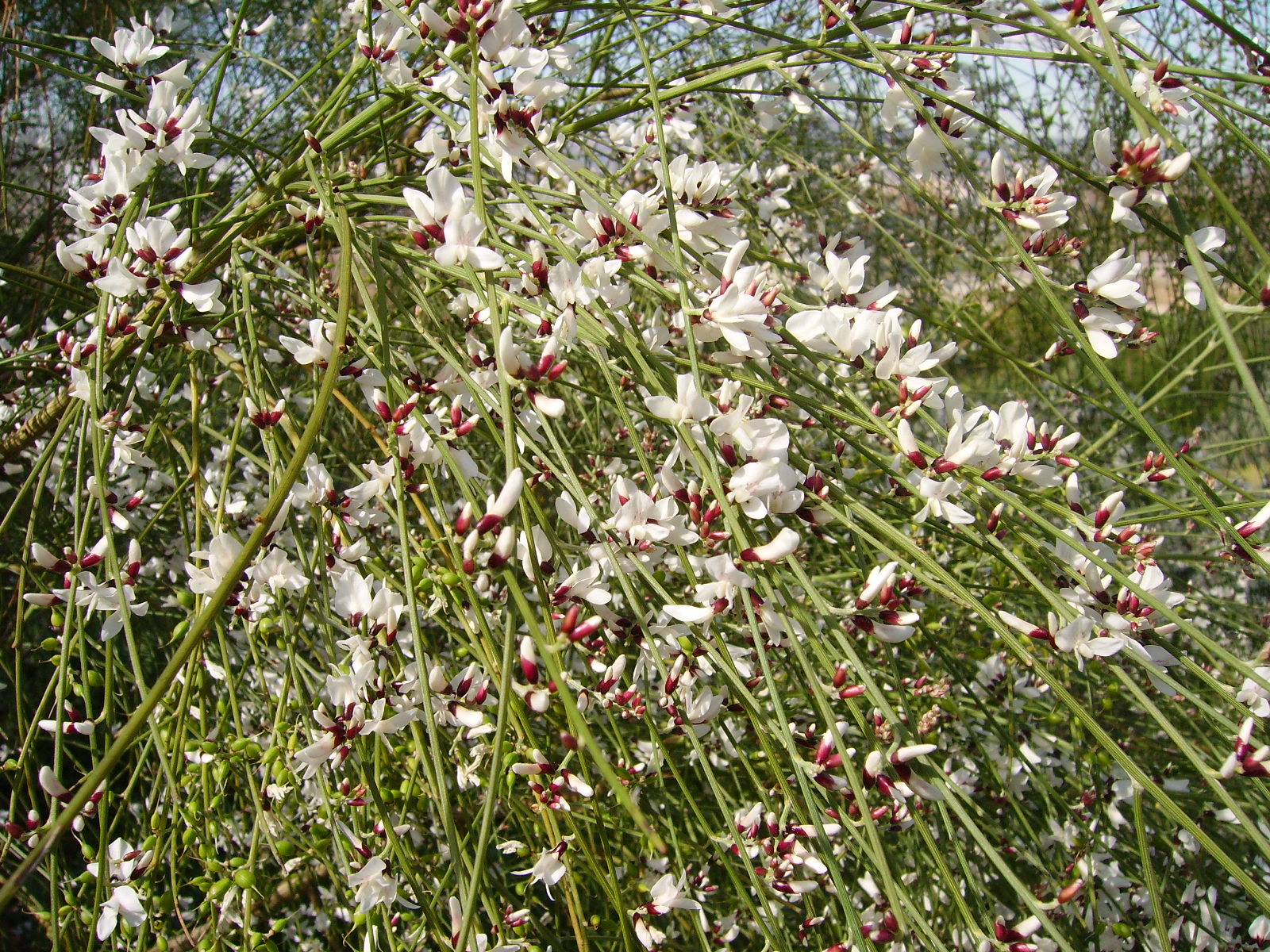
Retama raetam (Fabaceae)

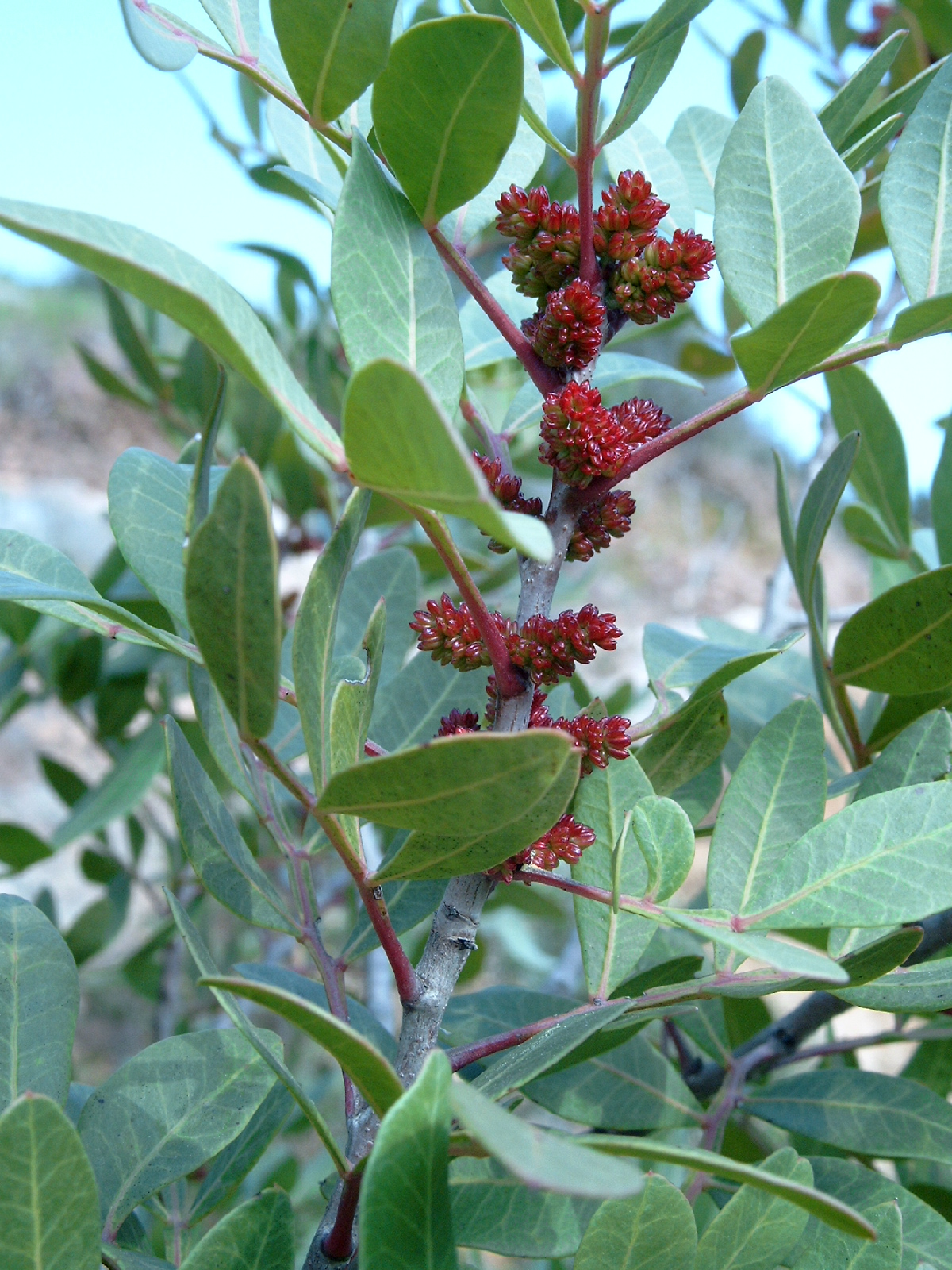
Pistacia lentiscus (Anacardiaceae)

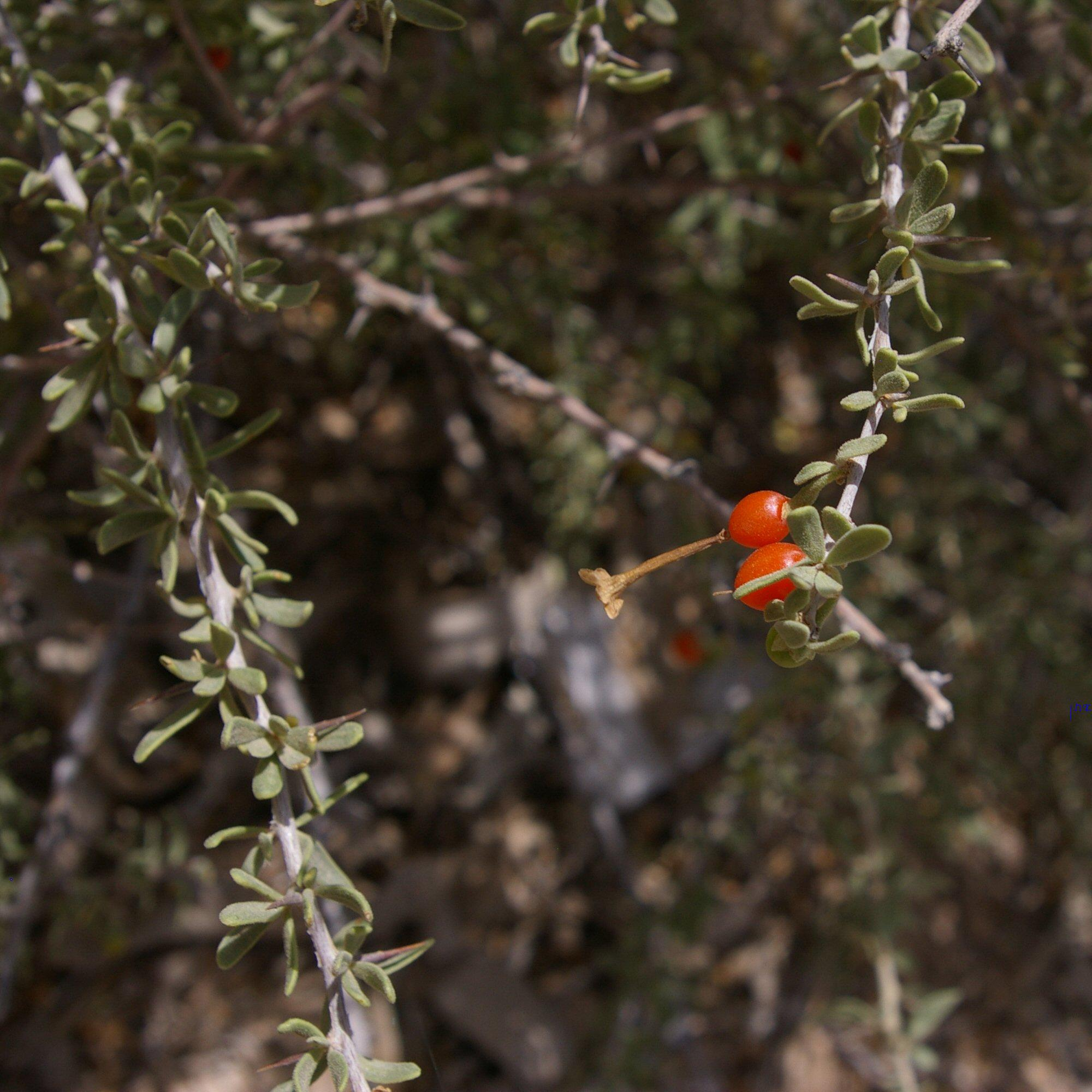
Lycium shawii (Solanaceae)

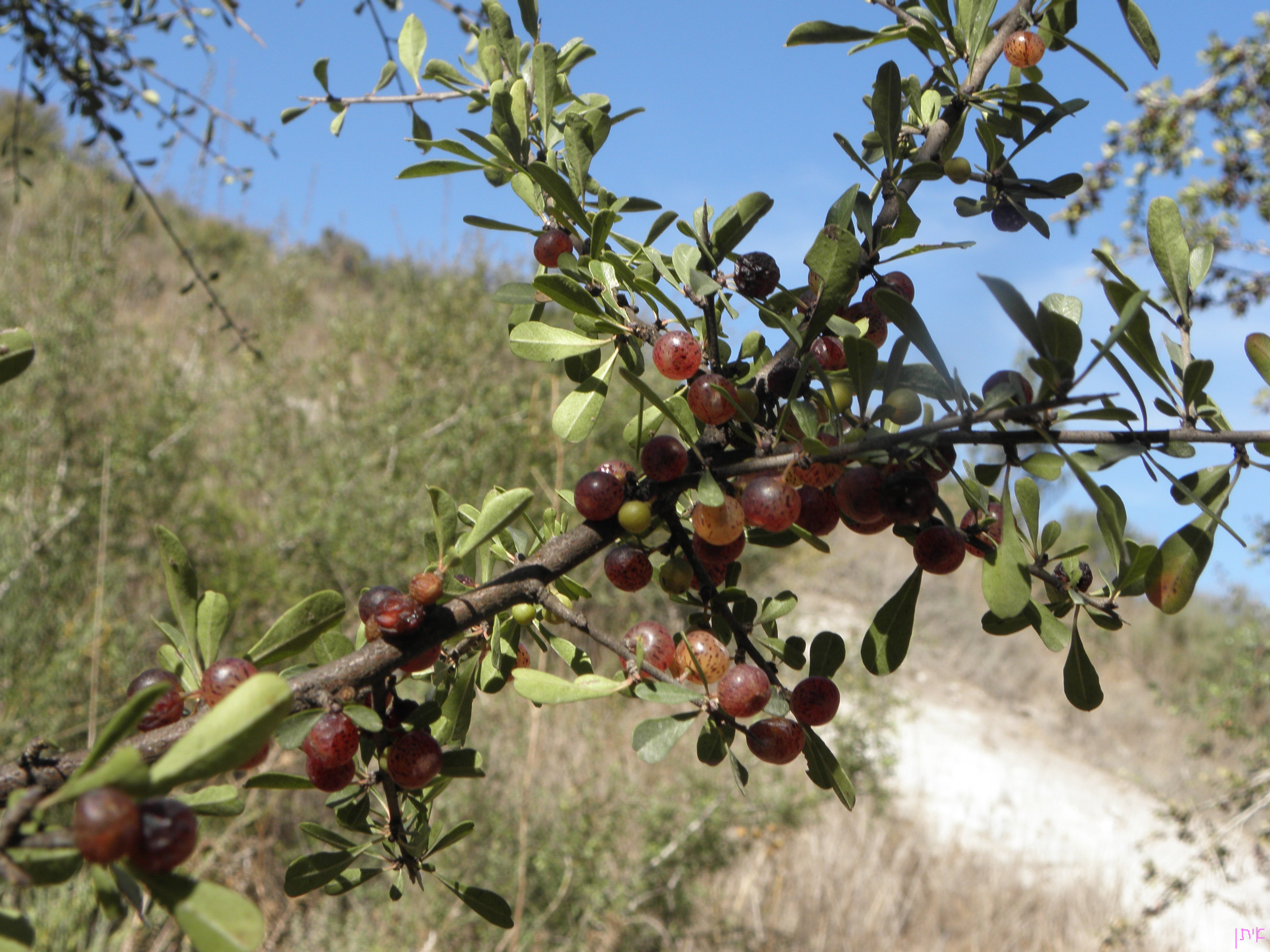
Rhamnus lycioides (Rhamnaceae)

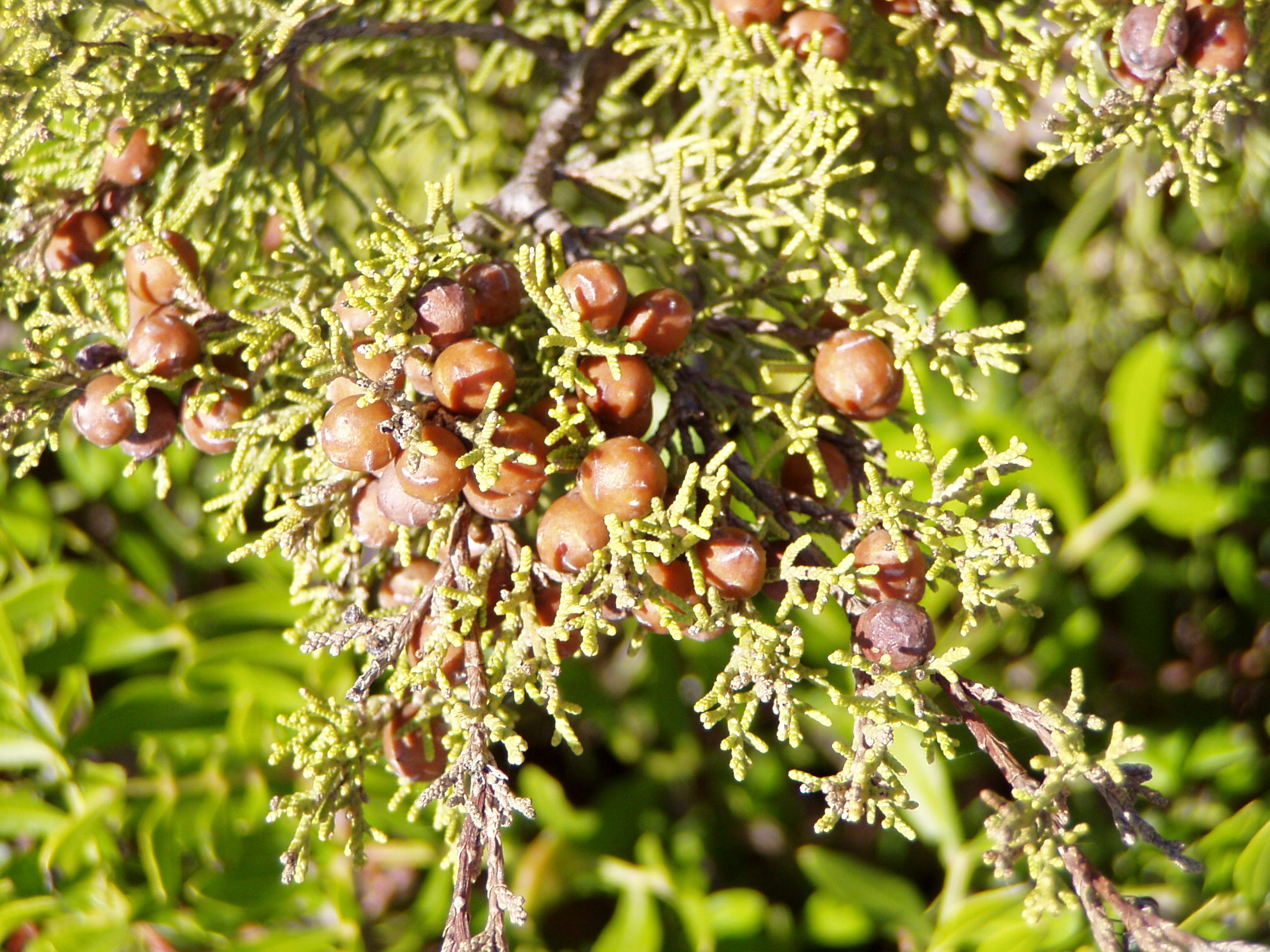
Juniperus phoenicea (Cupressaceae)

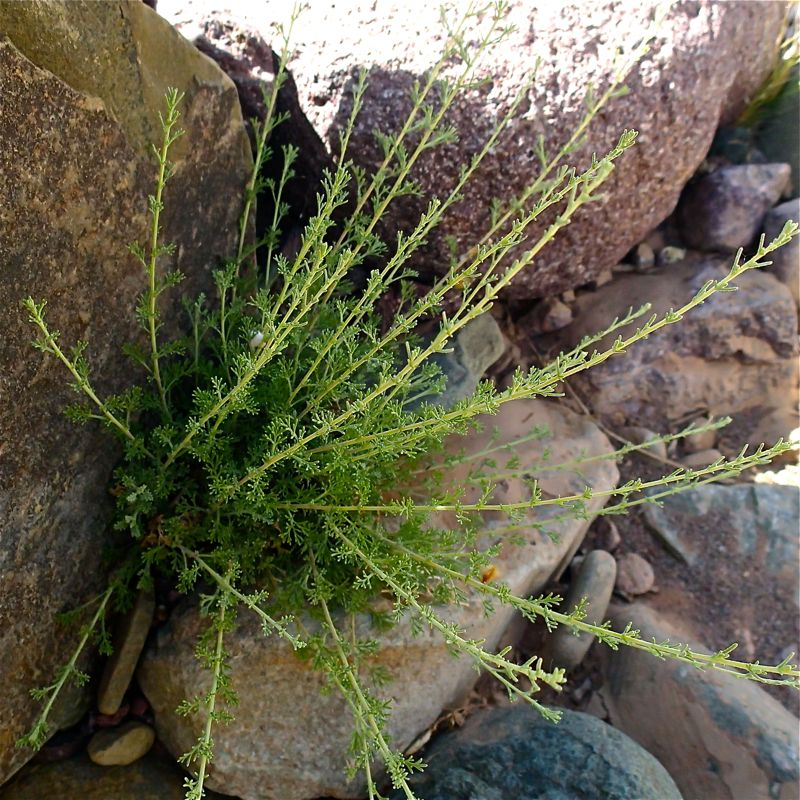
Artemisia herba-alba (Asteraceae)

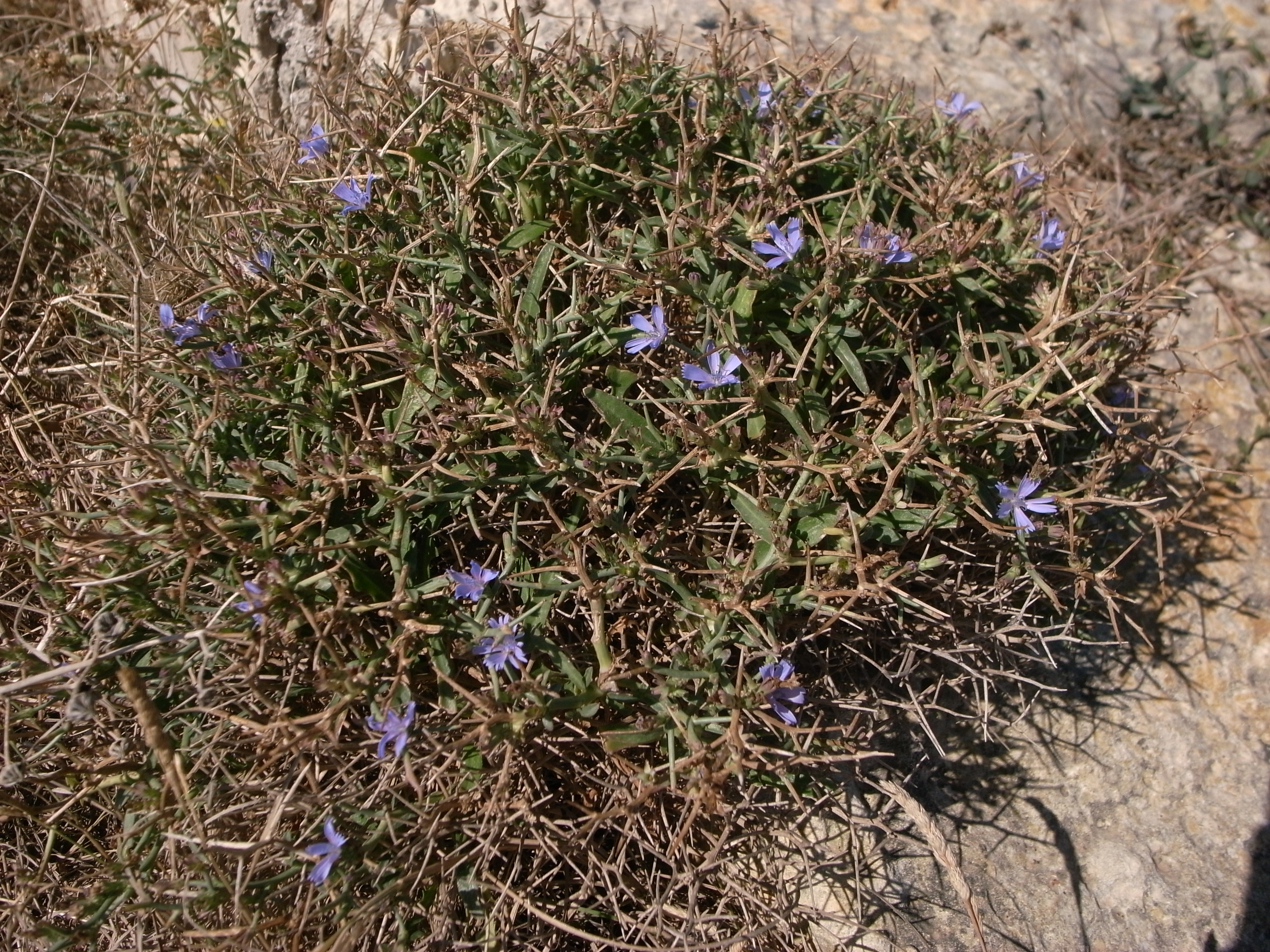
Cichorium spinosum (Asteraceae)

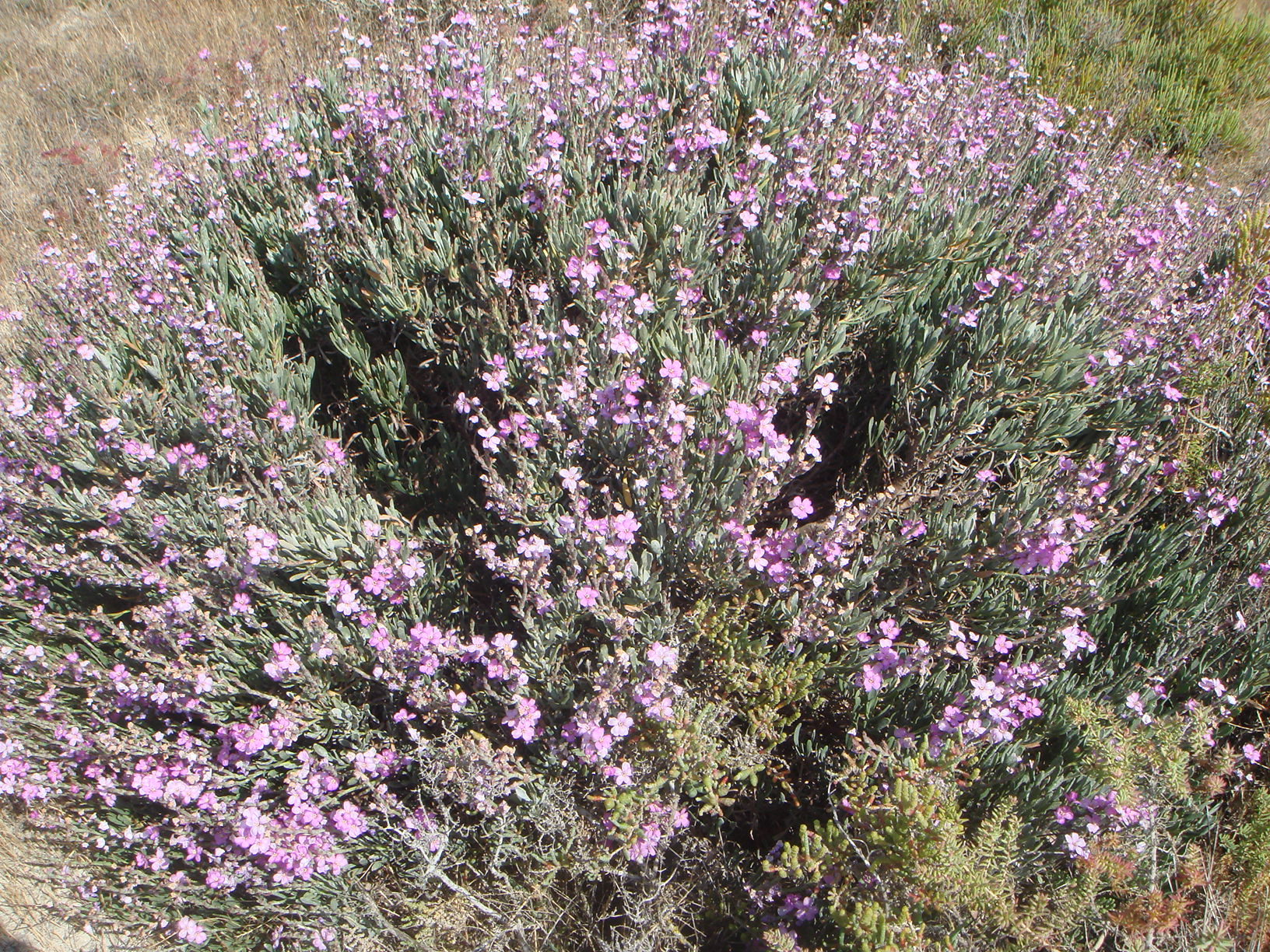
Limoniastrum monopetalum (Plumbaginaceae)

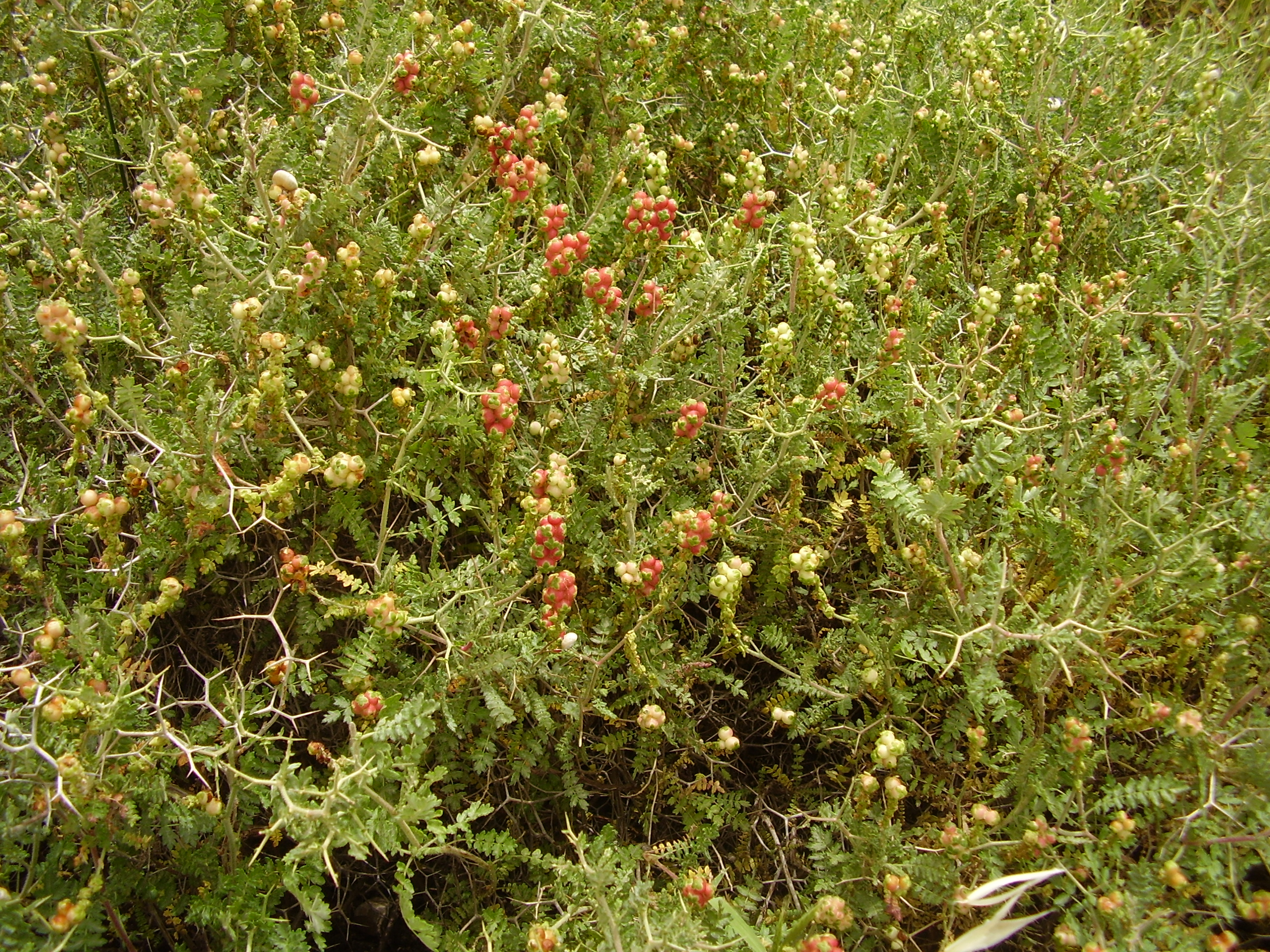
Sarcopoterium spinosum (Rosaceae)

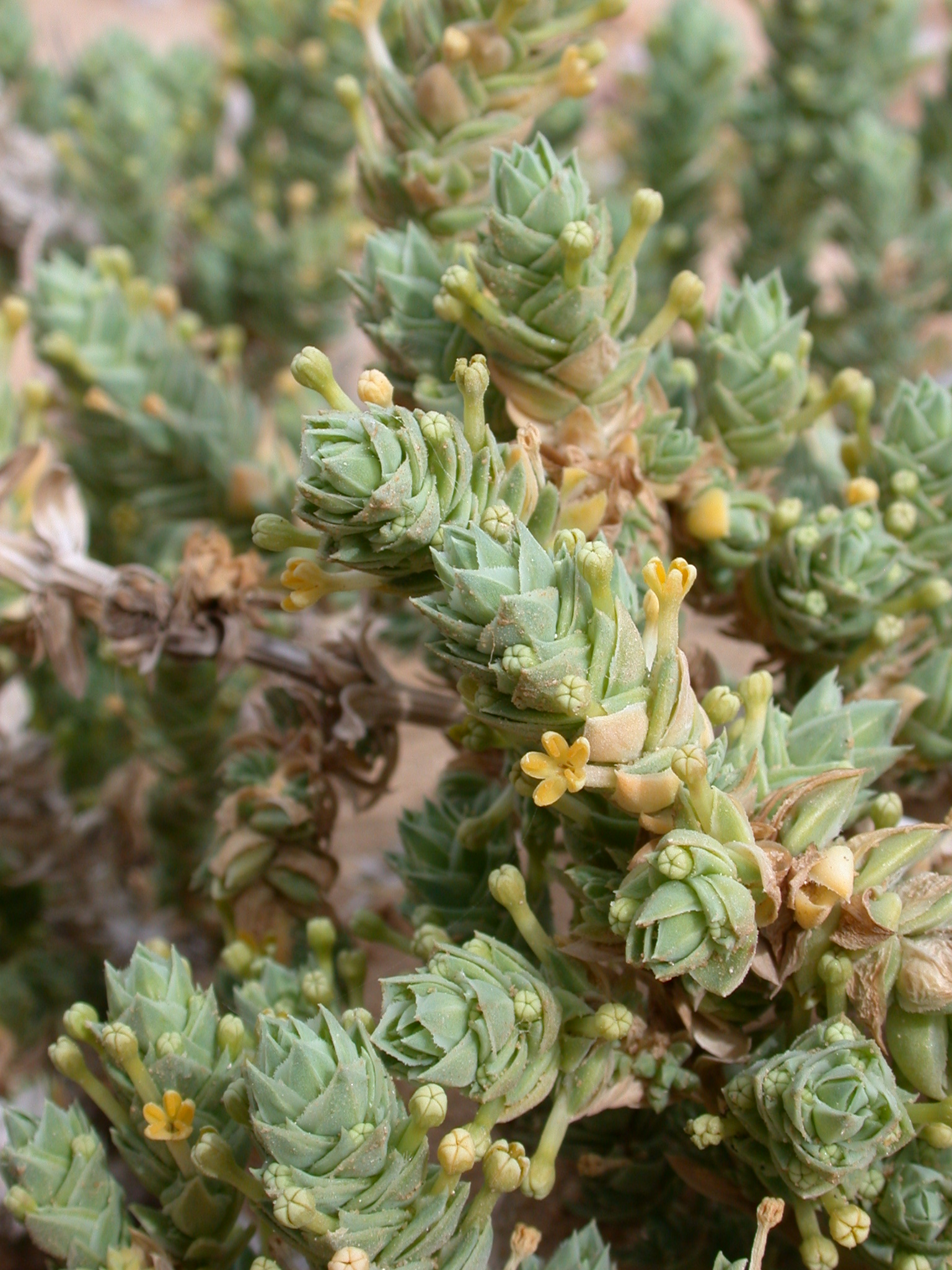
Crucianella maritima (Rubiaceae)

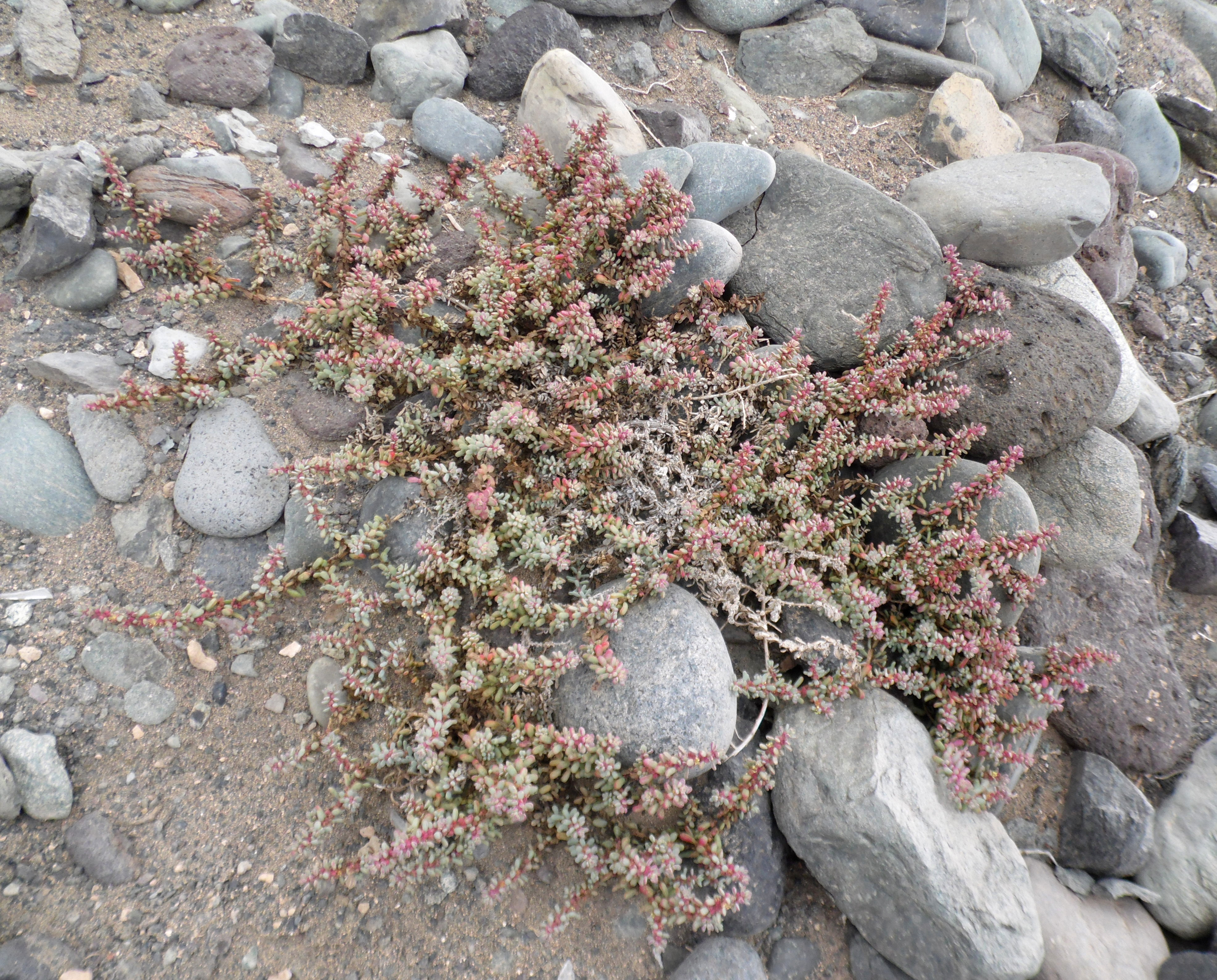
Suaeda vermiculata (Amaranthaceae)

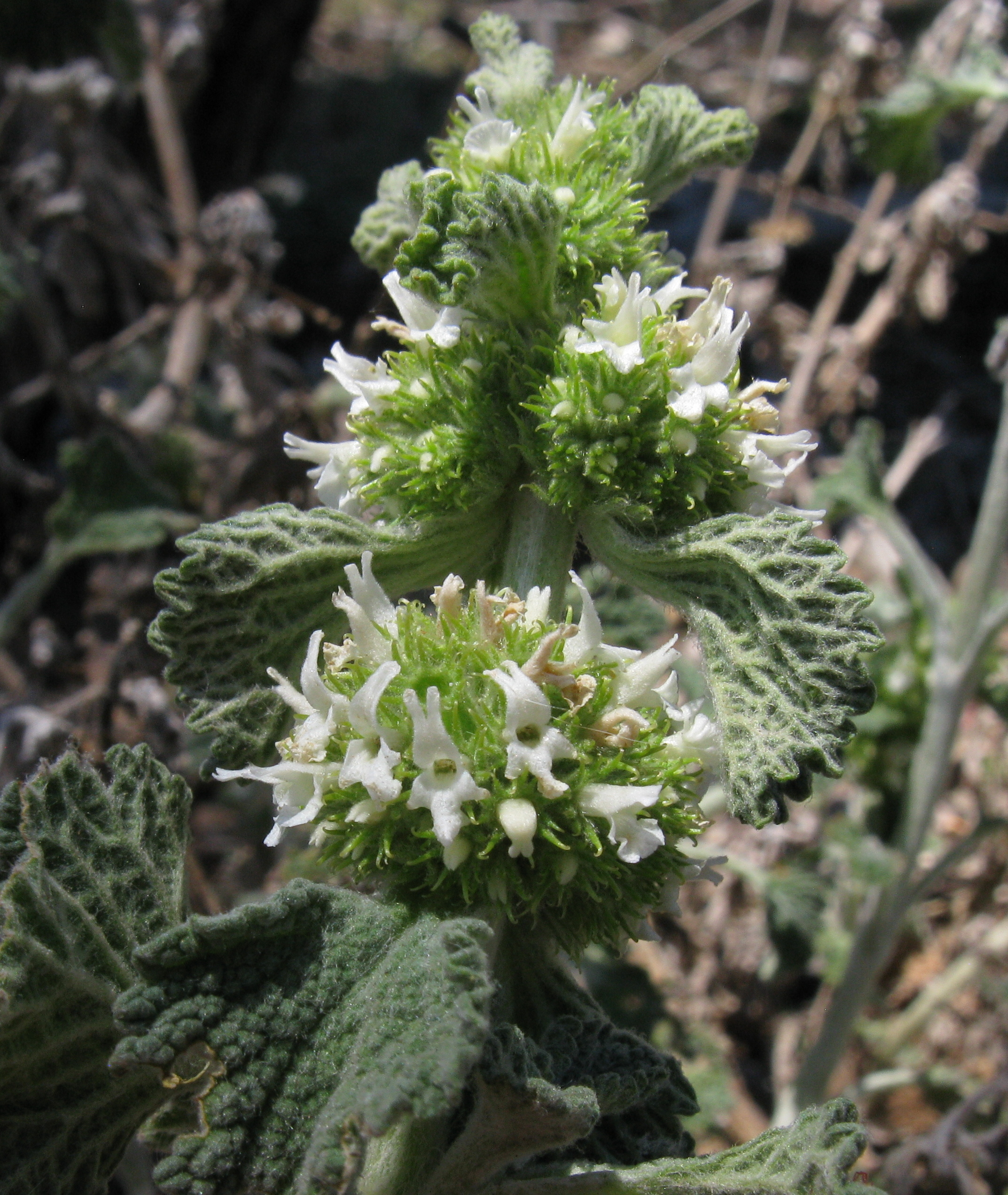
Marrubium vulgare (Lamiaceae)

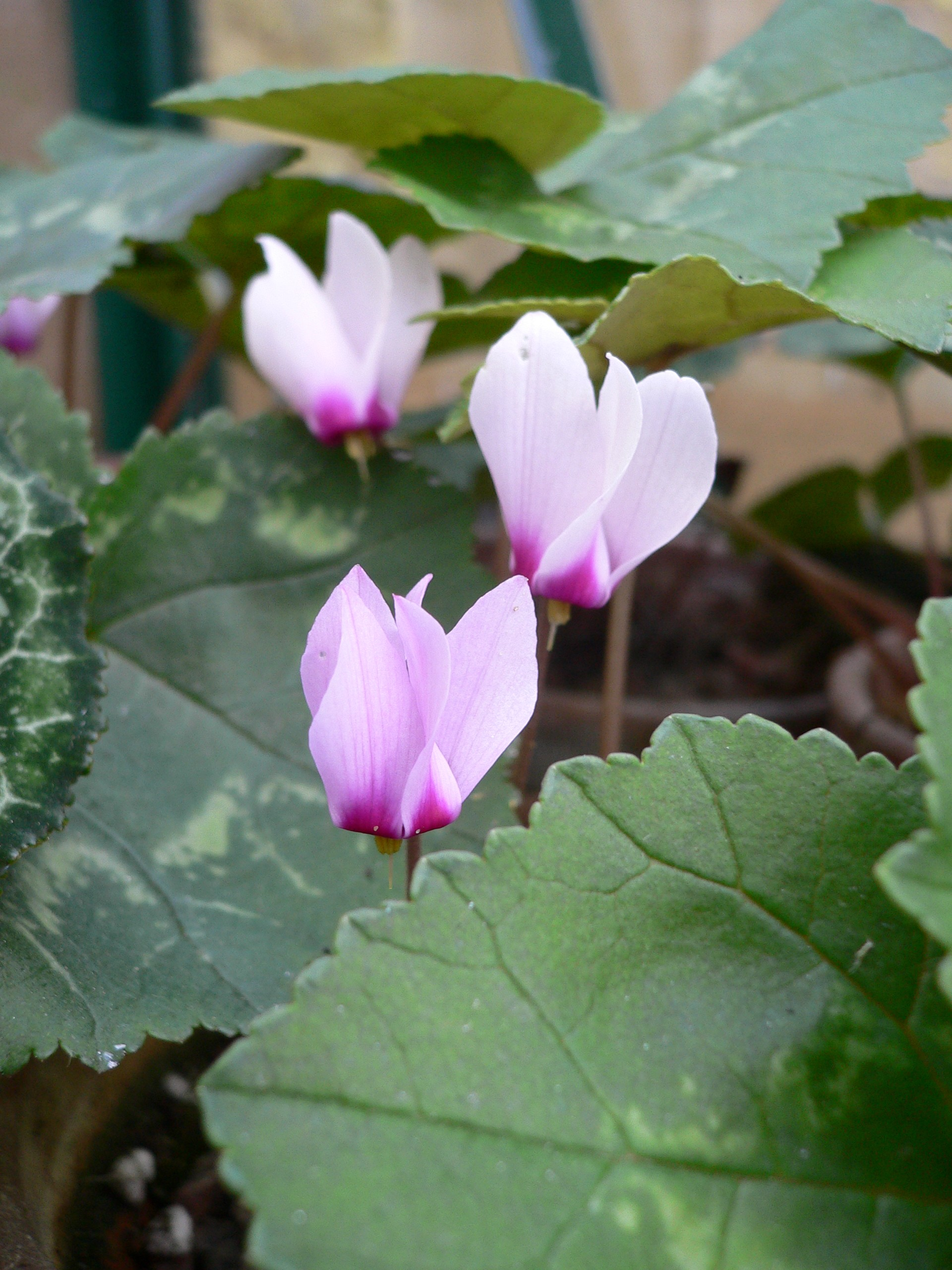
Cyclamen rohlfsianum (Myrsinaceae). Endemic species

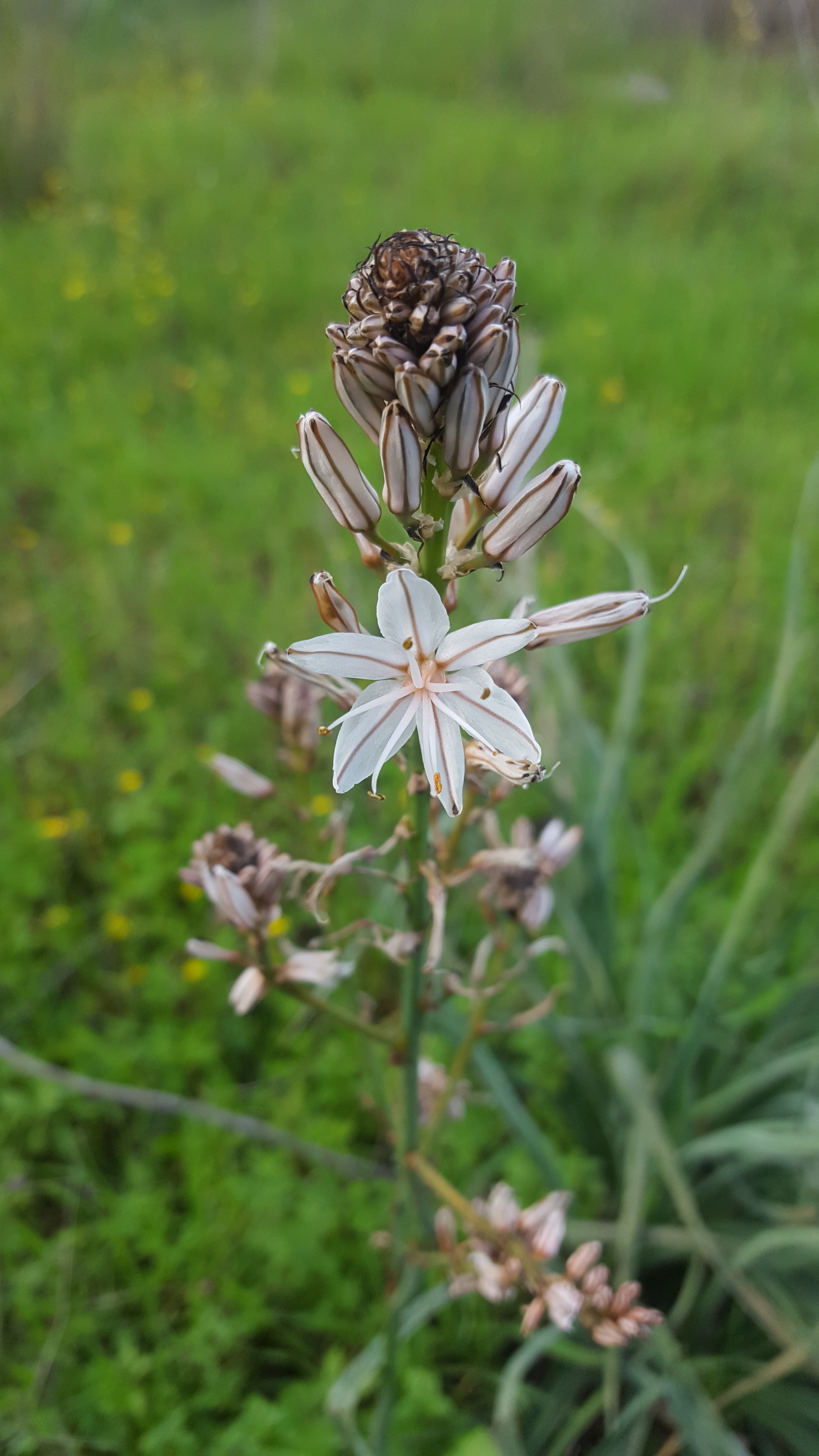
Asphodelus ramosus (Asphodelaceae)

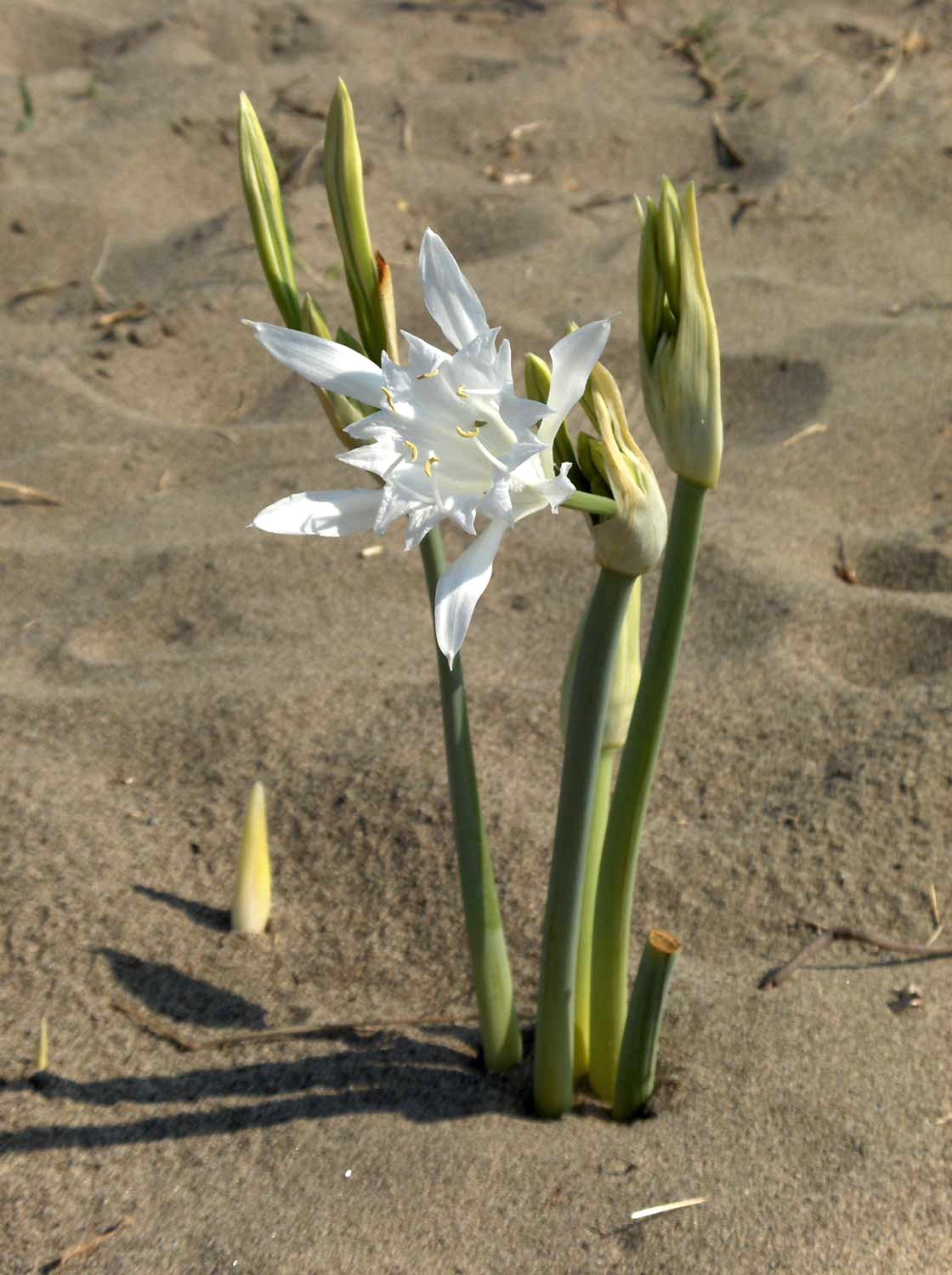
Pancratium maritimum (Amaryllidaceae)

=== Fauna ===
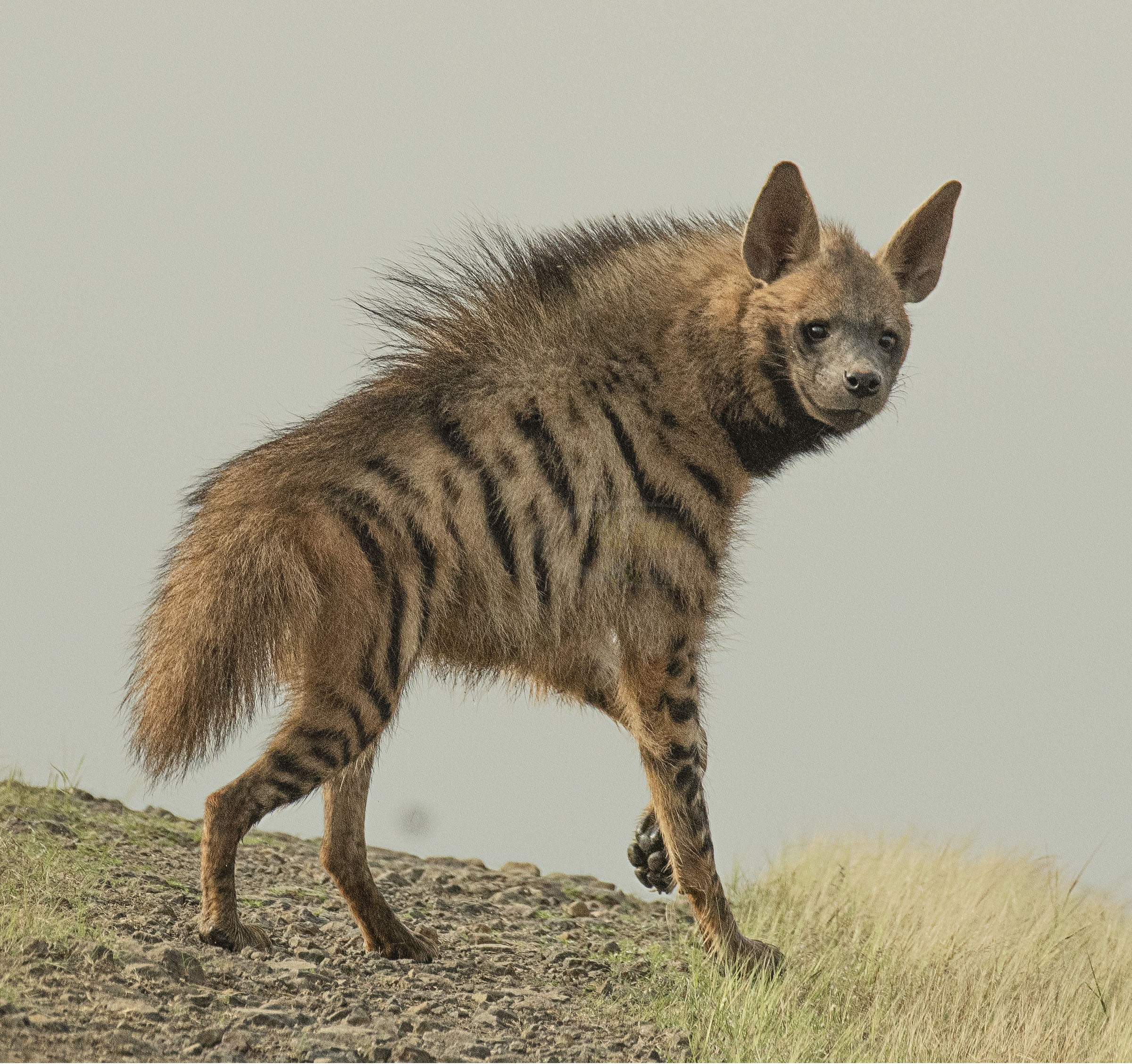
Striped hyena (Hyaena hyaena)

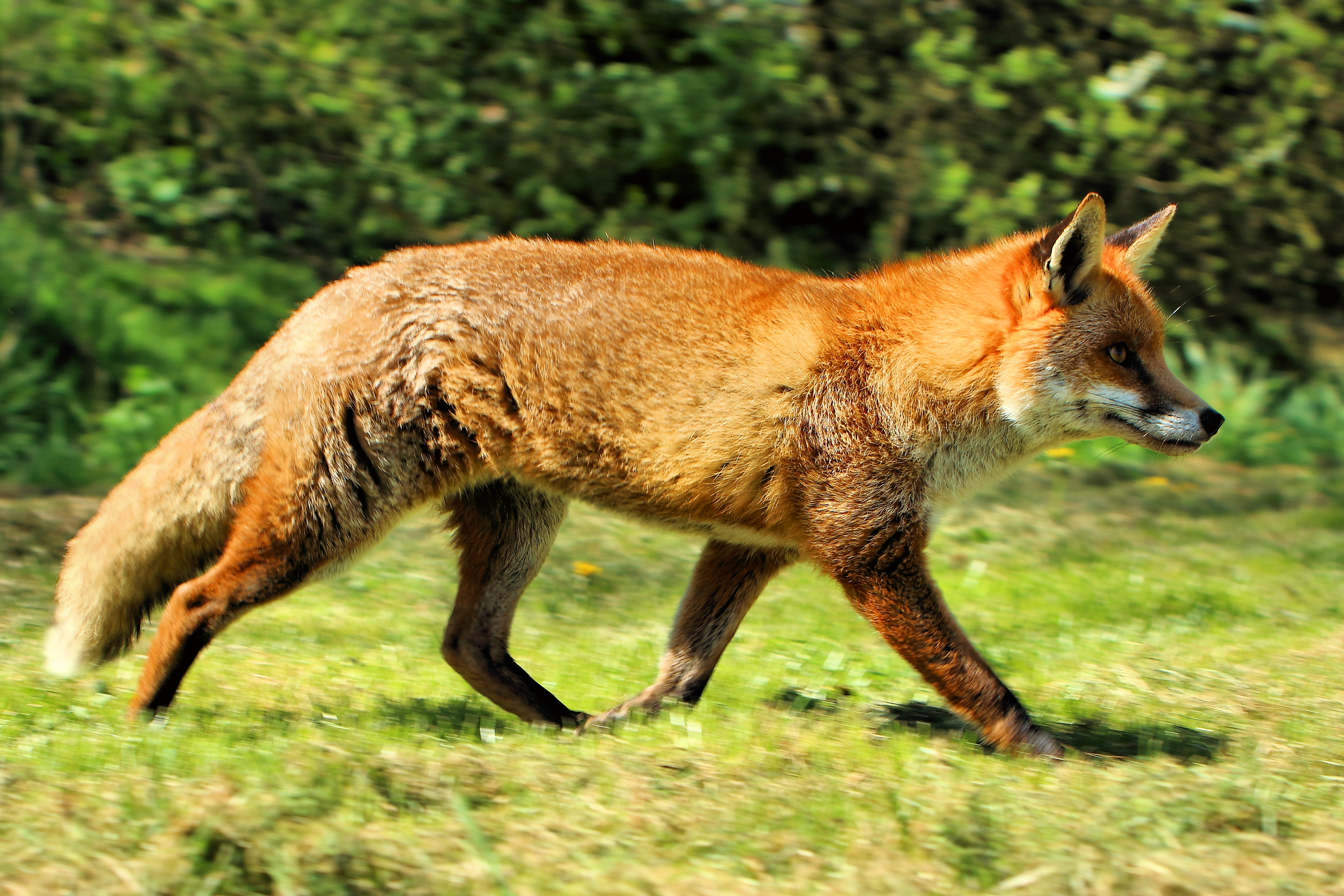
Red fox (Vulpes vulpes)

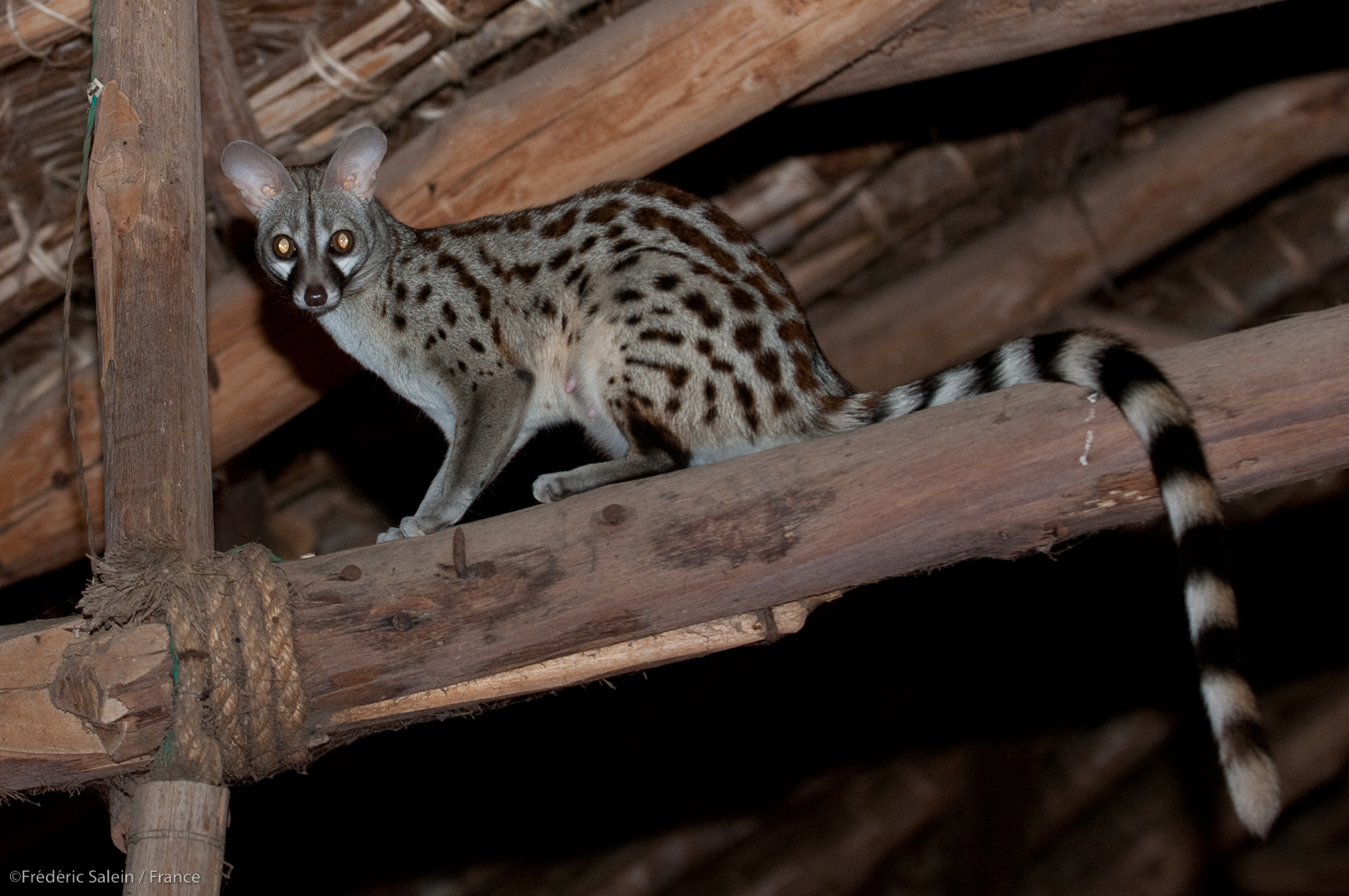
Common genet (Genetta genetta)

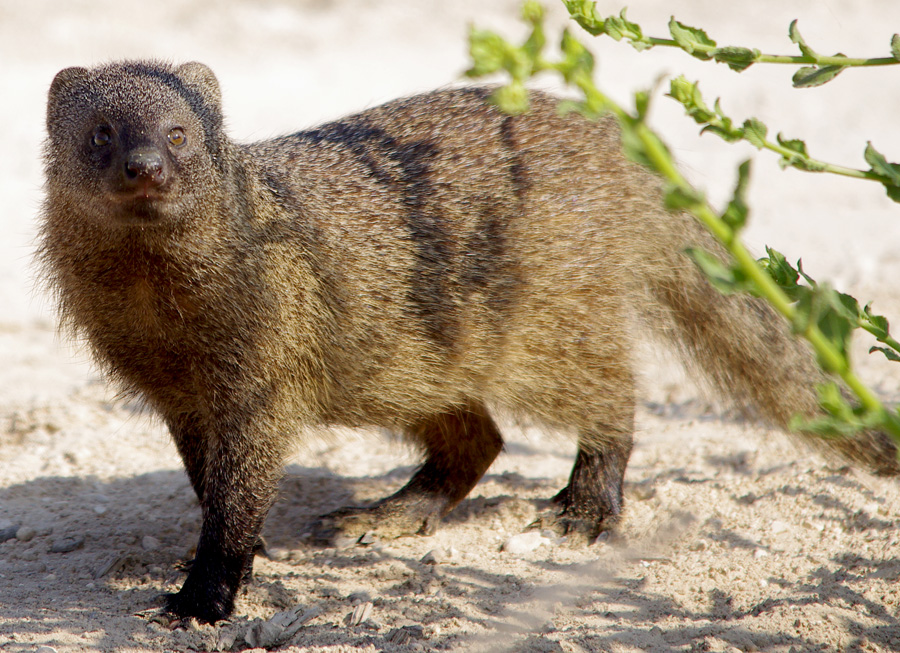
Egyptian mongoose (Herpestes ichneumon)

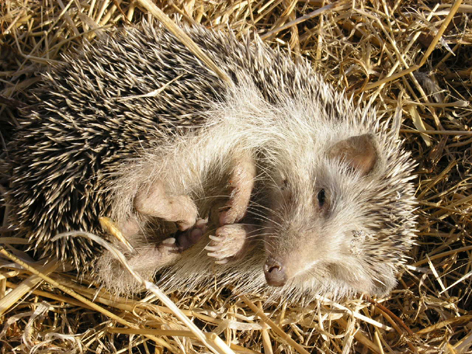
North African hedgehog (Atelerix algirus)

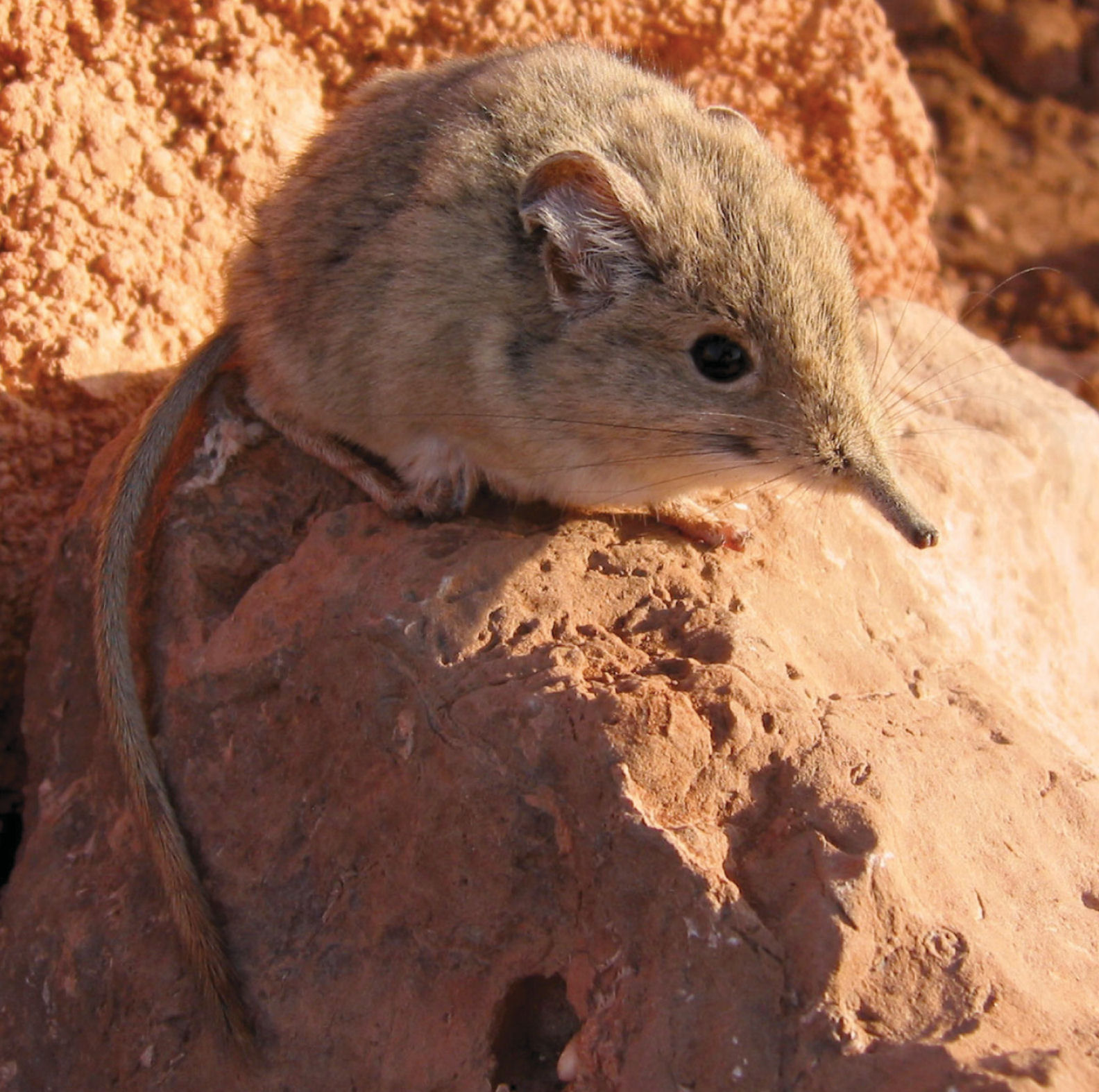
North African elephant shrew (Petrosaltator rozeti)

== See also ==
- Mediterranean dry woodlands and steppe – lower elevations
- Mediterranean woodlands and forests – higher elevations
