= Cyprium =

Cyprium may refer to:

- Copper, an element with the Latin name cuprum
- Cyclamen cyprium, a cyclamen that is endemic to the island of Cyprus
