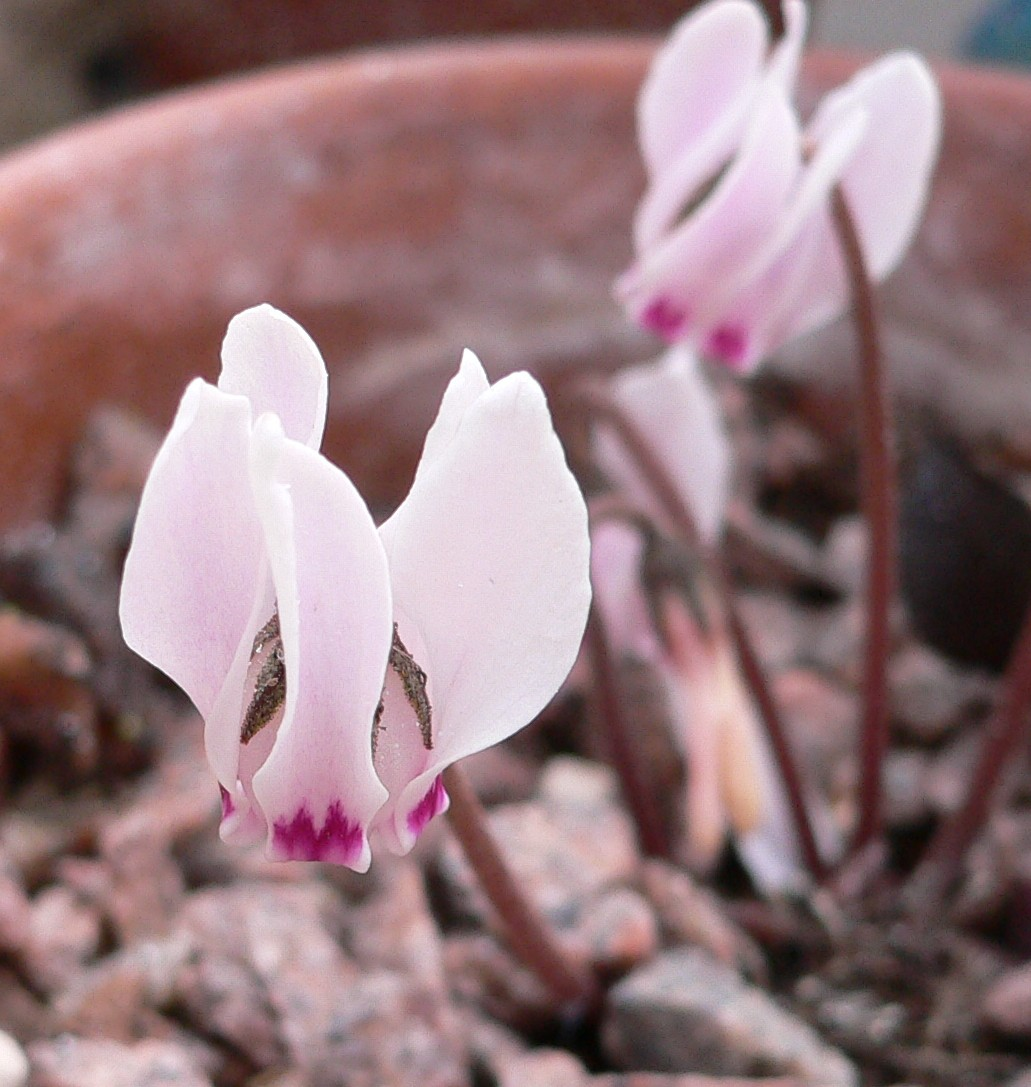

Scientific classification
- Kingdom: Plantae
- Clade: Tracheophytes
- Clade: Angiosperms
- Clade: Eudicots
- Clade: Asterids
- Order: Ericales
- Family: Primulaceae
- Genus: Cyclamen
- Subgenus: C. subg. Gyrophoebe
- Species: C. cyprium

Binomial name
- Cyclamen cyprium Kotschy

= Cyclamen cyprium =

Species of flowering plant

Cyclamen cyprium (Cyprus cyclamen) is a species of flowering plant in the family Primulaceae. It is a perennial growing from a tuber, native to woodland at 300–1,200 m (980–3,940 ft) elevation in the mountains of Cyprus. It is the national flower. Cyclamen persicum and Cyclamen graecum are also found on Cyprus, but are not endemic.

== Description ==
Leaves are heart-shaped with coarsely toothed edges, green variegated with blotches of silver above and purple beneath.

Flowers bloom in autumn to winter, and have 5 upswept petals, white to pale pink with a magenta blotch near the nose. The bases of the petals curve outwards into auricles.

After pollination, flower stems curl, and seeds are borne in round pods, opening by 5 flaps when mature.

Cyclamen ×wellensiekii Iets. is a hybrid obtained in 1969 in the Netherlands between this species and Cyclamen libanoticum – another species of sub-genus Gyrophoebe. This fertile hybrid has pink flowers from November until March.

== Gallery ==
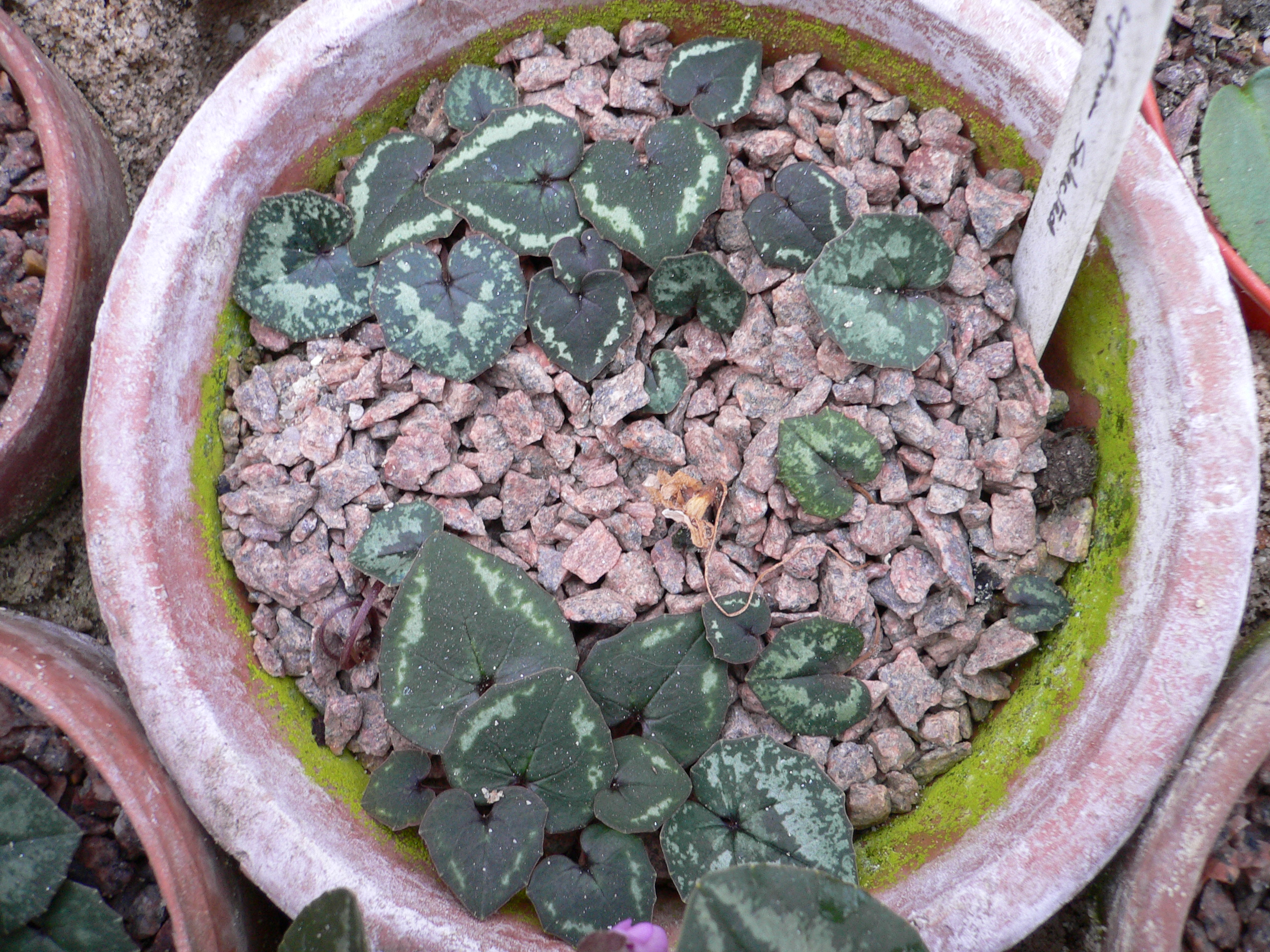
leaves
