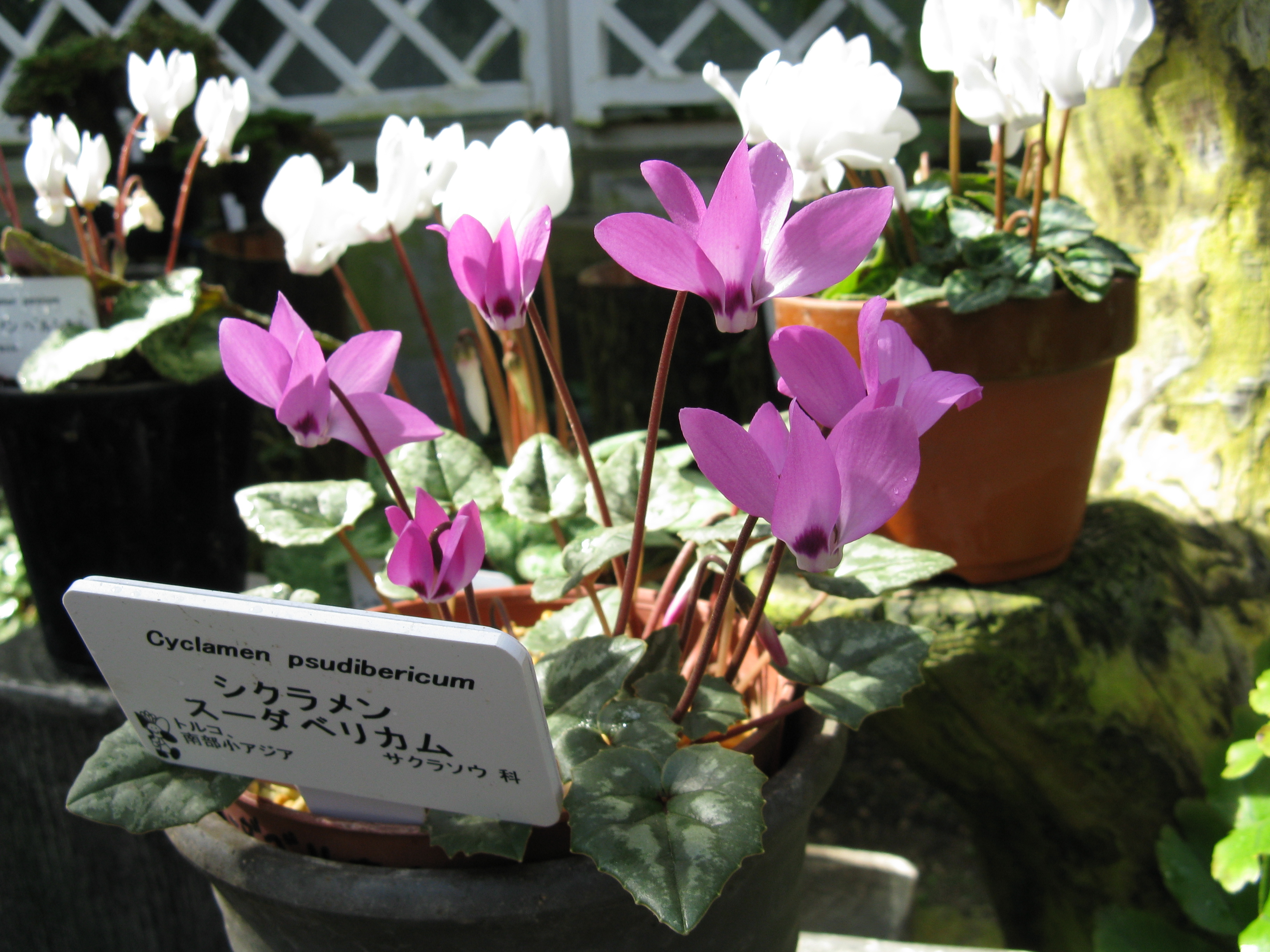
- Cyclamen pseudibericum f. pseudibericum in cultivation
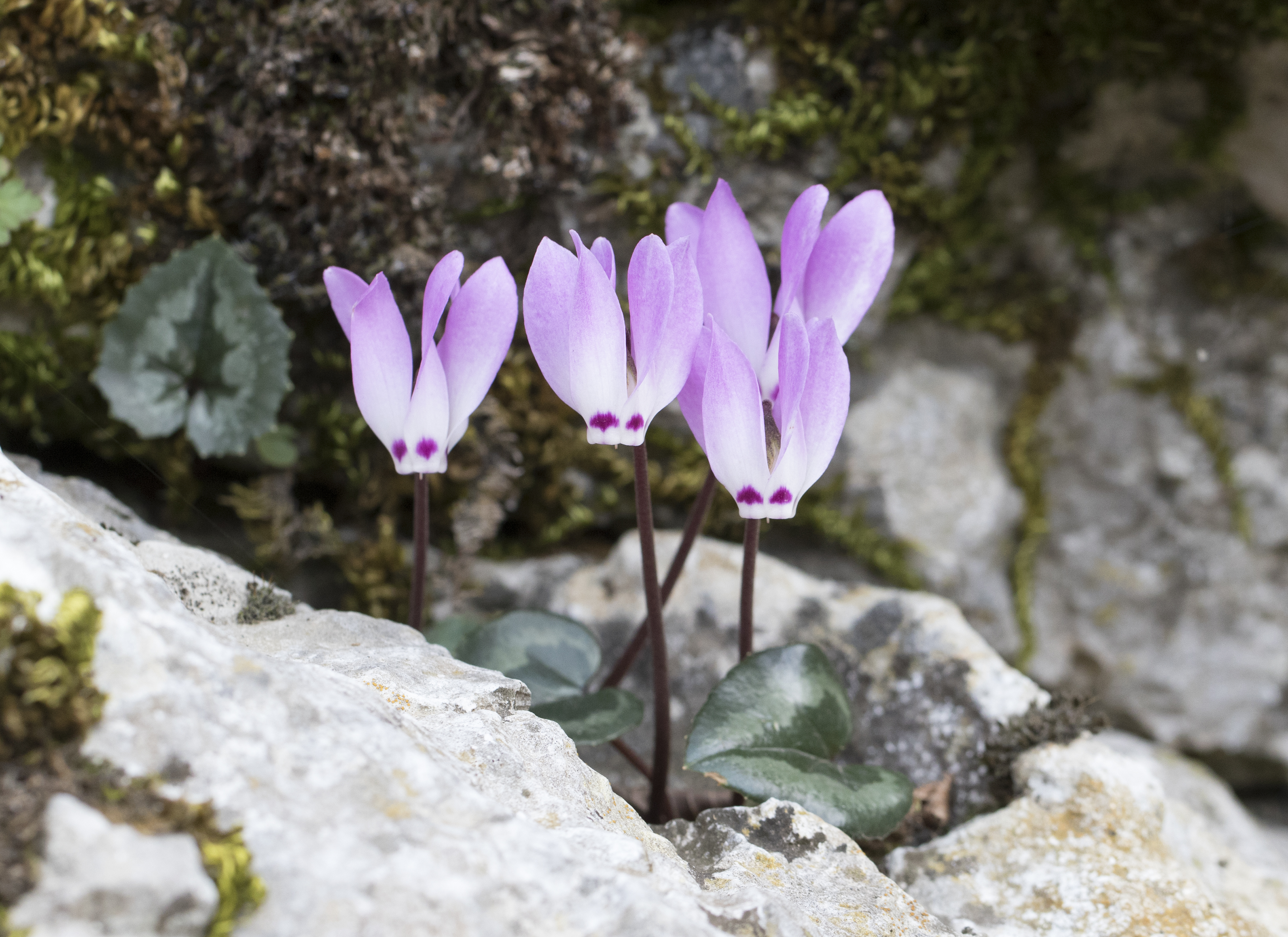
- Cyclamen pseudibericum f. roseum in the wild

Scientific classification
- Kingdom: Plantae
- Clade: Tracheophytes
- Clade: Angiosperms
- Clade: Eudicots
- Clade: Asterids
- Order: Ericales
- Family: Primulaceae
- Genus: Cyclamen
- Subgenus: C. subg. Gyrophoebe
- Species: C. pseudibericum

Binomial name
- Cyclamen pseudibericum Hildebr.

= Cyclamen pseudibericum =

Species of flowering plant

Cyclamen pseudibericum (incorrectly spelled pseudoibericum), the false Iberian cyclamen, is a species of flowering plant in the genus Cyclamen of the family Primulaceae, native to the Amanus or Nur and Anti-Taurus Mountains in southern Turkey. It is an herbaceous, tuberous perennial growing to 12 cm (5 in). It is similar to Cyclamen coum, but with longer petals.

== Description ==
The tuber develops roots from the center below. The leaves are longer than wide, with a hastate or Christmas-tree pattern in green and silver. The spring-blooming flowers with five reflexed, upswept petals, are fragrant and magenta-purple or pink, with a darker blotch and a white zone at the end of the nose (larger than that of C. coum). After flowering, a pod develops on a coiled stem that rests on the ground, releasing its seeds directly on to the soil surface.

This plant has gained the Royal Horticultural Society's Award of Garden Merit (confirmed 2017).

== Subdivisions ==
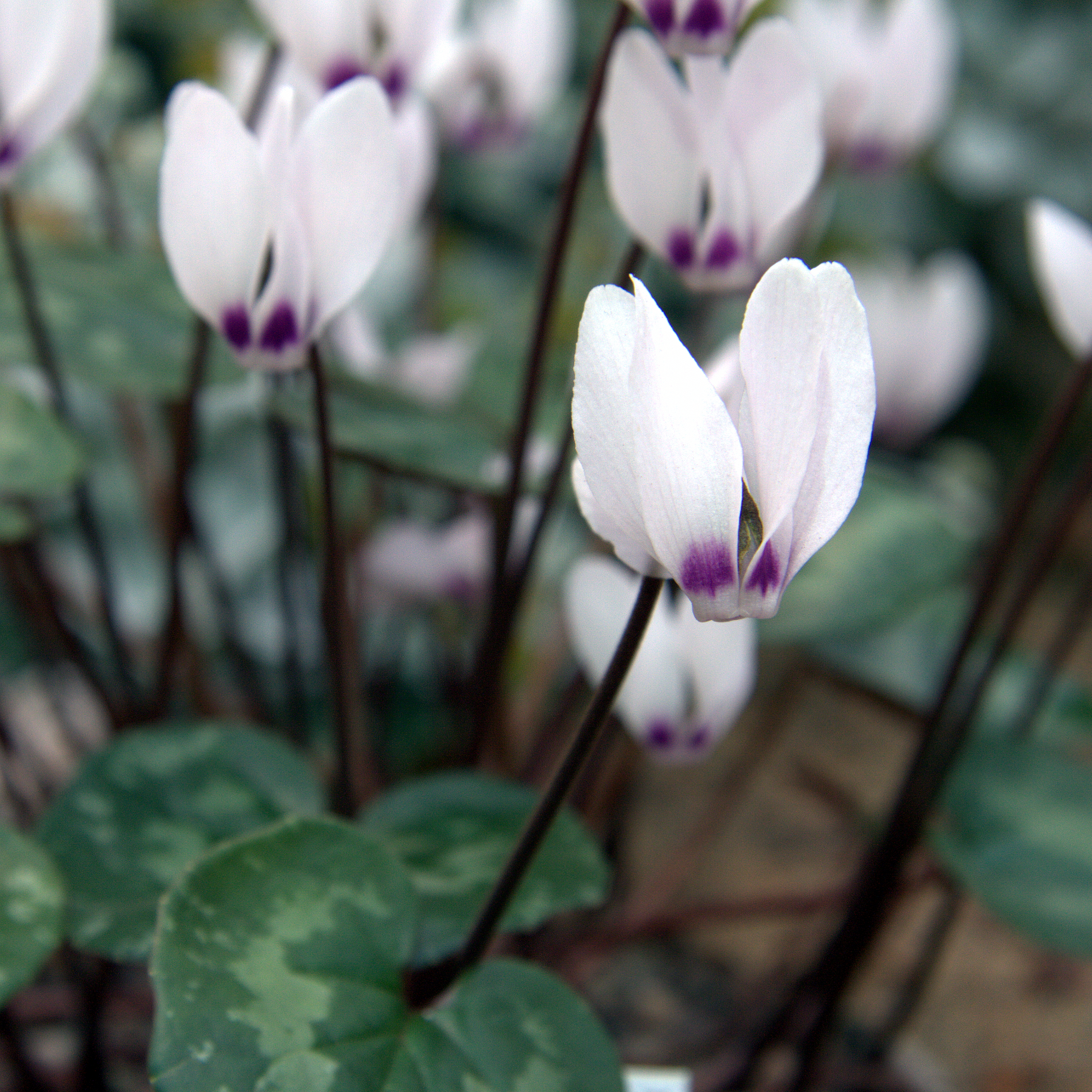
Cyclamen pseudibericum f. roseum in the botanical garden of Göteborg

=== Forms ===
There are two naturally occurring forms, distinguished by predominant flower color. C. pseudibericum f. pseudibericum is magenta-purple and C. pseudibericum f. roseum is light pink to nearly white.

=== Hybrids ===
Cyclamen × schwarzii Grey-Wilson is a fertile hybrid of Cyclamen pseudibericum × Cyclamen libanoticum. This hybrid can cross back with one of the parents. According to Grey-Wilson some very pale forms of C. pseudibericum f. roseum could actually be C. ×schwarzii or a back-cross of it.

== In cultivation ==
Cyclamen pseudibericum blooms from January to March. It is moderately hardy and should therefore be planted preferably in a sheltered place or in cold greenhouse.

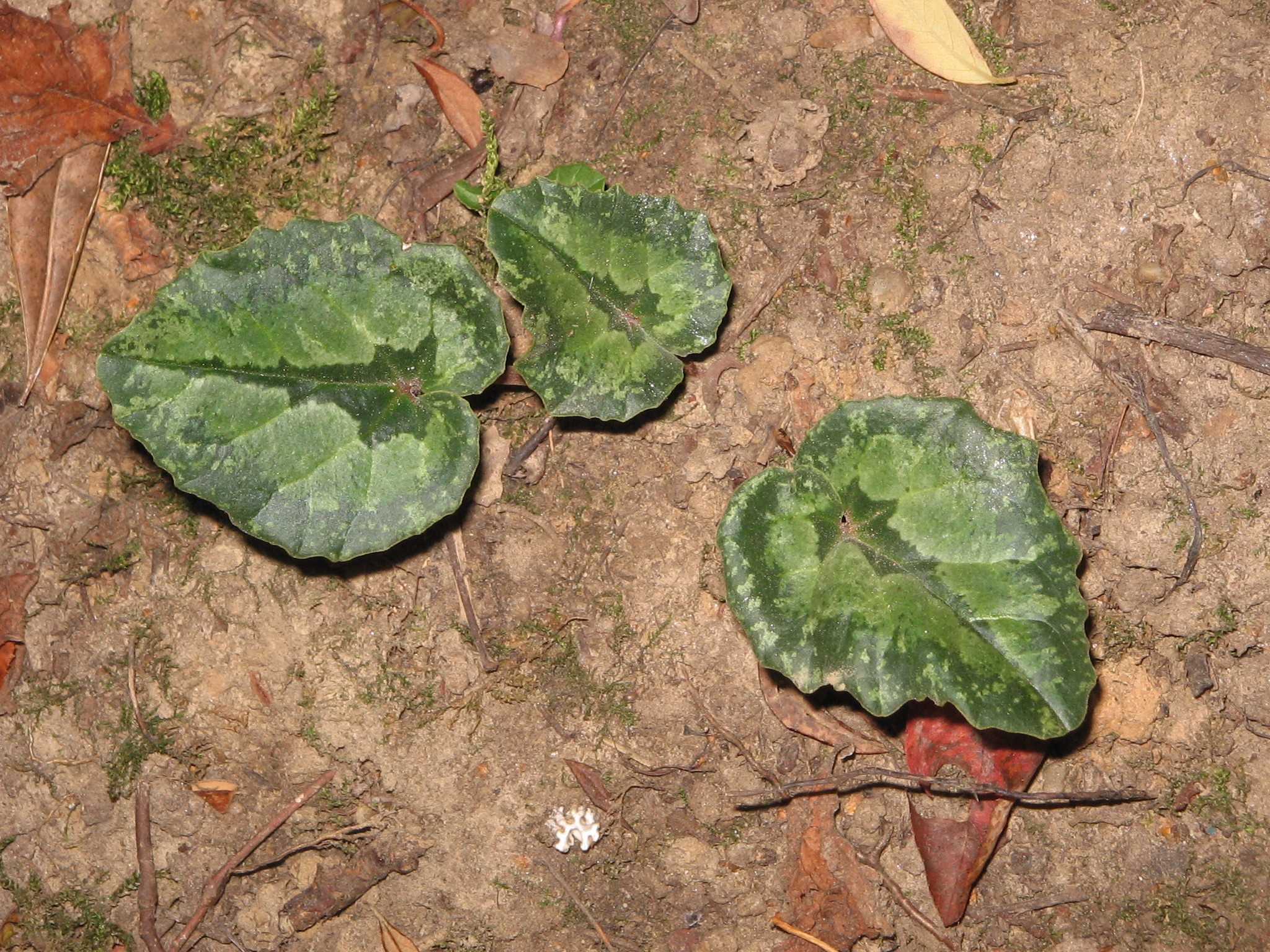
Young leaf in autumn

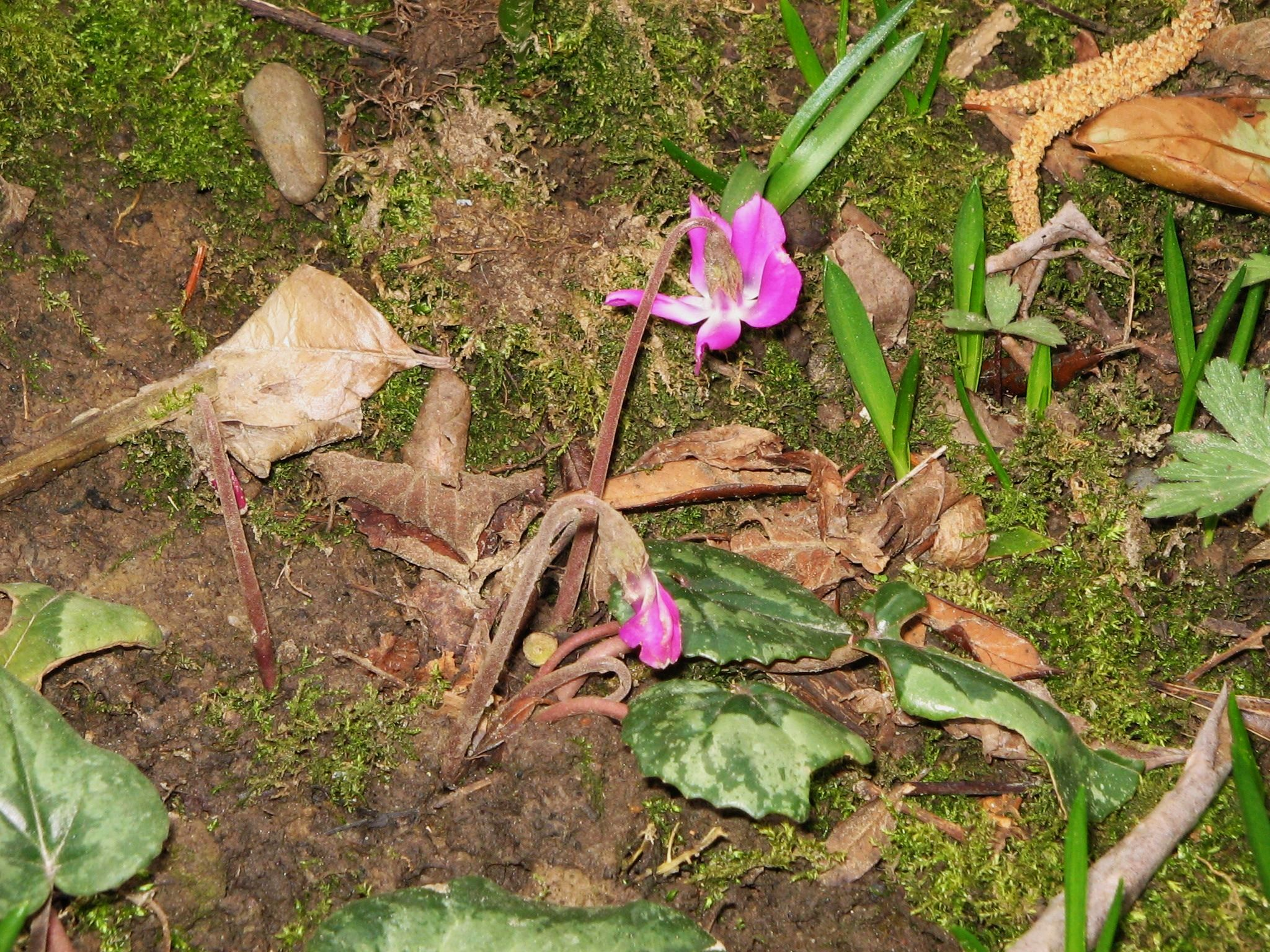
Opening of the flowers

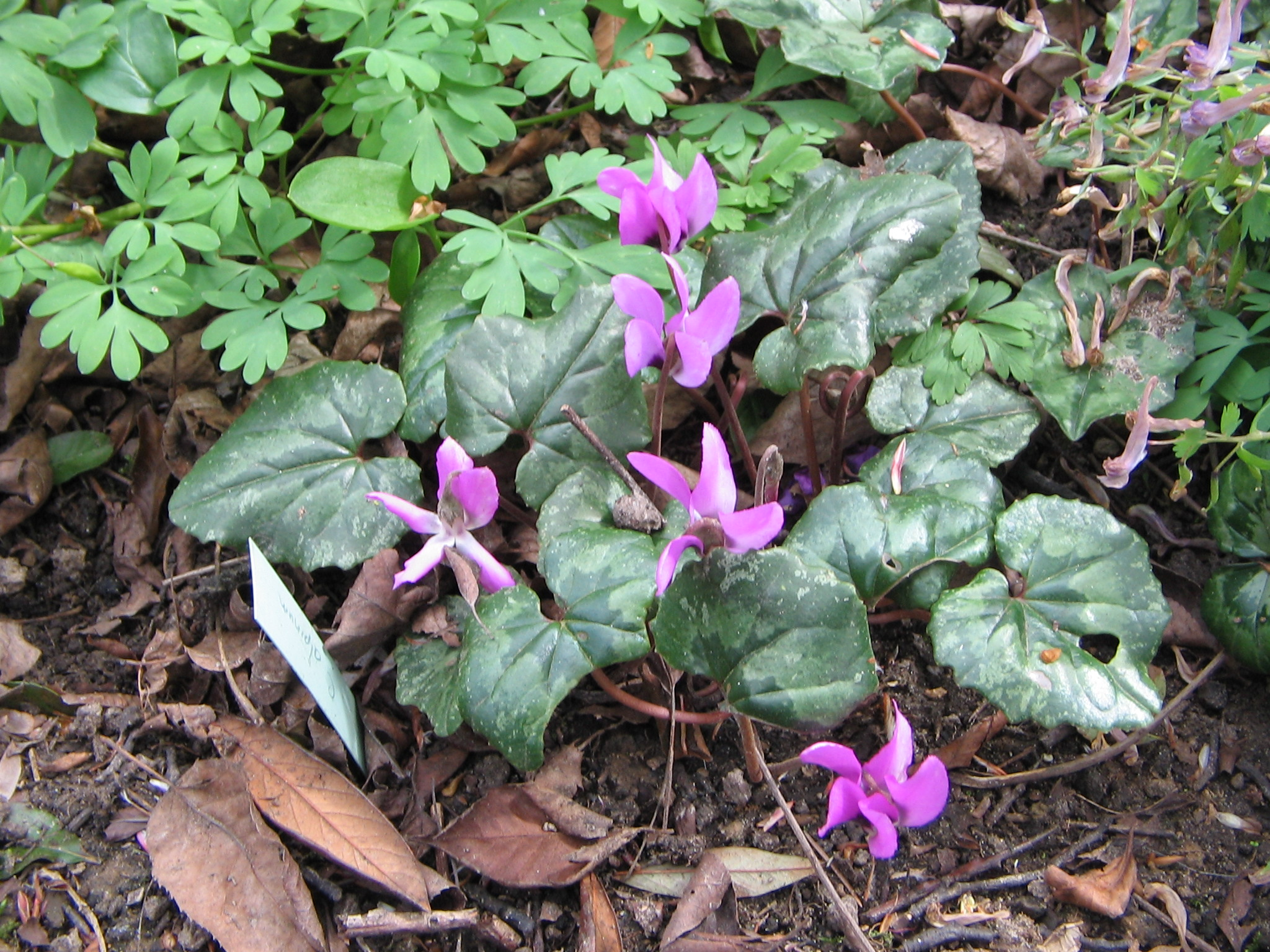
In blossom

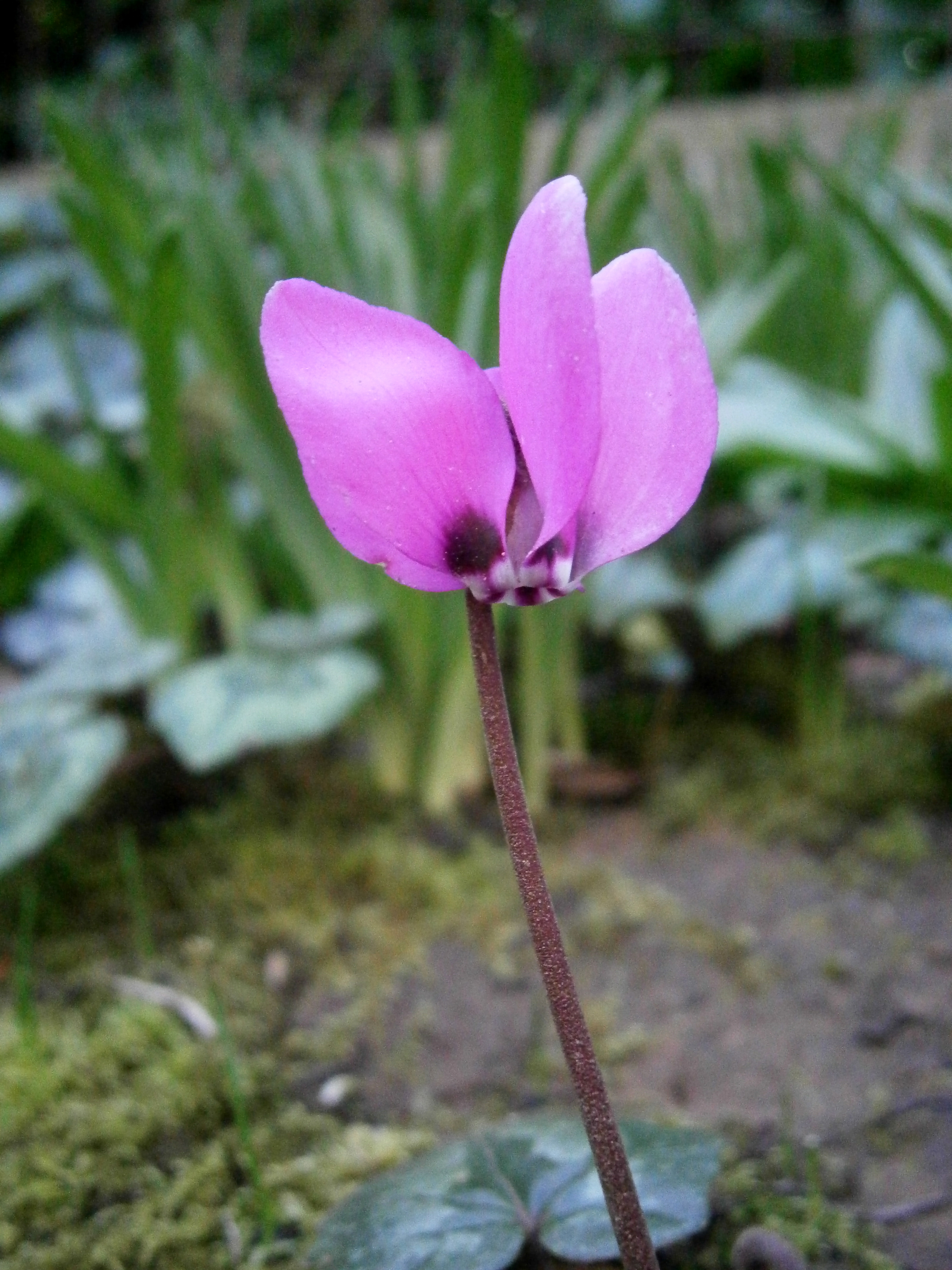
Close-up of flower

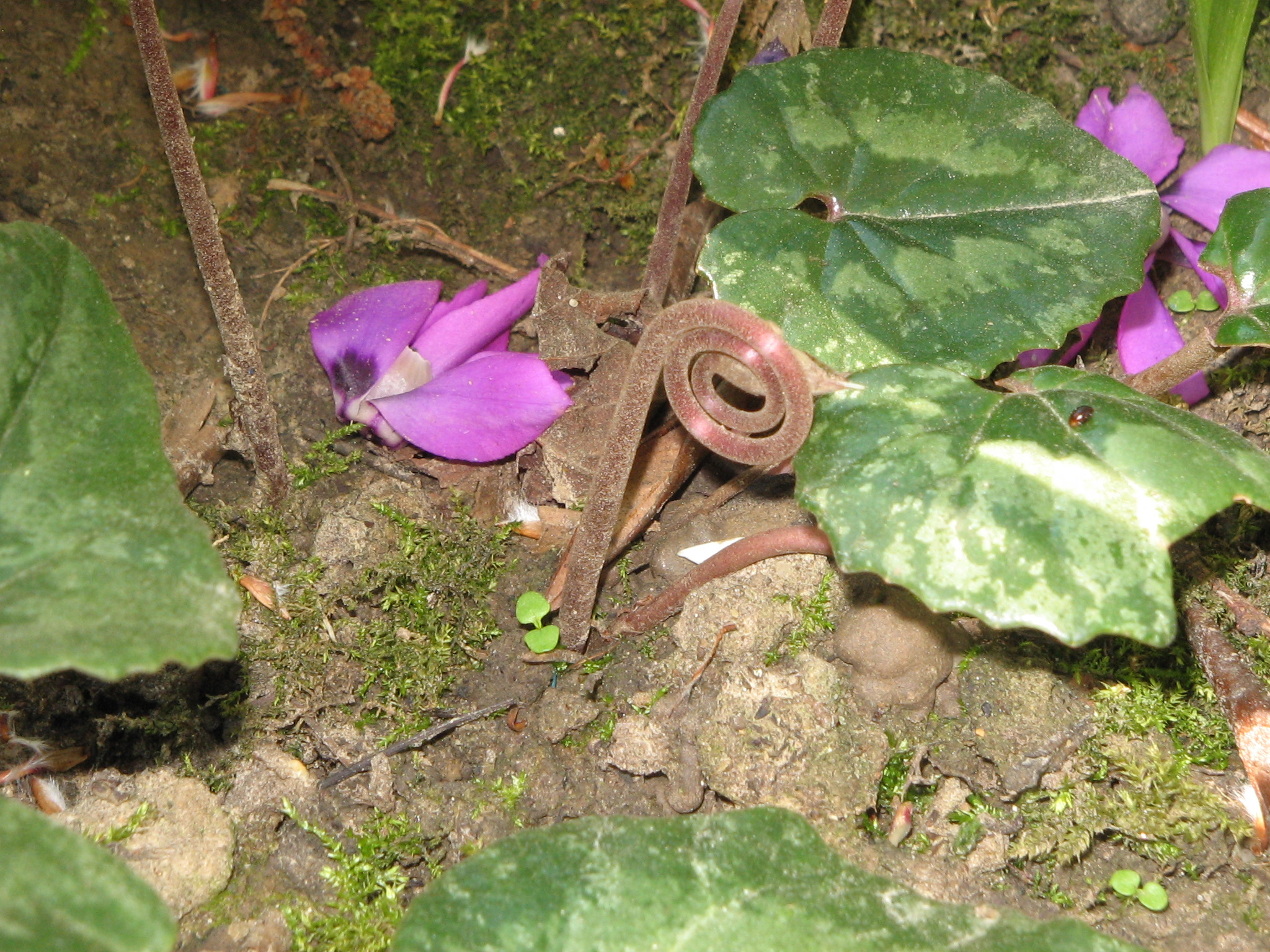
Convoluting after pollination
