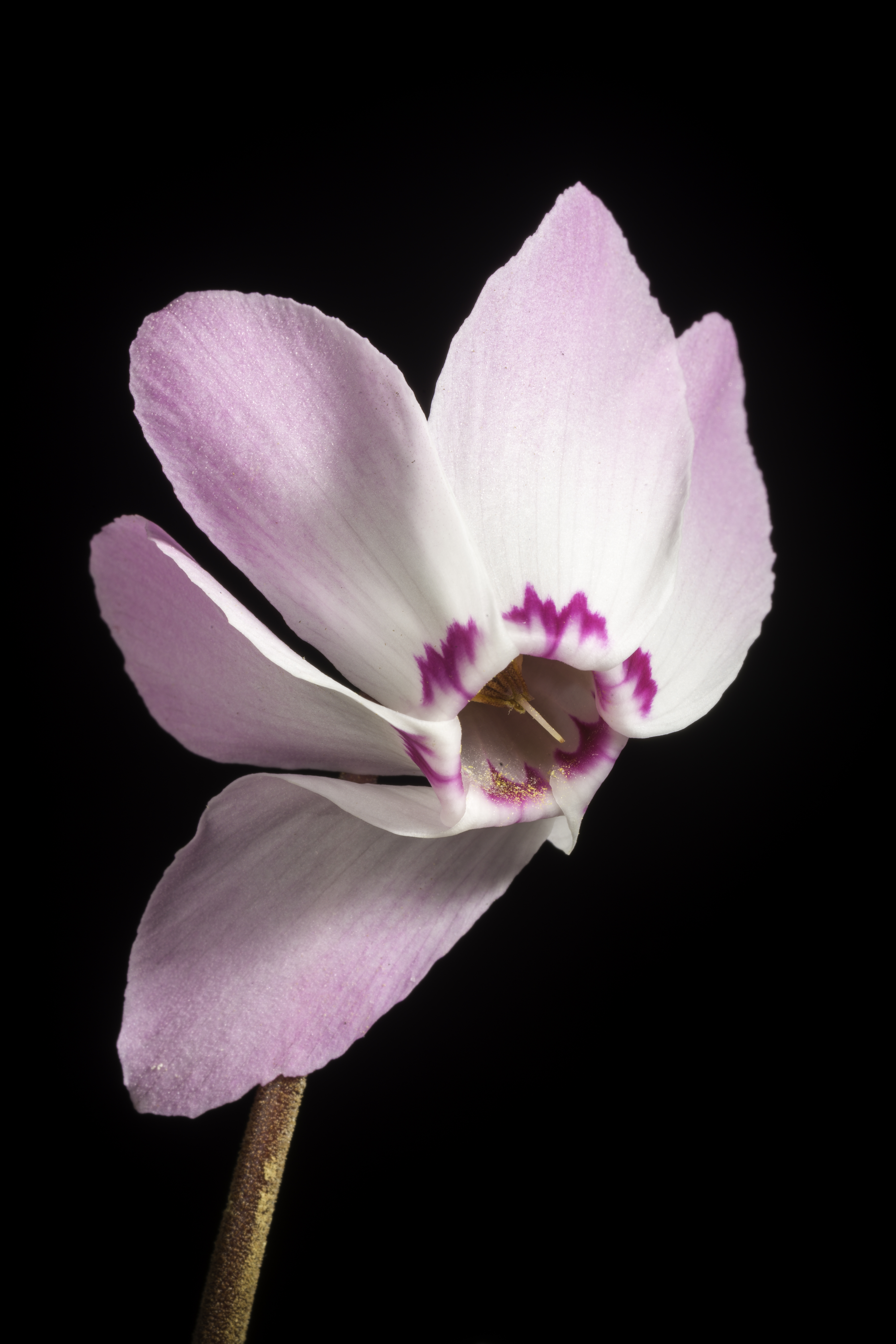

Conservation status
- Endangered (IUCN 3.1)

Scientific classification
- Kingdom: Plantae
- Clade: Tracheophytes
- Clade: Angiosperms
- Clade: Eudicots
- Clade: Asterids
- Order: Ericales
- Family: Primulaceae
- Genus: Cyclamen
- Subgenus: C. subg. Gyrophoebe
- Species: C. libanoticum

Binomial name
- Cyclamen libanoticum Hildebr.

= Cyclamen libanoticum =

Species of flowering plant

Cyclamen libanoticum, commonly known as the Lebanon cyclamen or Lebanese sowbread, is a species of perennial, tuberous geophyte in the family Primulaceae. It is a narrow endemic species native to a highly localized mountainous zone within Lebanon. Due to its restricted natural range and vulnerability to anthropogenic disturbances, it is classified as an Endangered species.

== Taxonomy and history ==
The species was first documented and scientifically described in 1898 by the German botanist Friedrich Hermann Gustav Hildebrand in the journal Botanische Jahrbücher für Systematik, Pflanzengeschichte und Pflanzengeographie. Following its initial collection, the exact wild populations remained unverified by modern botanists for several decades, leading to fears that the species had become extinct in nature until its formal rediscovery in the mid-20th century.

Cyclamen libanoticum is placed within the Cyclamen subgenus Gyrophoebe. In cultivation, the species is genetically compatible with related taxa of the same subgenus, with several fertile hybrids:

- Cyclamen × wellensiekii Iets. (1974) – a hybrid obtained in 1969 in the Netherlands resulting from a cross with Cyclamen cyprium.
- Cyclamen × schwarzii Grey-Wilson – a fertile hybrid resulting from a cross with Cyclamen pseudibericum.

The specific epithet libanoticum is a geographical descriptor directly attributing its origin to the country of Lebanon.

== Description ==
Cyclamen libanoticum is a small, compact geophyte reaching a standard height of 10 to 15 cm (3.9 to 5.9 in). The tuber is a compressed-spherical, and grows up to 5 cm (2.0 in) in diameter; its smooth surface becomes increasingly rough and fissured with age. The tuber produces thin roots (approximately 0.5 mm in thickness) arising strictly from a single area on its lower side or central base.

The foliage emerges in late autumn and reaches full maturation by mid-winter. The leaves are heart-shaped (cordate), measuring 7–12 cm long by 5–10 cm wide, with entire to slightly wavy (undulate) margins that occasionally display minute teeth. The upper leaf surface features a dark gray-green coloration accented by a pale green or silvery arrowhead pattern, while the lower surface is of a deep purple hue.

The blooming period occurs from late February through early April. The solitary flowers are notable for their strong, spicy, peppery scent. Each flower consists of five reflexed, broad corolla lobes that measure 20 to 30 mm in length. The petals open white before maturing into a pale pink hue, accented by a characteristic M-shaped crimson-magenta blotch prominently displayed at the base of each lobe. Following fertilization, the pedicel coils into a circinate (spiral) structure, pulling the developing capsule toward the soil surface to mature by early summer.

== Distribution and habitat ==
The natural distribution of Cyclamen libanoticum is confined to a small geographic range located in the western slopes of Mount Lebanon northeast of Beirut. The primary known populations are concentrated within and immediately around the Jabal Moussa Biosphere Reserve and the valley of the Ibrahim River (Nahr Ibrahim). The species is steno-endemic and grows at heights ranging between 750 and 1,400 m (2,460 and 4,590 ft) above sea level. Its preferred microhabitat is limited to heavily shaded, moist, northern and northwestern-facing slopes. It thrives in pockets of dolomitic limestone cliffs, deep leaf litter, or moss beds under dense undergrowth within deciduous and evergreen oak woodlands.

Cyclamen libanoticum has been officially assessed for the IUCN Red List and is designated as an Endangered (EN) species. This designation is governed by the plant's small extent of occurrence (EOO) and highly fragmented populations. The wild populations face localized ecological pressures. Field tracking has demonstrated that despite parts of its populations residing inside protected biosphere boundaries, the species remains vulnerable to habitat destruction caused by climate-induced wild forest fires. Additionally, populations situated outside the core reserves are threatened by illegal wild gathering for the commercial horticultural trade, road expansions, and localized stone quarrying operations.

== Phytochemistry ==
Analysis of C. libanoticum leaves identified several carotenoids, including neoxanthin, violaxanthin, lutein and β-carotene. The flowers contain anthocyanins including cyanidin 3,5-di-O-glucoside and peonidin derivatives.

== Gallery ==
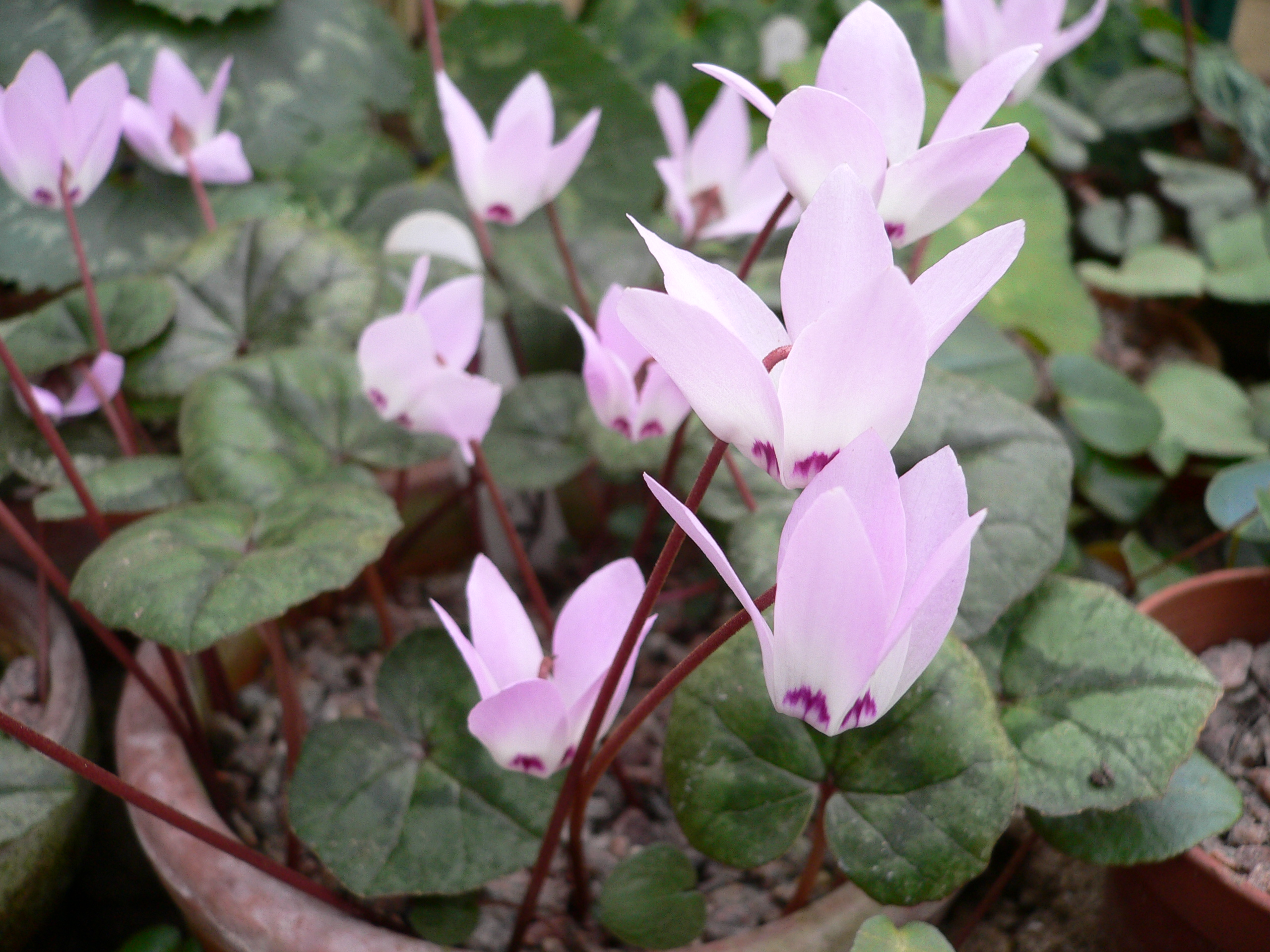
Pots of Lebanon cyclamen

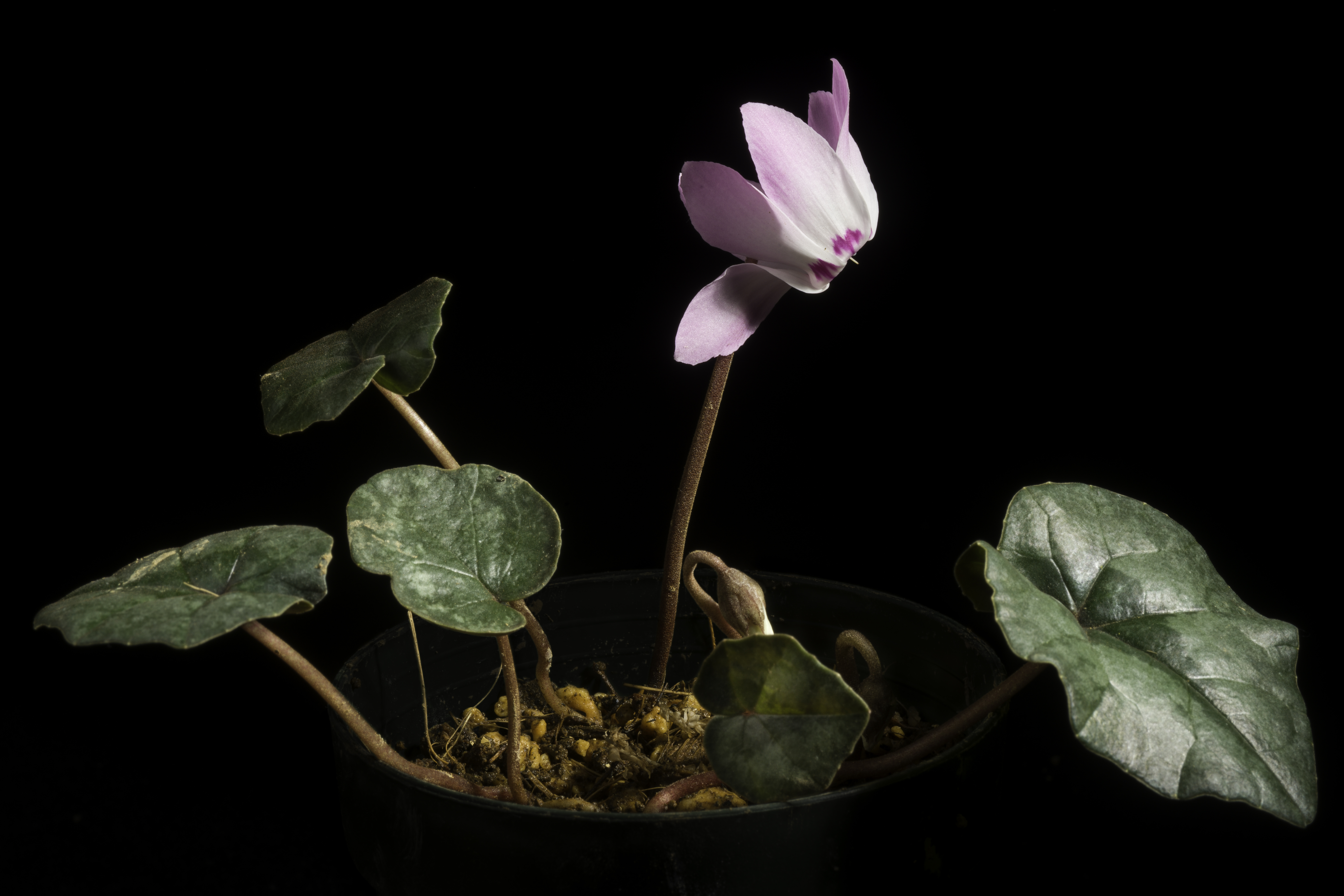
Lebanon cyclamen with foliage

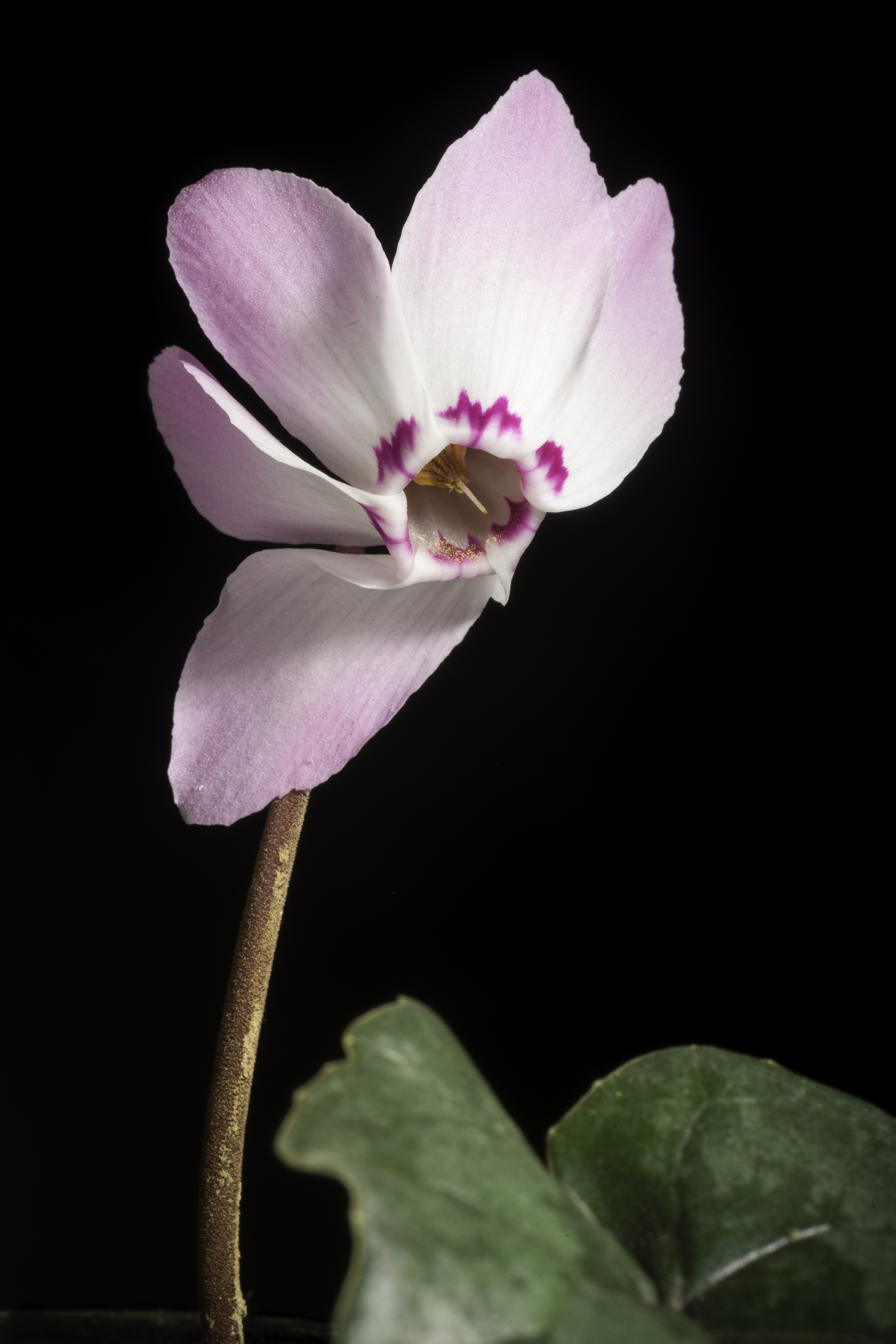
Close-up of flower

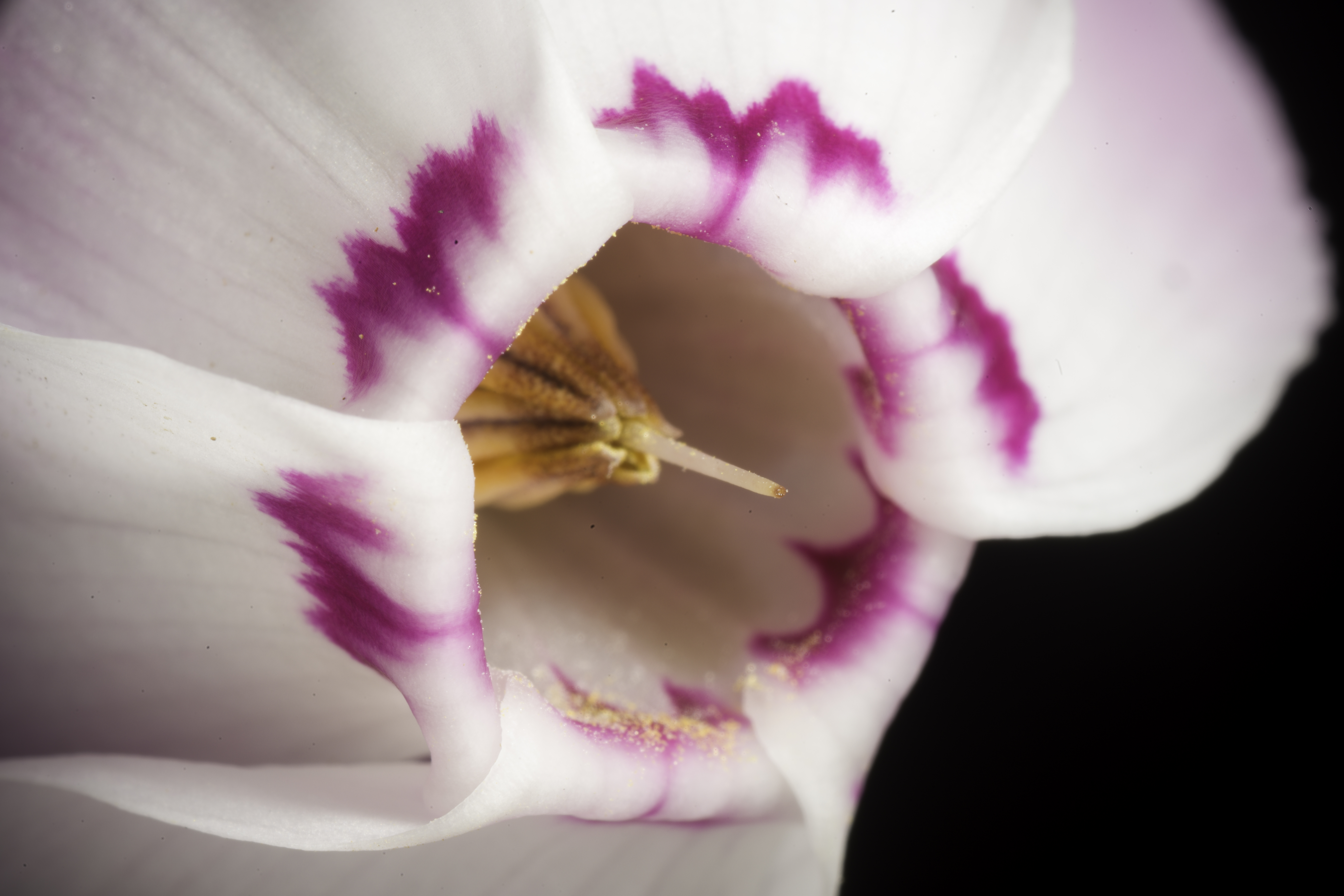
Flower pattern

== See also ==
- Flora of Lebanon
