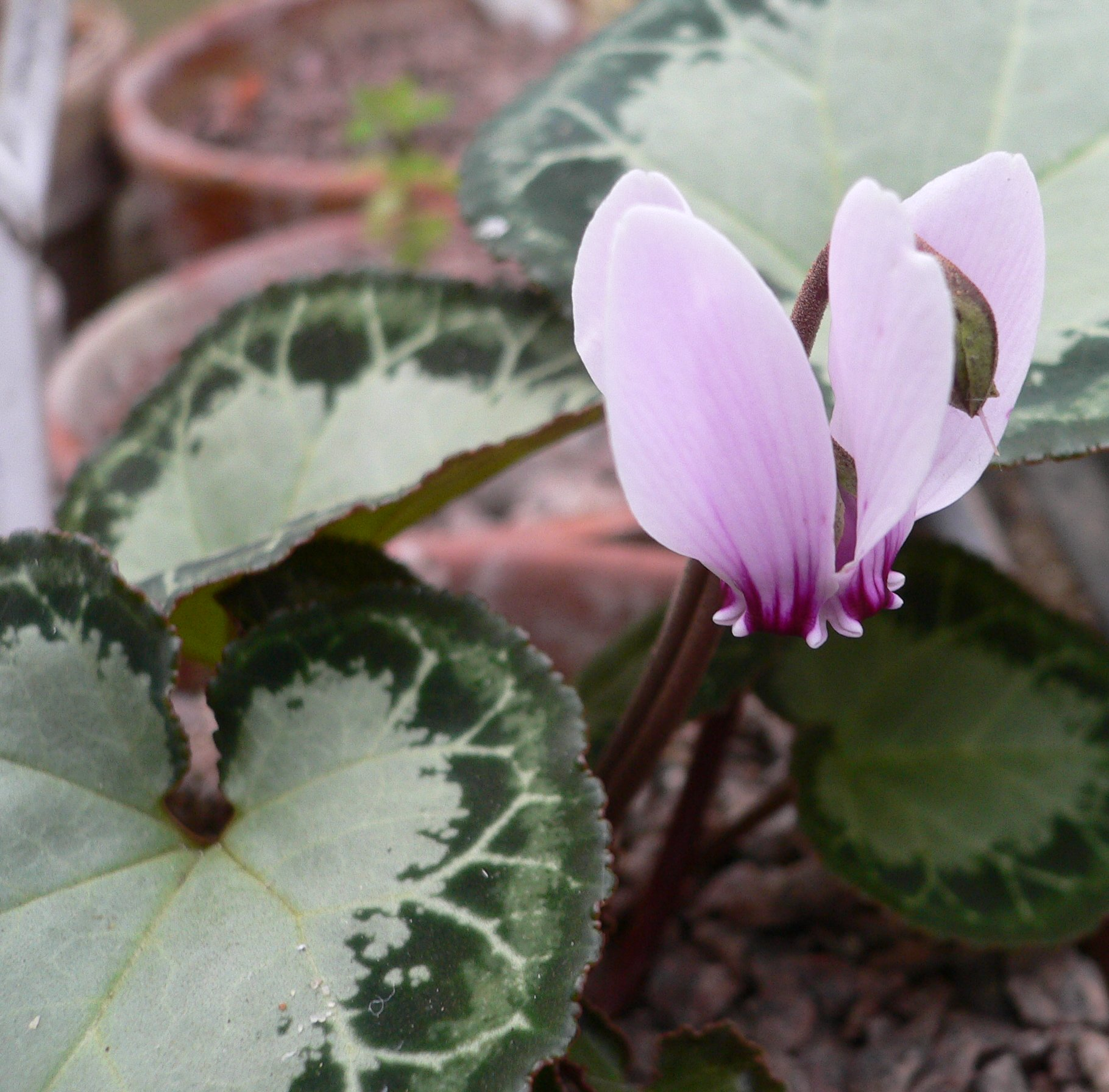

Scientific classification
- Kingdom: Plantae
- Clade: Embryophytes
- Clade: Tracheophytes
- Clade: Angiosperms
- Clade: Eudicots
- Clade: Asterids
- Order: Ericales
- Family: Primulaceae
- Genus: Cyclamen
- Subgenus: C. subg. Eucosme
- Species: C. graecum

Binomial name
- Cyclamen graecum Link (1834)

Subspecies
- Cyclamen graecum subsp. candicum Ietsw.; Cyclamen graecum subsp. graecum

Synonyms
- Cyclaminus graeca (Link) Asch. (1892)

= Cyclamen graecum =

Species of flowering plant in the primrose family

Cyclamen graecum, the Greek cyclamen, is a perennial plant in the flowering plant family Primulaceae that grows from a tuber. It is native to southern Greece and Crete, and is prized for its variable leaf forms, which include some of the most striking of any cyclamen.

== Distribution ==
Cyclamen graecum is native to a wide variety of areas up to 1,200 m (3,900 ft) elevation in southern mainland Greece, the Peloponnese, Aegean Islands, and Crete. It is also found in Cyprus.

== Description ==
The tuber is corky, with a thick, strong, fleshy anchor, and roots sprouting from the center of the bottom.

The leaves are heart-shaped and toothed.

The flowers bloom in autumn, with five petals which are white or pink with a darker blotch at the nose. They are often fragrant. The bases of the petals are curled outwards into auricles. After pollination, the flower stem coils in both directions, starting from the center, not from the top as in Cyclamen hederifolium.

== Subspecies ==
Cyclamen graecum has two accepted subspecies, distinguished by flower characteristics:

- Cyclamen graecum subsp. candicum Ietsw. (synonym Cyclamen pseudograecum Hildebr.) – endemic to western and central Crete. White or pale pink flowers with more pronounced auricles.
- Cyclamen graecum subsp. graecum (synonyms C. aegineticum Hildebr., C. gaidurowryssii Glasau, C. graecum f. album R.Frank & E.Frank, C. graecum subsp. mindleri (Heldr.) A.Davis & Govaerts, C. macrophyllum Sieber, C. miliarakesii Heldr. ex Halácsy, C. mindleri (Heldr.) Dyer, C. pentelici Hildebr., C. persicum subsp. mindleri (Heldr.) Knuth, C. velutinum Jord., Cyclaminos miliarakesii Heldr. ex R.Knuth, and Cyclaminos mindleri Heldr.) – native to mainland Greece and northwestern Crete. Pink flowers with a darker blotch at the nose.
  - Cyclamen graecum subsp. graecum f. album — all-white flowers. Peloponnese and Rhodopou Peninsula of Crete.

The former subspecies Cyclamen graecum subsp. anatolicum Ietsw. is now elevated to a separate species, Cyclamen maritimum Hildebr., native to the eastern Aegean Islands (including Rhodes), southwestern and southern Turkey, and northern Cyprus. It is characterized by more slender flowers with a smaller blotch and slight auricles.

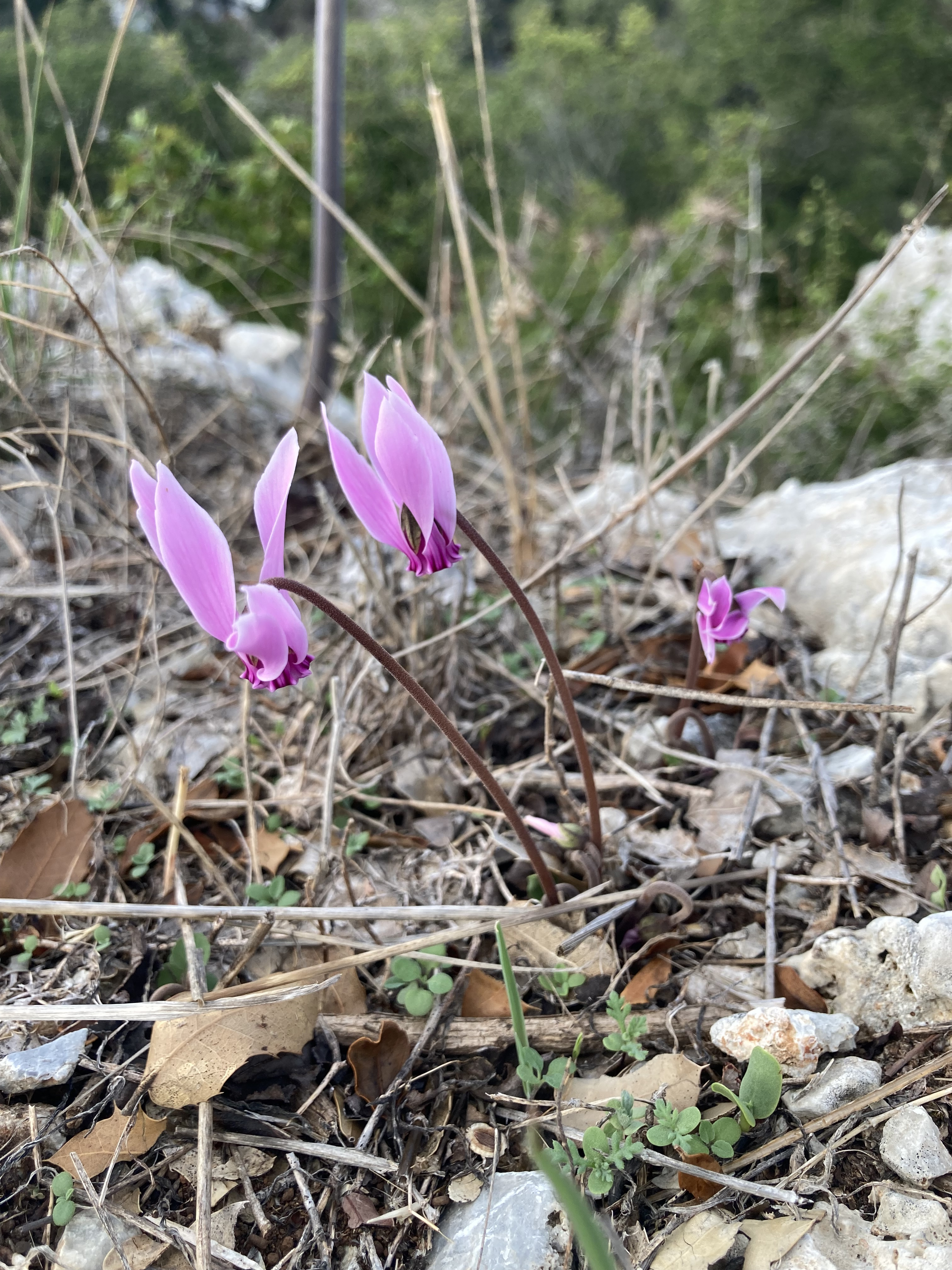
Greek Cyclamen
in Kythera

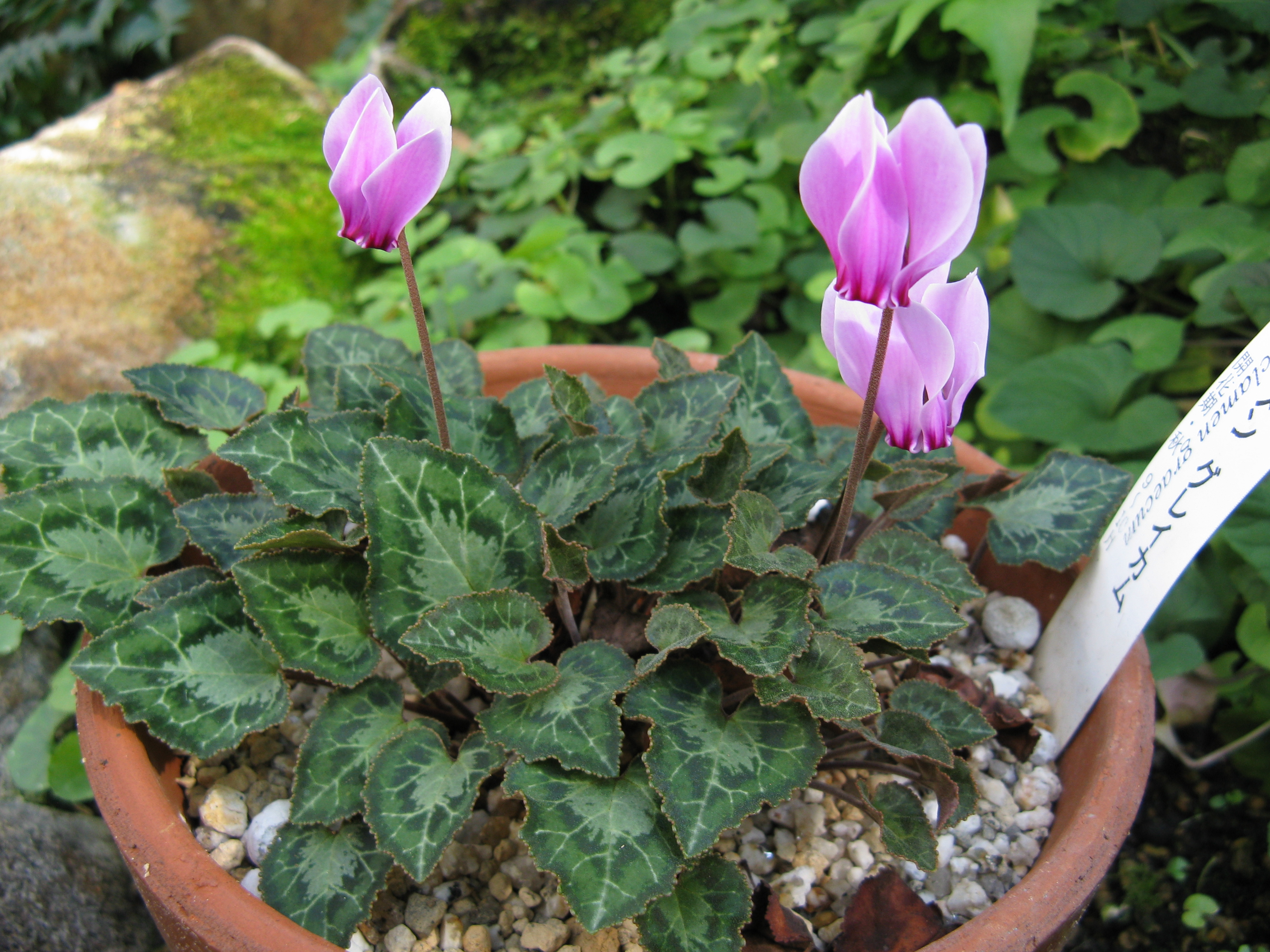
Cyclamen graecum, Osaka Prefectural Flower Garden
